= Operation Obviate =

Unsuccessful British air raid in World War II

- Part of World War II
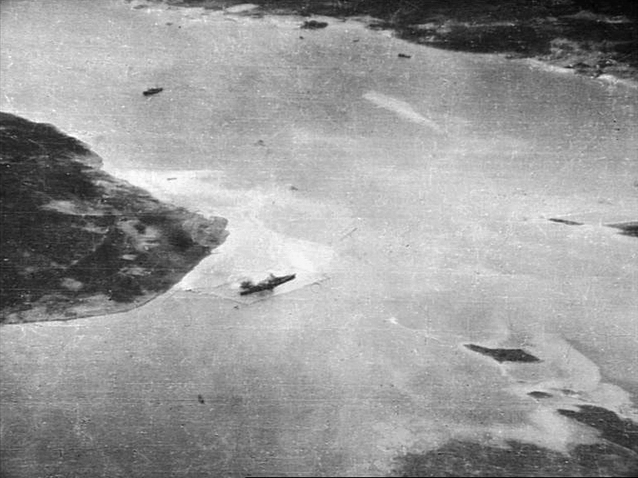
- Tirpitz at her mooring off the island of Håkøya in November 1944
| Date | 29 October 1944 |
| Location | Near Tromsø, Norway 69°38′50″N 18°48′30″E |
| Result | Inconclusive |

Belligerents
| United Kingdom | Germany |

Commanders and leaders
| (United Kingdom) C.C. McMullen (United Kingdom) James Bazin (United Kingdom) Willie Tait | (Nazi Germany) Wolf Junge |

Strength
| 39 Avro Lancasters | Battleship Tirpitz; 2 flak ships Anti-aircraft batteries |

Casualties and losses
| 1 aircraft | Minor damage to Tirpitz; 3 injured |

Operation Obviate was an unsuccessful British air raid of World War II which targeted the German battleship Tirpitz. It was conducted by Royal Air Force heavy bombers on 29 October 1944, and sought to destroy the damaged battleship after she moved to a new anchorage near Tromsø in northern Norway.

The attack followed up the successful Operation Paravane on 15 September 1944, when Tirpitz was crippled by British heavy bombers. As Allied intelligence was unaware that the battleship could no longer operate at sea and warships needed elsewhere were being retained in British waters to counter her, it was decided to make another attack. After a period of planning and preparations, 38 British bombers and a film aircraft departed from bases in northern Scotland during the early hours of 29 October. The attack took place that morning, but was frustrated by clouds over the Tromsø area which made it difficult for the Allied airmen to accurately target Tirpitz. The battleship was not directly hit, but was damaged by a bomb that exploded near her hull. A British bomber made a crash landing in Sweden after being hit by German anti-aircraft fire, and several others were damaged.

The Allies remained committed to sinking Tirpitz after the failure of Operation Obviate. The plans for the attack were reused for the next raid on the battleship, Operation Catechism, which took place on 12 November 1944. Weather conditions were favourable for the attackers, and Tirpitz was sunk with heavy loss of life.

== Background ==
From early 1942, the German battleship Tirpitz posed a significant threat to the Allied convoys transporting supplies through the Norwegian Sea to the Soviet Union. Stationed in fjords on the Norwegian coast, the ship was capable of overwhelming the close-escort forces assigned to the Arctic convoys. Tirpitz could also potentially attempt to enter the North Atlantic to attack Allied convoys travelling to the United Kingdom, as her sister ship Bismarck had sought to do in May 1941. To counter these threats, the Allies needed to keep a powerful force of warships with the British Home Fleet, and capital ships accompanied most convoys part of the way to the Soviet Union.

Tirpitz was repeatedly attacked by British forces. Royal Air Force (RAF) heavy bombers made four unsuccessful raids on the battleship between January and April 1942 while she was stationed at Fættenfjord. From March 1943, Tirpitz was based at Kaafjord in the far north of Norway. During Operation Source on 22 September 1943, she was severely damaged by explosives placed beneath her hull by Royal Navy personnel who had used midget submarines to penetrate Kaafjord. On 3 April 1944, aircraft flying from Royal Navy aircraft carriers attacked Tirpitz during Operation Tungsten and inflicted further damage. This attack had been timed for when it was believed repairs to rectify the damage caused by Operation Source were nearing completion. A series of subsequent aircraft carrier attacks, including Operation Mascot on 17 July and Operation Goodwood between 22 and 29 August, were unsuccessful.

As it was believed that further aircraft carrier raids would be fruitless due to shortcomings with the Royal Navy's aircraft and their armament, responsibility for sinking Tirpitz was transferred to the RAF's Bomber Command. On 15 September 1944, the elite Nos. 9 and 617 Squadrons attacked the battleship at Kaafjord during what was designated Operation Paravane. This operation employed Avro Lancaster heavy bombers armed with Tallboy bombs and "Johnnie Walker" mines, and was mounted from Yagodnik in the Soviet Union. Tirpitz was struck by a single Tallboy, which caused extensive damage to her bow and rendered her unfit for combat.

== Prelude ==
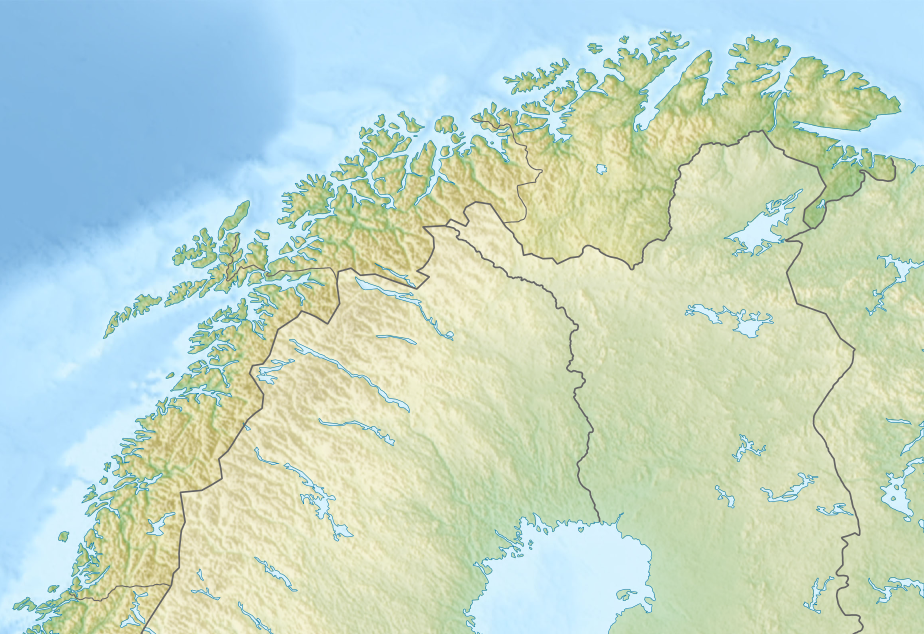
Northern Norway and nearby areas of Sweden, Finland and the Soviet Union

A meeting involving Grand Admiral Karl Dönitz, the commander of the German Navy, was held in Berlin on 23 September to discuss Tirpitz. Dönitz was informed that it would take nine months to repair the ship, and that all the work had to be done at Kaafjord as the battleship would be extremely vulnerable if she tried to sail to a major port. As Soviet forces were rapidly advancing towards northern Norway at that time, Dönitz judged that it was not feasible to either return the ship to ocean-going service or retain her at Kaafjord. Instead, he decided to use Tirpitz as a floating artillery battery to defend Tromsø against amphibious landings and bolster a defensive line which was being prepared in the Lyngenfjord area. Dönitz also expressed hope that retaining the ship in commission would "continue to tie down enemy forces and by her presence ... confound the enemies' intentions".

The commander of the German Navy's task force in northern Norway, Konteradmiral Rudolf Peters, was directed to position Tirpitz at a location near Tromsø where the water was shallow enough to prevent the battleship from sinking completely if she suffered further damage. An anchorage was selected just off the coast of the small island of Håkøya, 3.5 miles (5.6 km) west of Tromsø. This location lacked the natural defences Tirpitz had enjoyed at her previous Norwegian bases where she had sheltered in fjords which had steep mountains rising from the sea; this had made it difficult for attacking aircraft to spot and target the battleship. Instead, the terrain around Håkøya was fairly flat, and it was near the sea. To prepare Tirpitz for the 170-mile (270 km) voyage south-west, a repair ship was sent to Kaafjord and helped the battleship's crew to weld steel plates over the hole in her hull.

The Allies were able to confirm that Tirpitz had been badly damaged during Operation Paravane from intelligence gained by photo reconnaissance, signals intelligence and Norwegian agents, but were unsure if this had permanently put her out of service. The decision made by Dönitz on 23 September was also not known. As a result, the Royal Navy continued to assign capital ships to the Home Fleet to guard against the prospect of Tirpitz putting to sea, despite the need to redeploy these ships to the Pacific to reinforce attacks on Japanese forces.

Tirpitz's voyage to Tromsø took place during 15 and 16 October. The battleship departed Kaafjord at noon local time on 15 October under the escort of several warships. While Tirpitz was able to move under her own power, the flotilla included ocean-going tugboats tasked with towing the battleship if her damaged bow broke off. The German force slowly proceeded south, and Tirpitz eventually arrived at her berth off Håkøya at 3 pm on 16 October. Soon after reaching Håkøya 600 sailors, mostly members of her engine room crew, were removed from the ship. This left about 1,700 sailors on board.

The Allies rapidly responded to Tirpitz's redeployment. Norwegian Secret Intelligence Service (SIS) agents in the Kaafjord and Tromsø areas provided reports during the battleship's journey, with Egil Lindberg radioing the United Kingdom on 16 October to confirm the ship's arrival at Tromsø. In response to these reports, the British aircraft carrier HMS Implacable was dispatched from the Home Fleet's main base at Scapa Flow on 16 October tasked with confirming the location of Tirpitz. The RAF was also instructed to fly photo reconnaissance sorties over the Tromsø area. As a precaution in case Tirpitz was able to conduct combat operations, the battleship HMS King George V was diverted from an impending deployment to the Indian Ocean to reinforce the Home Fleet until its sole battleship, Duke of York, completed repairs.

British reconnaissance aircraft located Tirpitz during the afternoon of 18 October. The first aircraft to arrive over the area was a de Havilland Mosquito from No. 540 Squadron RAF operating out of RAF Dyce in Scotland. The Mosquito's crew took photographs of the battleship from a high altitude, and returned to base despite damage by anti-aircraft guns. Shortly afterwards Implacable's Fairey Firefly aircraft reconnoitred the Tromsø area, taking several low-altitude photographs of Tirpitz off Håkøya; these aircraft were also fired on by the German anti-aircraft guns but none were damaged. During the evening of 18 October, Implacable's commander sought permission to attack Tirpitz the next day, but this was refused by the commander of the Home Fleet, Admiral Bruce Fraser, on the grounds that the carrier had sailed without any of the Supermarine Seafire aircraft needed to suppress the anti-aircraft guns. Fraser was also aware from the attacks on Tirpitz at Kaafjord that the carrier's two squadrons of Fairey Barracuda dive bombers would probably not be able to inflict significant damage, and that further raids by RAF heavy bombers were required.

== Preparations ==
=== British ===
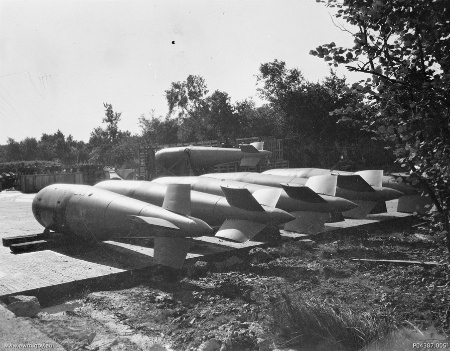
Six Tallboy bombs prior to being loaded on No. 9 Squadron aircraft in October or November 1944

The RAF began preparations to attack Tirpitz again immediately after she was confirmed to be at Tromsø. As the Tromsø area was within range of Lancasters flying from northern Scotland if they were fitted with extra fuel tanks and other modifications, this operation would be simpler to conduct than Operation Paravane. Nevertheless, it required a lengthy return flight of 2,252 miles (3,624 km).

Nos. 9 and 617 Squadrons' Lancasters were modified to extend their range. All of the aircraft selected for the operation were fitted with powerful Rolls-Royce Merlin 24 engines, which were hurriedly obtained from maintenance units and airfields across the UK. The Lancasters also carried two extra fuel tanks inside their fuselage: a tank usually fitted to Vickers Wellington bombers and a type of drop tank used by Mosquitos. The extra fuel put the aircraft greatly above their authorised maximum take-off weight. To address this, the bombers' forward and mid-upper gun turrets were removed, along with 3,000 rounds of ammunition from the rear turret, the flare chute, the armour plating around the pilot's seat and some of the oxygen and nitrogen bottles. The reduction in armament left the Lancasters very vulnerable to German fighter aircraft, and they would have to fly without escort as no British fighters had sufficient range to reach Tromsø.

The operational order for the attack on Tirpitz was issued by No. 5 Group on 24 October. It specified that the battleship was to be attacked by 36 Lancasters, Nos. 9 and 617 Squadrons each contributing 18. Another Lancaster from No. 463 Squadron RAAF's film unit would also take part but not carry any bombs. As the "Johnnie Walker" mines had failed during Operation Paravane, only Tallboy bombs were to be used, each bomber carrying one of the weapons. These 12,000-pound (5,400 kg) bombs were the largest in service with the RAF, and were capable of penetrating heavily armoured targets. The two squadrons were to remain at their home bases until it was judged that weather conditions over Tromsø were likely to be suitable. They would then be bombed up, and fly to RAF Kinloss, RAF Lossiemouth and RAF Milltown in northern Scotland. The operational order stated that the attack was required as "it appears likely that the Germans may attempt to get the battleship back to a base in Germany, where the necessary repairs and refit can be carried out".

After the decision was made to launch the attack, the bombers were to fly individually across the Norwegian Sea, and cross the Norwegian coast at a point between Mosjøen and Namos where No. 100 Group RAF had found a gap in German radar coverage. The Lancasters were to rendezvous over Torneträsk lake in northern Sweden; this flight path involved violating Sweden's neutrality, but was selected as it would allow the bombers to approach Tromsø from the south-east, which it was believed the Germans would not expect. After the rendezvous was completed and if weather conditions remained suitable, the bombers would proceed to Tromsø and attack Tirpitz if she could be visually spotted or, if obscured, her location confirmed relative to unobstructed landmarks. If these criteria were not met, the aircrew were not to bomb. Following the attack on Tirpitz, the bombers were to fly directly back to Scotland.

Group Captain Colin McMullen was selected to command the ground crew and aircrew ahead of the start of the attack, a role he had also played in Operation Paravane. The commanders of the two squadrons, Wing Commanders James Bazin (No. 9 Squadron) and "Willie" Tait (No. 617 Squadron), would control their units in the air. The attack was designated Operation Obviate.

Preparations were also made to recover aircraft or crews if any of the bombers ran short of fuel or suffered battle damage. RAF Sumburgh in Shetland was selected as the emergency airfield for the return journey from Tromsø. If any of the bombers experienced engine problems or lacked sufficient fuel to return to the UK, they were to proceed to the Soviet airfields at Vaenga or Yagodnik. The Soviet Government was not informed of this until 29 October, the day of the attack. No. 5 Group also requested that three Royal Navy destroyers be stationed along the return route from Tromsø to rescue the crews of any bombers forced down over the Norwegian Sea.

The British were able to draw on two intelligence sources other than photo reconnaissance flights to monitor the German forces at Tromsø. Lindberg was based there, and provided updates on Tirpitz by radio. As Lindberg worked in the local meteorological office, he also regularly reported on weather conditions. The other source of intelligence was German radio traffic decrypted by Allied codebreakers.

=== German ===
Tirpitz was particularly vulnerable to attack in the period immediately after she arrived at Håkøya. None of the many smoke generators and anti-aircraft guns, which had protected her against air attack at Kaafjord, were initially available because they had not yet been shipped south. The only protection available was from the battleship's own armament, two flak ships anchored nearby, and several anti-aircraft batteries in the Tromsø area. British intelligence believed that there were 16 heavy and 16 light anti-aircraft guns in the area at the time of Operation Obviate. The battleship was also surrounded by torpedo nets. No fighter aircraft were stationed nearby. The depth of water below Tirpitz at her mooring was greater than anticipated, leaving the ship vulnerable to capsizing. Owing to the space needed by the torpedo nets, it was not possible to move Tirpitz closer to shore. Instead, work began on building up the seabed using earth and gravel two weeks after she reached Håkøya.

The battleship's crew expected further air attacks, and doubted that she would survive them. This, and a belief that Germany would lose the war, led to poor morale. The civilian population of Tromsø also expected air attacks after Tirpitz arrived, and were concerned about the prospect of being accidentally bombed.

== Attack ==
=== Departure ===
On 26 October, Bomber Command advised the Admiralty that Operation Obviate would commence as soon as weather conditions permitted after the night of 27 October. No. 5 Group also informed the two squadrons that day to make final preparations for the mission. This included loading the Tallboy bombs. In the evening of 27 October, the aircrew selected for Operation Obviate were briefed on the plan and told they would proceed to the Scottish airfields the next morning.

During the morning of 28 October, 20 Lancasters from each of the squadrons flew from their home bases to Kinloss, Lossiemouth and Milltown. A photo reconnaissance Mosquito flew over Tromsø that morning, and confirmed that Tirpitz was still moored off Håkøya and that weather conditions remained favourable for an attack. As forecasts for the next day indicated that good weather would continue, the attack was set for 29 October. Another Mosquito flew over the Tromsø area at midnight on 28 October, and reported that conditions remained clear.

The strike force departed Scotland in the early hours of 29 October. No. 9 Squadron dispatched 20 Lancasters, the aircraft taking off between 1:18 and 2:55 am BST. No. 617 Squadron contributed 19 aircraft, which departed between 1:03 and 2:10 am BST. The No. 463 Squadron Lancaster accompanied the attack aircraft.

=== Over Tromsø ===
The approach flight was uneventful. The aircraft flew individually across the Norwegian Sea at an altitude of 1,500 feet (460 m), and began climbing to 10,000 feet (3,000 m) after they crossed the Norwegian coast. One of the No. 9 Squadron aircraft experienced engine problems during the climb, and returned to the UK. The bombers met over Torneträsk lake, formed up into their attack formations and proceeded to Tromsø. During this flight the Lancasters climbed to their bombing altitudes of between 13,000 and 16,000 feet (4,000 and 4,900 m). The attack force was fired on by Swedish anti-aircraft guns when it passed near Abisko, but no hits were recorded.

The attack on Tirpitz was frustrated by cloud cover. While the weather remained fine during the approach to Tromsø, the surrounding area was mainly covered by cloud. Tirpitz was visible when the bombers first arrived over the Tromsø area, but was obscured before any of them were in position to release their bombs. Despite the orders to bring their Tallboys back if visual bombing was not possible, almost all the bombers attacked; historian Patrick Bishop has written that this was due to an unwillingness to make the long return flight carrying a 12,000-pound (5,400 kg) bomb.

The first bombs were dropped at 7:49 am GMT, No. 617 Squadron leading the attack. Sixteen aircraft from the squadron released Tallboys aimed at Tirpitz's estimated position, several making multiple bomb runs before attacking. One of the three Lancasters which did not bomb made four runs over Tromsø before Tait gave its pilot permission to break off the attack. No. 9 Squadron began its attack six minutes after its sister squadron, 17 Lancasters dropping Tallboys. Like No. 617 Squadron, several aircraft from No. 9 Squadron made multiple bomb runs over Tromsø, one conducting five approaches before attacking. At least two of the No. 9 Squadron crews were able to take visual aim at Tirpitz through gaps in the cloud; the others aimed at the battleship's estimated position. Of the two No. 9 Squadron aircraft which did not bomb, one made two passes over Tromsø. The final bomb was dropped at 8:07 am GMT.

The German defenders began firing on the British aircraft as they approached Tirpitz. Four No. 9 Squadron Lancasters, at least one from No. 617 Squadron, and the No. 463 Squadron film aircraft, were damaged by anti-aircraft fire. The No. 617 Squadron Lancaster lost so much fuel from two hits that its pilot judged that the aircraft would not be able to reach RAF Sumburgh or the USSR. Instead, he decided to put down in northern Sweden so that the crew could avoid being made prisoners of war. The aircraft made a crash landing in a bog near Porjus. All of the crew survived, and were eventually repatriated to the UK by the Swedish Government. The damage inflicted on the other Lancasters was not significant.

None of the Tallboys struck Tirpitz. Several landed in the water near her. The explosion of one of these bombs damaged the battleship's port-side propeller shaft and rudder, and caused flooding. Three of her crew were injured. The explosions from the huge bombs were felt by civilians in Tromsø.

== Aftermath ==
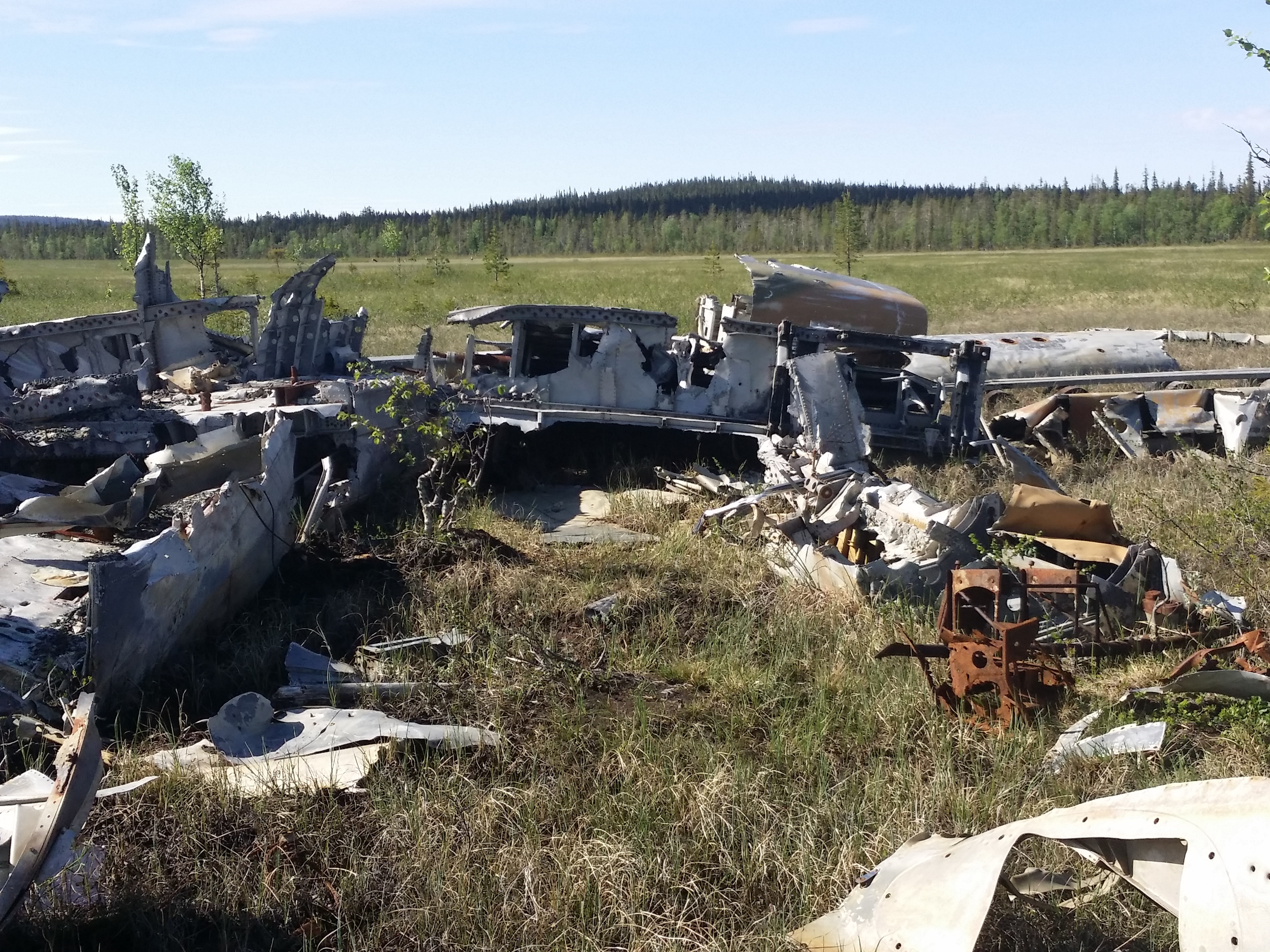
Part of the wreckage of the No. 617 Squadron Lancaster which made a crash landing in Sweden, photographed in 2015

Most of the Lancasters' return flights were uneventful, all returning to the UK after completing flights of an average duration of 13 hours. A No. 617 Squadron aircraft made an emergency landing at RAF Sumburgh after running short of fuel; this was one of the Lancasters that had not released its Tallboy. The damaged No. 463 Squadron aircraft successfully landed on one wheel at RAF Waddington. The airmen were aware that Tirpitz had not been sunk, and were disappointed with the operation's results. No. 5 Group's commander, Air Commodore Ralph Cochrane, sent them a message stating "Congratulations on your splendid flight and perseverance. Luck won't always favour the Tirpitz. One day you'll get her."

Allied intelligence soon learned that Tirpitz had been only slightly damaged. A Mosquito conducted a photo reconnaissance flight over the Tromsø area at 12:10 pm GMT on 29 October. Its photos showed no visible damage to the battleship. German post-battle reports broadcast by radio which were intercepted and decoded confirmed that damage was limited to the propeller shaft and rudder. Lindberg recommended that the RAF "give her another salvo" in one of his reports.

The Germans believed that several Lancasters had been shot down in the attack. Tirpitz's crew attributed the failure of Operation Obviate to their ship's gunnery, leading to improved morale. They expected that further attacks would be made, and were frustrated that Luftwaffe fighters had not been available to protect the battleship. A force of 38 fighters was transferred to Bardufoss after Operation Obviate to bolster the region's air defences.

The British remained determined to sink Tirpitz as soon as possible. Shortly after the 29 October raid, it was decided to use the same plans as had been employed in Operation Obviate in the next attack, which was designated Operation Catechism. On 12 November, Nos. 9 and 617 Squadrons set out from northern Scotland again. The weather over the Tromsø area was clear when they arrived, and Tirpitz was hit by two Tallboy bombs. The damage from these bombs and several near misses caused the battleship to capsize. Between 940 and 1,204 of her crew were killed.

The Lancaster which crash-landed near Porjus, "Easy Elsie", remains in-situ. The aircraft's engines and tyres were removed and sold locally soon after it crashed. The airframe was dismantled by a scrapper in the 1960s or 1970s, but abandoned as it proved too difficult to move from the site. The tail section of the aircraft was recovered in 1984 by the Swedish Air Force on behalf of the Swedish Air Force Museum, and the crash site was opened up to visitors in the early 1990s. Proposals to return the rest of the wreckage to the UK have not been successful.

== Bibliography ==
- Bennett, G. H., ed. (2012). "Introduction". Hunting Tirpitz: Naval Operations Against Bismarck's Sister Ship. Plymouth: University of Plymouth Press. pp. 7–25. ISBN 978-1-84102-310-6.
- Bishop, Patrick (2012). Target Tirpitz. London: Harper Press. ISBN 978-0-00-743119-9.
- Ellis, John (1999). One Day in a Very Long War: Wednesday 25th October 1944 (Pimlico ed.). London: Pimlico. ISBN 978-0-7126-7465-2.
- Faulkner, Marcus; Wilkinson, Peter (2012). War at Sea: A Naval Atlas, 1939–1945. Annapolis, Maryland: Naval Institute Press. ISBN 978-1-59114-560-8.
- Forsgren, Jan (2014). Sinking the Beast: The RAF 1944 Lancaster Raids Against Tirpitz. Stroud, United Kingdom: Fonthill Media. ISBN 978-1-78155-318-3.
- Hinsley, F.H.; et al. (1984). British Intelligence in the Second World War: Its Influence on Strategy and Operations. History of the Second World War. Vol. Three, Part I. London: Her Majesty's Stationery Office. ISBN 978-0-11-630935-8.
- Konstam, Angus (2018). Sink the Tirpitz 1942–44: The RAF and Fleet Air Arm Duel with Germany's Mighty Battleship. Air campaign, 7. Oxford: Osprey Publishing. ISBN 978-1-4728-3159-0.
- Roskill, S.W. (1961). The War at Sea 1939–1945. History of the Second World War. Vol. III: The Offensive Part II 1st June 1944-14th August 1945. London: Her Majesty's Stationery Office. OCLC 59005418.
- Sweetman, John (2000). Tirpitz: Hunting the Beast: Air Attacks on the German Battleship, 1940–44. Annapolis, Maryland: Naval Institute Press. ISBN 978-1-55750-822-5.
- Zetterling, Niklas; Tamelander, Michael (2009). Tirpitz: The Life and Death of Germany's Last Super Battleship. Philadelphia: Casemate. ISBN 978-1-935149-18-7.
