= James Brian Tait =

Royal Air Force officer (1916–2007)

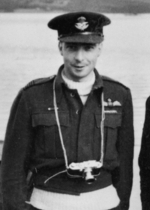
- Tait on the wreck of the German battleship Tirpitz, 1945
- Born: 9 December 1916; Manchester, England
- Died: 31 August 2007 (aged 90)
- Military career
- Allegiance: United Kingdom
- Branch: Royal Air Force
- Service years: 1936–1964
- Rank: Group Captain
- Nickname: "Tirpitz"
- Commands: RAF Coningsby (c. 1953–55); No. 617 Squadron; No. 78 Squadron (1942, 1944); No. 35 Squadron (1941); No. 51 Squadron (1941)
- Conflicts: Second World War: Operation Colossus; Operation Paravane; Operation Obviate; Operation Catechism
- Awards: Companion of the Distinguished Service Order & Three Bars; Distinguished Flying Cross & Bar; Mentioned in Despatches (2)
- Other work: Computer programmer with ICL

Group Captain James Brian "Willie" Tait, DSO & Three Bars, DFC & Bar (9 December 1916 – 31 August 2007) was an officer in the Royal Air Force during and after the Second World War. He conducted 101 bombing missions during the war, including the one that finally sank the German battleship Tirpitz in 1944. He succeeded Leonard Cheshire as commander of the famous 617 Squadron and with six gallantry decorations to his name, remains one of the most distinguished airmen in the history of the nations of the British Commonwealth.

== Early career ==
Tait was born in Manchester (Note: Brickhill described Tait as "a Welshman... [with] his own brand of introspection and dry wit") and educated at Wellingborough School. After visiting a Schneider Trophy event in 1928, he decided to join the RAF. He graduated from the RAF College Cranwell and was commissioned as a pilot officer in the RAF on 1 August 1936 and joined No. 51 Squadron RAF, flying Armstrong Whitworth Whitley bombers. He was promoted to flying officer on 1 February 1938.

== Second World War ==
Tait was active on bombing operations with 51 Squadron in 1940, including several long-distance raids on Berlin and the first British air raid on Italy, crossing the Alps to bomb Turin, and was awarded the Distinguished Flying Cross (DFC). He was promoted to flight lieutenant on 1 February 1940. By the end of the year, he was commanding 51 Squadron. On 10 February 1941, he led the aircraft involved in Operation Colossus flying from Malta to drop paratroops in southern Italy. For this mission, he was awarded the DSO. He was given a temporary promotion to squadron leader on 1 March 1941, which was later made substantive with the same seniority.

After Colossus, Tait joined 35 Squadron, the first squadron to be equipped with Handley Page Halifaxes heavy bombers. He was awarded the first bar to his DSO for his exploits in leading a daylight raid on Kiel on 30 June 1941. He was mentioned in despatches in September 1941. Tait was rested from operations and posted to a training unit, but as the training units were drawn upon to make up numbers he flew on the three "Thousand Bomber Raids" in early 1942.

In mid-1942, Tait was appointed to command No. 78 Squadron RAF and was mentioned in despatches during his period in command. He was made a temporary wing commander on 1 June 1942. In March 1944, he became base operations commander at RAF Waddington where he continued to fly missions with RAAF Avro Lancaster crews despite holding a non-flying job. He was given a substantive promotion to wing commander on 1 March 1944.

He returned to operational duties in May 1944, becoming Master Bomber of 5 Group. His service in this role resulted in his being awarded a second bar to his DSO.

He succeeded Leonard Cheshire as commander of No. 617 Squadron RAF in July 1944 when Cheshire was taken off flying duties after over 100 missions. 617 Squadron, the famous "Dambusters" squadron, specialised in low-level target marking and precision attacks, and Tait continued Cheshire's practice of marking targets from low level and directing the raid from a Mustang fighter. Under his command, the squadron bombed a series of V-1 flying bomb storage sites and V-2 rocket launching sites with "Tallboy" 12,000 lb "earthquake" bombs. Tait was awarded a bar to his DFC for pressing home a low-level attack in a daylight raid on the Kembs Barrage in Alsace against fierce defensive fire despite having a damaged aircraft.

Tirpitz in Norway, 1944

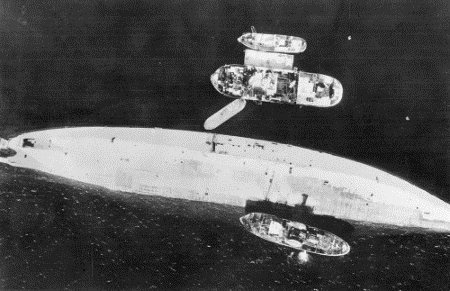
Tirpitz capsized in 1944.

On 15 September 1944, Tait led a force of 37 Avro Lancaster bombers of 617 Squadron and 9 Squadron on Operation Paravane. Flying from an airfield at Yagodnik, near Arkhangelsk on the Kola Peninsula in northern Russia, they attacked the German battleship Tirpitz, in the Kaa Fjord. Despite smoke obscuring the target, the Tirpitz was so severely damaged the German High Command (OKW) decided the ship could not be restored to seaworthiness. Tirpitz was therefore moved to Tromsø so its armament could be used as defensive artillery against an anticipated Allied invasion. The Germans were able to keep the ship's lack of seaworthiness a secret and so its destruction remained a high priority. Tait led his force in a second attack on 28 October named Operation Obviate, this time from RAF Lossiemouth in Scotland (the ship's move having brought her within range). This raid was unsuccessful because of the heavy cloud obscuring the target shortly before the bombers arrived. On 12 November, Tait led his force against the Tirpitz for a third and final raid, Operation Catechism. The Luftwaffe failed to intercept the British bombers, and three direct hits by Tallboy bombs left the ship capsized west of Tromsø, in the bay of Håkøybotn.

In mid-December 1944, Tait, having completed 101 missions, was grounded and assigned to train Canadian bomber crews. Like his predecessor at No. 617 Squadron, he was recommended for the Victoria Cross for his "sustained gallantry" over almost five years of operations. However, unlike Cheshire, he was awarded the third bar to his DSO. The citation for this award, published in the London Gazette January 1945, reads:

This officer has displayed conspicuous bravery and extreme devotion to duty in the face of the enemy constantly exemplified over a long period of operational flying. He has completed a very large number of sorties, many of them against most dangerous and difficult targets, and the successes obtained are a magnificent tribute to his brilliant leadership and unsurpassed skill. On 3 occasions Wing Commander Tait has led attacks on the German battleship "Tirpitz". The last occasion was on the 12th of November 1944. The vessel was lying at Tromso. Visibility was good as Wing Commander Tait led his squadron into the attack. In spite of continuous fire from 3 ships and from land batteries, the attack was pressed home. The first bomb, dropped by Wing Commander Tait, hit the Tirpitz. Another hit was obtained almost immediately and another 12,000 lb. bomb fell close alongside. The battleship caught fire and smoke poured from her. Finally, she capsized. By his outstanding skill and leadership, Wing Commander Tait played a prominent part in the success of this operation. This officer has completed 98 sorties and throughout has set an example of a high order.

— London Gazette

== Post-war career ==
Tait remained in the RAF after the war, initially reverting to the rank of squadron leader. He was re-promoted to wing commander in 1947 (back-dated to October 1946). He served in South East Asia, India, the Middle East, and Singapore. He commanded RAF Coningsby, was promoted to group captain in 1953, appointed Aide-de-camp to the Queen in 1959, and retired from the RAF in 1964.

He retrained as a computer programmer, and joined ICL as a technical representative, working in Eastern Europe. After a period with a haulage company, he became an investment adviser with Scottish Widows. He finally retired in 1981.

He married Betty Plummer in 1945. They had met during the war when she was an officer in the Women's Auxiliary Air Force. She died in 1990. Tait died on 31 August 2007; he was survived by his son and two daughters.

== Footnotes ==
Military offices
Preceded by Leonard Cheshire	Officer Commanding No. 617 Squadron; July – December 1944	Succeeded by John Emilius Fauquier
