= Paravane =

Paravane may refer to:

- Paravane (water kite), a towed winged underwater object

== See also ==
- Operation Paravane, a World War II operation
