= Knut Moe =

Norwegian resistance radio agent

- Born: 1921; Hammerfest, Norway
- Died: 1989 (age 67/68)

Knut Moe (1921–1989) was a Norwegian resistance member and a radio agent for the Special Intelligence Service, during World War II.

== World War II ==
He was born in Hammerfest. When World War II reached Norway in 1940 with the invasion and occupation of Norway by Nazi Germany, Moe joined the Norwegian resistance movement. He eventually fled to England, where he was recruited by the Special Intelligence Service and trained as a telegrapher. He soon returned to Norway to conduct intelligence work, being parachuted over Finnmarksvidda.

He operated an illegal radio post in Alta together with Torstein Raaby, Alfred Henningsen and Karl Rasmussen. The codename was "Ida", and it became a part of the network "Venus" of Northern Norway. They mainly reported on German troop and naval movements. Among their achievements was the 25 December 1943 report that the German battleship Scharnhorst was heading into open waters. The ship was subsequently sunk in the Battle of North Cape. Rasmussen was later captured by Gestapo, whereas Moe and Raaby fled in May 1944 to England via Sweden and Finland. Imprisoned and tortured, Rasmussen committed suicide by auto-defenestration in June 1944.

Another major concern was the presence of the German battleship Tirpitz. In September 1943 Torbjørn Johansen bicycled from Tromsø to Alta and back with reports on the ship. The information was conveyed by his brother, radio operator Einar Johansen, leading to an attack in September 1943. Tirpitz was damaged, but not destroyed. In April 1944, before fleeing for the first time, Raaby reported on its status, leading to an attack where Tirpitz was again damaged. In September 1944, Moe and another agent were parachuted over Finnmarksvidda for the second time. They stayed in the mountains west of Alta while taking several tours of reconnaissance. Following an assault on 15 September 1944, Tirpitz was moved further south, near Tromsø to function as a floating gun battery. Moe reported on Tirpitz in November 1944, and the ship was finally destroyed. He fled Norway for the third time, again via Finland and Sweden in a harsh climate.

== Post-war life ==
After the war Moe participated in the Independent Norwegian Brigade Group in Germany. He took a hotelier's education in Switzerland and worked as a steward before being hired in the interest group Sjømilitære Samfund in 1958. He died in 1989.
