= Håkøya =

Island in Tromsø, Norway

Håkøya (Norwegian); Ávká (Northern Sami)
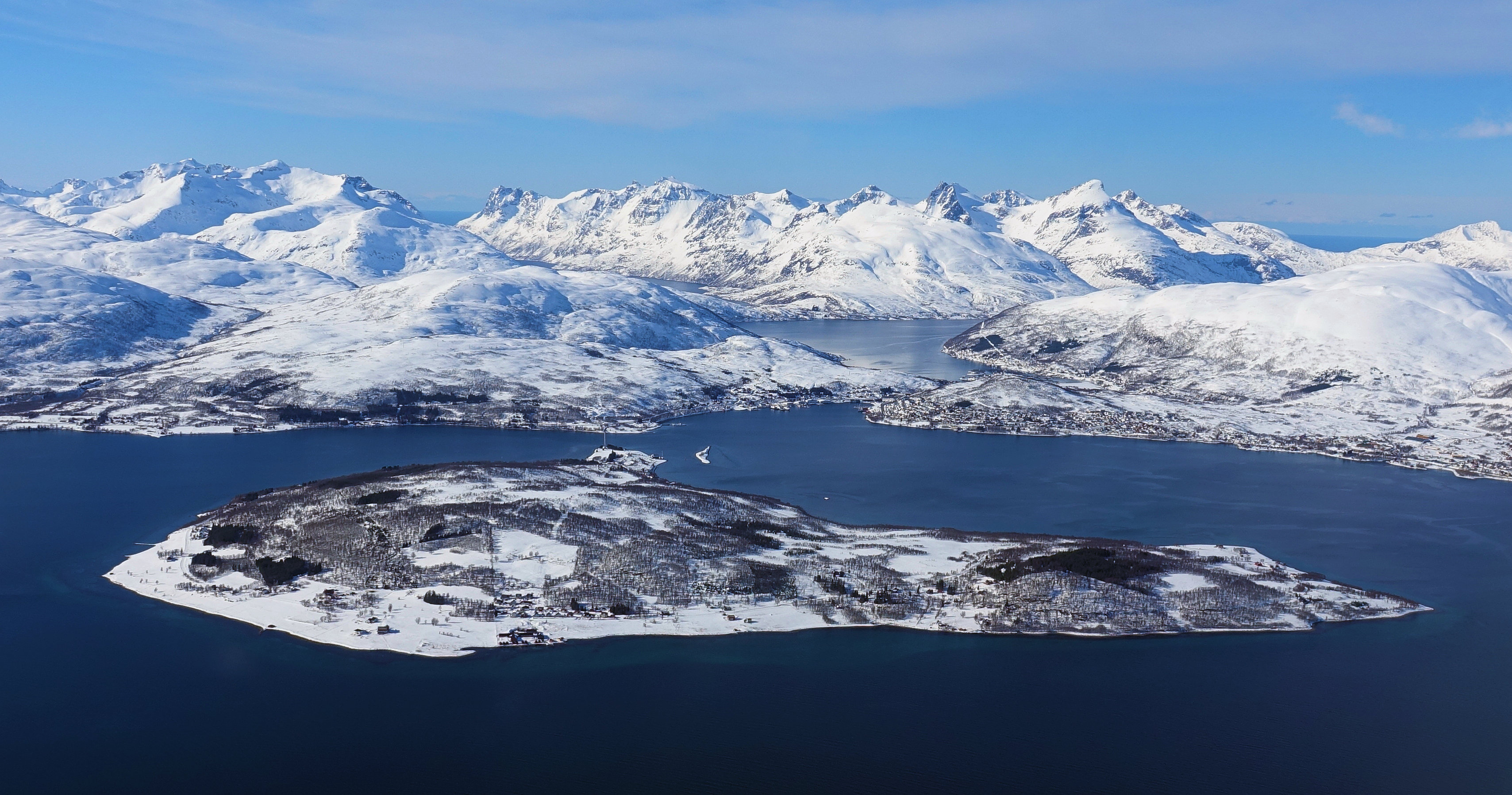
- View of Håkøya
- Interactive map of: Håkøya (Norwegian); Ávká (Northern Sami)

Geography
- Location: Troms, Norway
- Coordinates: 69.6544°N 18.7930°E
- Area: 3.69 km^{2} (1.42 sq mi)
- Length: 3 km (1.9 mi)
- Width: 2.3 km (1.43 mi)
- Highest elevation: 105 m (344 ft)
- Highest point: Skjellstonghaugen

Administration
- Norway
- County: Troms
- Municipality: Tromsø Municipality

Håkøya (Norwegian) or Ávká (Northern Sami) is an island in Tromsø Municipality in Troms county, Norway. The 3.69-square-kilometre (1.42 sq mi) island is located in the Sandnessundet strait between the islands Kvaløya and Tromsøya. It is southeast of the village of Eidkjosen on Kvaløya and west of the city of Tromsø on Tromsøya.

The higher elevations on the island are wooded, while residential houses, cabins, and farms are mostly located on the coastal areas. The island is connected with Kvaløya by the 330-metre (1,080 ft) long Håkøybrua. The original bridge was wooden, but the upper part was replaced with steel and concrete in 2004.

== History ==
The German battleship Tirpitz was located at Håkøya starting on 15 October 1944 until 12 November 1944, when it was sunk by British bombers during Operation Catechism.

== Media gallery ==
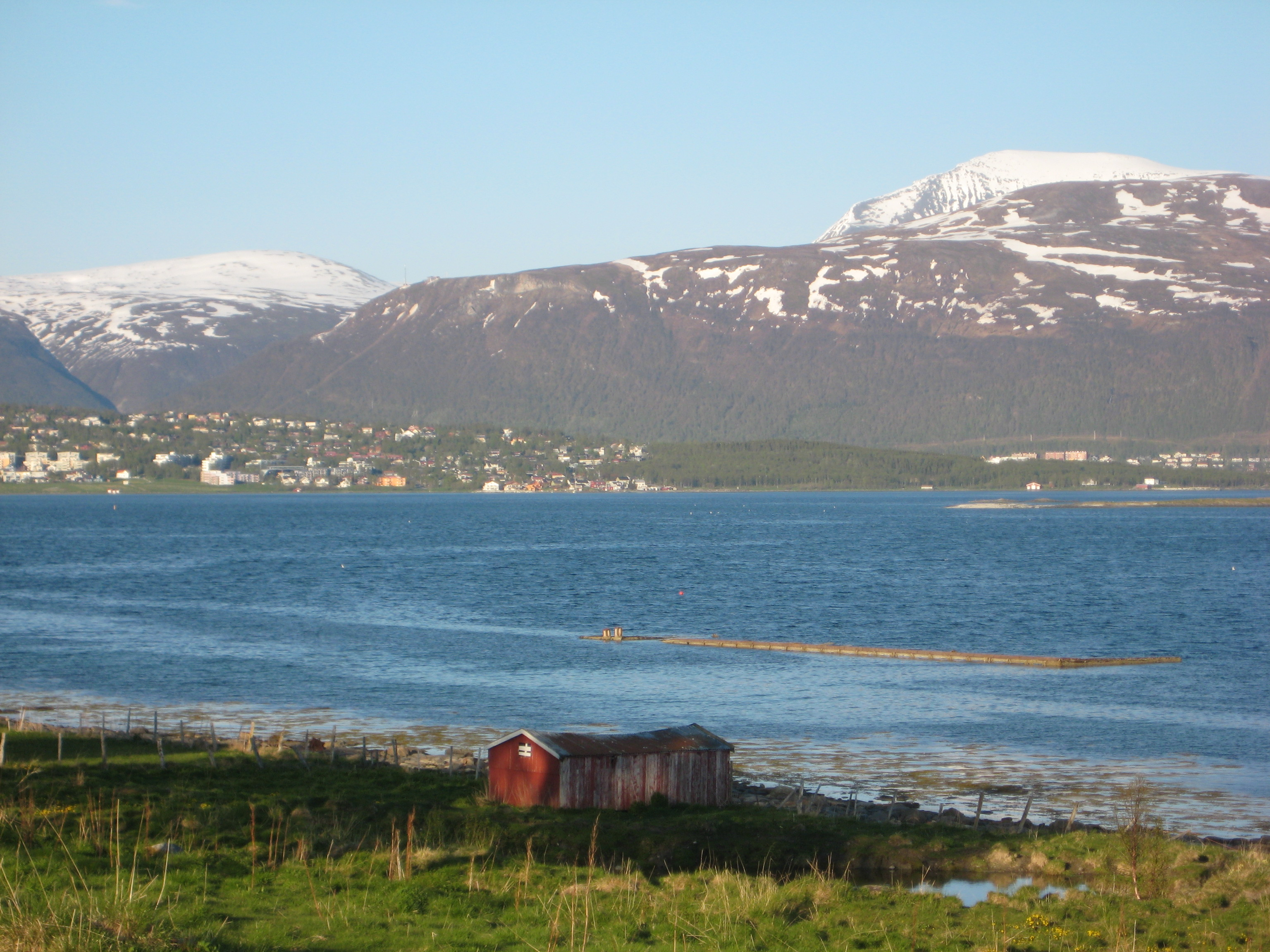
Håkøya, looking towards the city of Tromsø

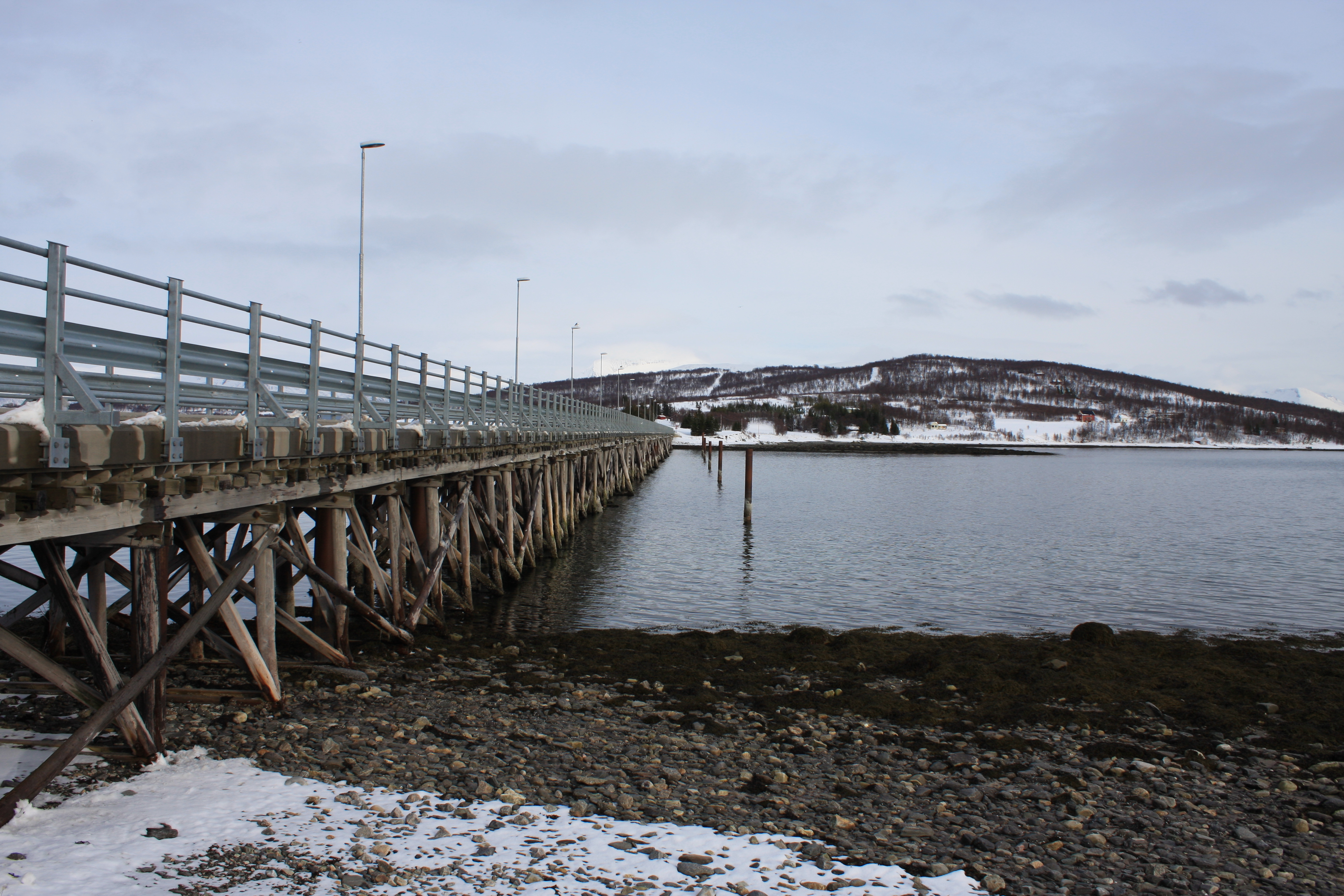
Håkøy Bridge

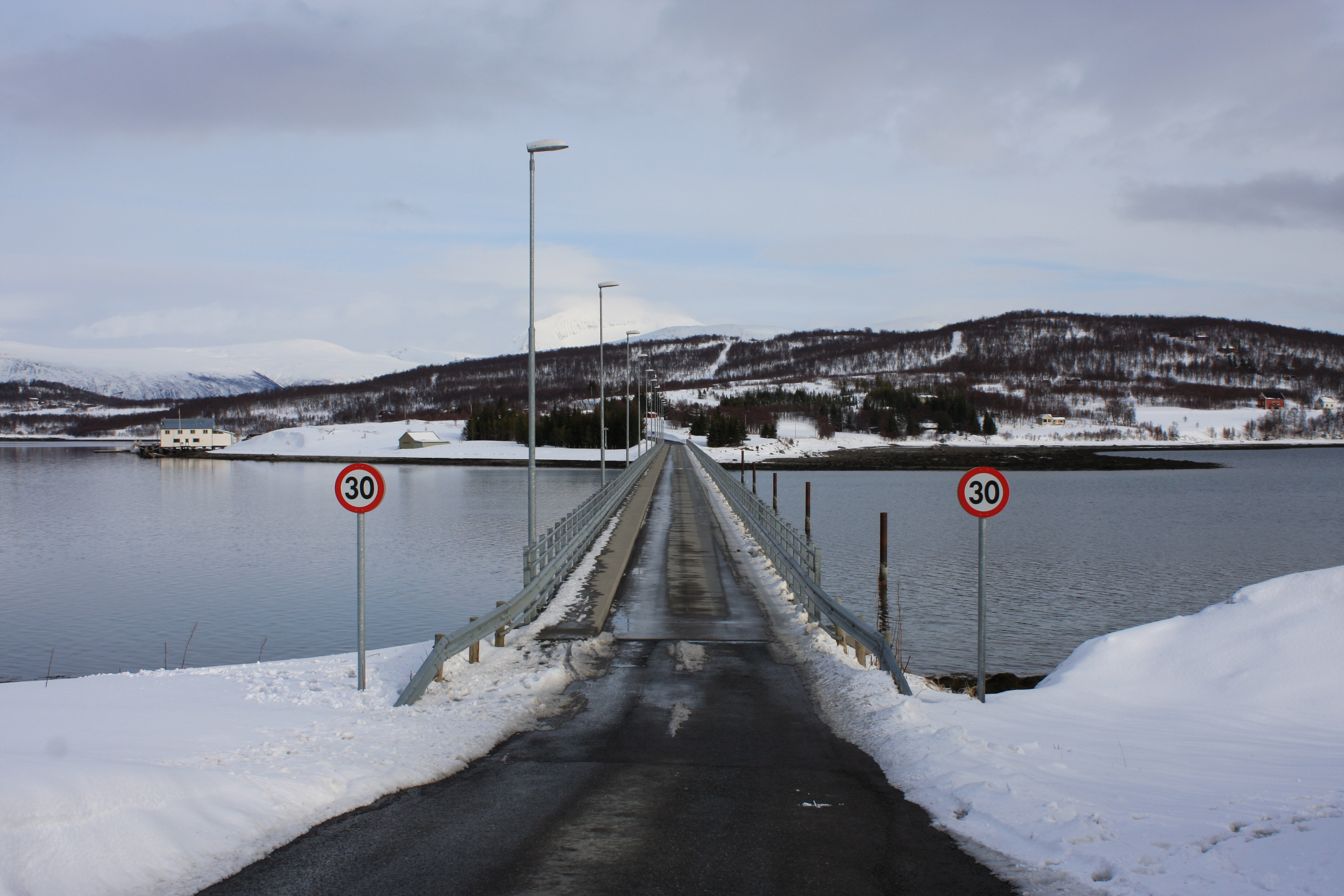
Håkøy Bridge

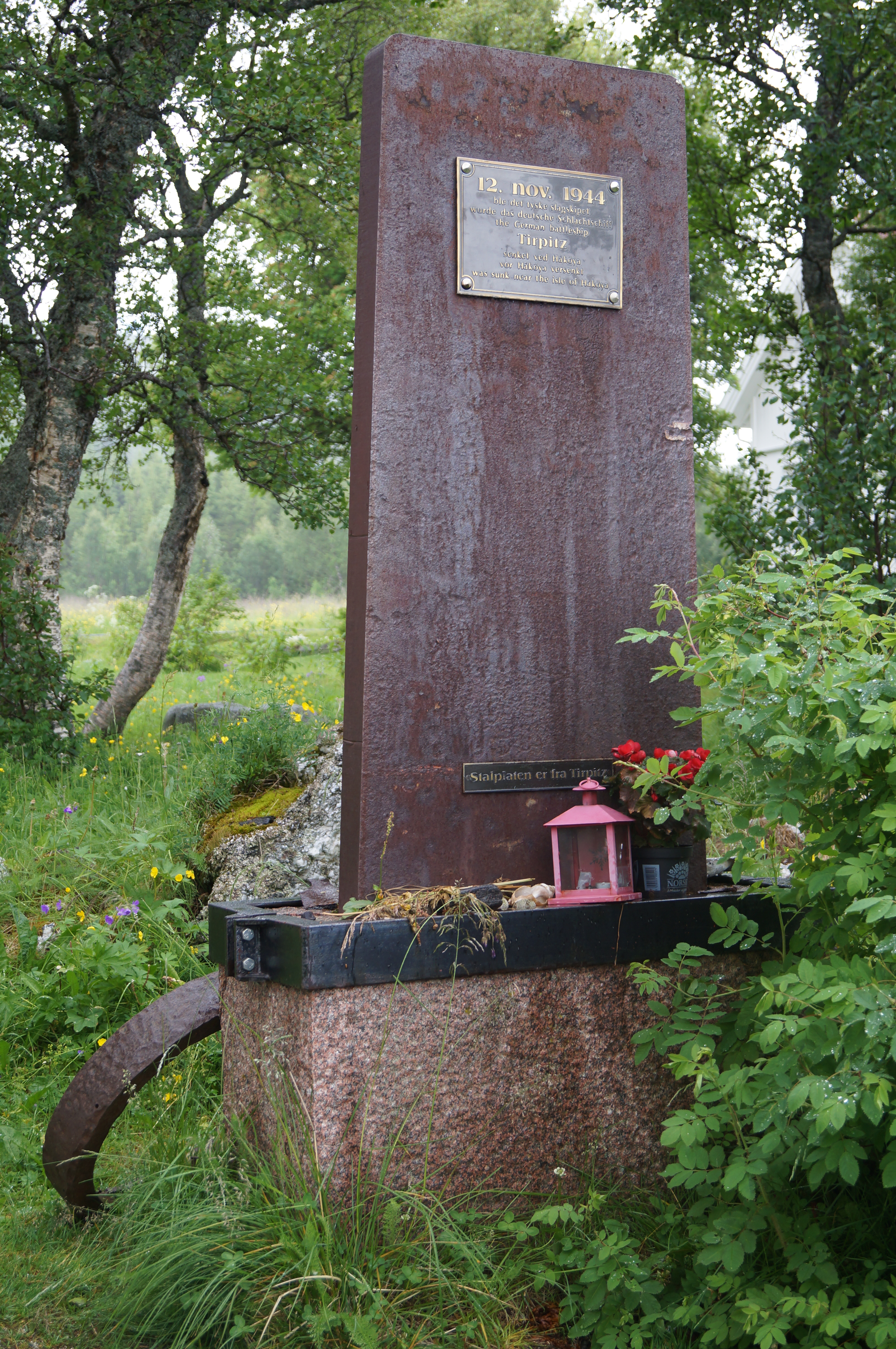
Tirpitz memorial

== See also ==
- List of islands of Norway
