= Wolf Junge =

German naval officer

- Born: January 3, 1903; Schwarzenberg, Prussia, German Empire
- Died: 21 February 1964 (aged 61)
- Allegiance: Weimar Republic; Nazi Germany
- Branch: Reichsmarine; Kriegsmarine
- Service years: 1922 – 1945
- Rank: Captain at sea
- Conflicts: World War II: Operation Tungsten

Wolf Junge (5 January 1903 – 21 February 1964) was a German naval officer of World War II. As a Kapitän zur See, he was appointed the executive officer of the battleship Tirpitz in August 1943 under Kapitän zur See Hans Meyer. He temporarily took control of the ship on 3 April 1944 when Meyer was badly wounded during the Operation Tungsten air attack on the Tirpitz. Junge was subsequently confirmed in this role during May. However, he was unpopular with the battleship's crew as he was perceived to have had little experience operating warships at sea. Junge handed command of Tirpitz to Kapitän zur See Robert Weber in November 1944; Weber was formerly the first officer of the ship. Junge had been appointed as a staff officer at the OKM in that month.
