= Yagodnik =

Former airfield in Russia

Yagodnik Airfield
- Аэродром "Ягодник"
- Russia

Site information
- Condition: Demolished

Location
- Yagodnik in Russia
- Coordinates: 64.402778°N 40.888611°E

Site history
- Events: Operation Paravane

Yagodnik, Arkhangelsk Oblast, north west Russia, was the site of a World War II airfield. It is located near Arkhangelsk, on an island in the Northern Dvina river, 9 kilometres from the sea at Dvina Bay.

== Operation Paravane ==
The airfield was used by the Royal Air Force as a temporary base in September 1944 to launch Operation Paravane, a bombing raid against the German battleship Tirpitz in Kåfjord in northern Norway.

Thirty-eight Avro Lancasters of 617 and 9 Squadrons, two Liberator transports and a weather reconnaissance Mosquito set off for Yagodnik on the night of 10 September 1944. Once there, poor visibility prevented many aircraft from finding Yagodnik airfield. Now short of fuel, some aircraft emergency landed at a small airfield on Kergostrov Island where several of the bombers crash-landed: other aircraft were scattered across the region.

On 15 September, after repairs, 27 Avro Lancasters flew with Barnes Wallis' 5-tonne Tallboy bombs and experimental 500-pound "Johnny Walker" underwater "walking" mines. The raid caused sufficient damage to result in the Tirpitz being moved south to Tromsø for repairs and into range for subsequent British based raids.

Six Lancasters were left in the marshes around Yagodnik. Of these, two were recovered and repaired. They were used in transport and reconnaissance roles by the Soviet forces.

== See also ==
- Lakhta air base, also in Arkhangelsk.

== Bibliography ==
Brickhill, Paul (1954), The Dam Busters, Pan Books
