= Archibald Richardson (Royal Navy officer) =

New Zealand fighter pilot of WWII

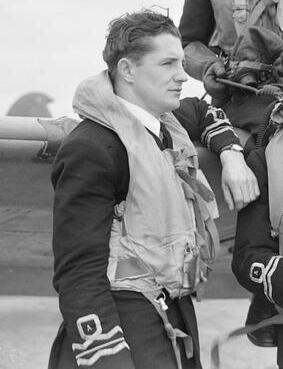
- Richardson aboard the aircraft carrier HMS Furious during Operation Mascot, July 1944
- Born: 20 March 1917; Gisborne, New Zealand
- Died: 24 August 1944 (aged 27) †; Kaafjord, Norway
- Military career
- Allegiance: New Zealand
- Branch: Royal Naval Volunteer Reserve: Fleet Air Arm
- Rank: Lieutenant Commander
- Nickname: 'Ron'
- Commands: 1840 Naval Air Squadron
- Conflicts: Second World War: Operation Torch; Operation Mascot; Operation Goodwood
- Awards: Mention in Despatches

Archibald 'Ron' Richardson (20 March 1917 – 24 August 1944) was a New Zealand fighter pilot who served in the Royal Navy's Fleet Air Arm during the Second World War. He was posthumously mentioned in despatches for his actions during an attack on the German battleship Tirpitz on 24 August 1944.

From Gisborne, Richardson initially joined the Royal New Zealand Air Force on the outbreak of the Second World War but subsequently transferred to the New Zealand Division of the Royal Naval Volunteer Reserve and volunteered for the Fleet Air Arm in order to expedite his flying training. He gained his 'wings' in October 1941 and the following year was posted to serve in 891 Naval Air Squadron. With this unit he was involved in Operation Torch, the invasion of French North Africa. Much of 1943 was spent on instructing duties and in March 1944 he was given command of 1840 Naval Air Squadron. He was killed in action on 24 August 1944 during Operation Goodwood, a FAA mission to attack the Tirpitz at its anchorage at Kaafjord in Norway. His actions during the attack led to a recommendation for the Victoria Cross but this was declined despite an endorsement from Admiral Henry Ruthven Moore, commander of the Home Fleet, and Richardson instead received a posthumous mention in despatches.

== Early life ==
Archibald Richardson, known as Ron, was born on 20 March 1917 at Gisborne in New Zealand. He was educated at Gisborne High School and then took up an electrical engineering apprenticeship with a local firm. He later worked in the industry in Auckland and also served in the Territorial Force.

== Second World War ==
After the outbreak of the Second World War, Richardson joined the Royal New Zealand Air Force. However, it was some time before his flying training could commence and in mid-1940, he was offered the opportunity to transfer to the New Zealand division of the Royal Naval Volunteer Reserve and train for the Fleet Air Arm (FAA) in the United Kingdom. He departed the country aboard SS Tamaroa on 14 September 1940. Arriving at Liverpool in early November, his initial induction into the FAA was at HMS St Vincent, the Royal Navy's shore station establishment at Gosport before proceeding to HMS Daedalus in Hampshire.

In March 1941, Richardson then went onto the Royal Air Force's No. 24 Elementary Flying Training School at Luton, where he flew Miles Magister trainers. His next phase of training was in Canada, and he travelled there in May. He flew North American Harvard trainers at No. 31 Service Flying Training School at Kingston, in Ontario. He duly gained his 'wings' in October and was commissioned as an acting sub-lieutenant.

Back in the United Kingdom by the end of the year, Richardson attended No. 1 Naval Air Fighter School at HMS Heron in Somerset. He was then posted to 791 Naval Air Squadron, a training unit in air gunnery based at Arbroath, as a staff pilot. During his time there he had to make a forced landing when the engine of his aircraft failed. In July 1942 he was posted to the newly formed 891 Naval Air Squadron, which was equipped with the Hawker Sea Hurricane fighter and was based at the shore station HMS Daedalus. After a period of working up for active operations, the squadron embarked on the escort carrier HMS Dasher, destined for the Mediterranean. It flew in Operation Torch, the Allied invasion of French North Africa, providing aerial cover for the invasion beaches.

Richardson was sent to Royal Naval Air Station Yeovilton in April 1943, where he briefly performed instructing duties before moving onto Royal Naval Air Station Henstridge where he was engaged in similar work. He returned to active operations in November with 809 Naval Air Squadron. Equipped with the Supermarine Seafire fighter, this was based at HMS Daedalus after having been involved in operations at Salerno in Italy. In March 1944, and now holding the rank of lieutenant commander, he was given command of 1840 Naval Air Squadron; equipped with the Grumman F6F Hellcat fighter and with its pilots mostly personnel of the Royal Netherlands Navy, this was based at the Royal Navy's shore establishment HMS Ringtail at Burscough. In late June it embarked on the aircraft carrier HMS Indefatigable for a week of training in takeoff and landings at sea.

=== Attacks on the Tirpitz ===
The German battleship Tirpitz was based at Kaafjord in Norway for several months. It was damaged by an attack by British midget submarines during September 1943. In April 1944, the FAA mounted an attack from aircraft carriers which resulted in further damage to the ship. However, Tirpitz remained a threat and another attack, codenamed 'Mascot', was mounted on 17 July. It involved some 89 aircraft including the Hellcats of Richardson's squadron, which had embarked on HMS Furious for the operation. The crew of the Tirpitz had warning of the operation and brought up a smokescreen which affected the accuracy of the attack and the ship was unscathed.

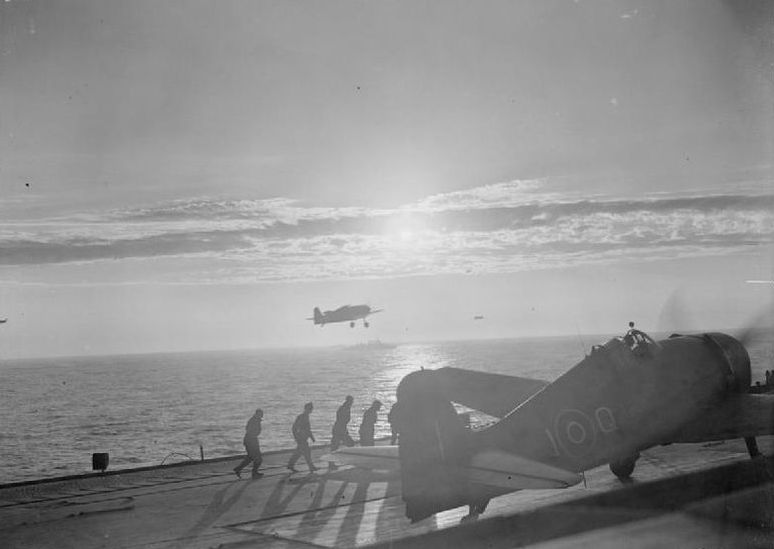
Grumman Hellcat fighters of 1840 Naval Air Squadron returning from their sortie in Operation Mascot, carried out on 17 July 1944

In August the Royal Navy planned its largest attack yet on the ship, Operation Goodwood. It involved five aircraft carriers, 68 fighter-bombers, and 100 fighters, those of 1840 Naval Air Squadron among them. A first sortie was made on 22 August; although poor weather stopped some aircraft from reaching the Tirpitz, Richardson's Hellcats flew from HMS Indefatigable in the role of fighter-bombers and released their bombs although without success. Another attempt was made on 24 August and this time all aircraft reached Kaafjord. Despite intensive anti-aircraft fire Richardson led his squadron's attack against the ship. He made three dives and on the last occasion, his Hellcat was hit by flak and destroyed. Although Operation Goodwood resulted in some hits on Tirpitz, they caused little damage.

The commanding officer of HMS Indefatigable recommended Richardson for a Victoria Cross and this was endorsed by Admiral Henry Ruthven Moore, the commander-in-chief of the Home Fleet. The recommendation, the only one known to be made to a New Zealander serving with naval forces during the Second World War, was declined and instead it was decided that he would be posthumously mentioned in despatches. This was contested by Moore and the matter referred back to the Admiralty Honours and Awards Committee for reconsideration. However, the original decision was maintained and it was judged that had Richardson survived, he would have been awarded the Distinguished Service Order.

Survived by his wife and son, and with no known grave, Richardson is commemorated on the New Zealand Naval Memorial at Devonport Naval Base in Auckland. At the time of his death, it was reported that Richardson's Hellcat had crashed into the bridge of the Tirpitz. However, in 2018, the wreckage of his aircraft was found in hilly terrain near Kaafjord. An investigation of the site suggested that his body was initially buried near the wreckage by the Germans, but was subsequently interred in a military cemetery in Tromsø where several several casualties from the Tirpitz are also buried. Among the interments at the cemetery is a grave belonging to an unidentified New Zealander and Richardson's family believes this contains his body.
