= List of Allied attacks on the German battleship Tirpitz =

The German battleship Tirpitz was attacked on multiple occasions by Allied forces during World War II. While most of the attacks failed to inflict any damage on the battleship, she was placed out of action for a lengthy period following the Operation Source midget submarine attack on 22 September 1943 and for a short period after the Operation Tungsten aircraft carrier strike on 3 April 1944. Tirpitz suffered severe and irreparable damage after being hit by a Tallboy bomb during the Operation Paravane air raid on 15 September 1944, and was sunk with heavy loss of life in the Operation Catechism raid on 12 November that year.

== List of attacks ==
Date	Location	Allied units	Attacking force	Damage	Allied losses	Notes
8/9 October 1940	Wilhelmshaven	RAF Bomber Command	17 Hampdens	None	None	Attacked Tirpitz in dry dock
8/9 January 1941	Wilhelmshaven	RAF Bomber Command	32 Wellington, Whitley, Hampdens	None	None	
29/30 January 1941	Wilhelmshaven	RAF Bomber Command	25 Wellingtons, 9 Hampdens	None	None	
28 February/1 March 1941	Wilhelmshaven	RAF Bomber Command	116 Blenheim, Hampden, Wellington, Whitleys	None	1 Blenheim	75 reported bombing Wilhelmshaven, no damage recorded
28/29 May 1941	Kiel	RAF Bomber Command	14 Whitleys	None	1 Whitley	3 aircraft reached target area, bad weather
20/21 June 1941	Kiel	RAF Bomber Command	47 Wellingtons, 24 Hampdens, 20 Whitleys, 13 Stirling, 11 Halifax heavy bombers	None	2 Wellingtons	Bombed Kiel
28/29 January 1942	Åsenfjorden	Royal Air Force	9 Halifaxs, 7 Stirlings	None	1 Stirling	Night bombing attack.
9 March 1942	At sea off the Lofoten islands	HMS Victorious	12 Albacore torpedo bombers	None	2 Albacores	Attacked during Operation Sportpalast
30/31 March 1942	Fættenfjord	Royal Air Force	33 Halifaxes	None	5 Halifaxes	Most failed to find target on account of bad weather.
27/28 April 1942	Fættenfjord	Royal Air Force	31 Halifaxes, 12 Lancasters	None	5 aircraft	
28/29 April 1942	Fættenfjord	Royal Air Force	23 Halifaxes, 11 Lancasters	None	2 aircraft	
31 October 1942	Trondheimsfjord	Royal Navy	2 Chariot manned torpedoes	None	2 Chariots, 1 trawler	Operation Title failed, mechanical problems
22 September 1943	Kaafjord	Royal Navy	4 X Craft	Serious damage	3 X-craft, 3 killed, 6 captured	Operation Source
10/11 February 1944	Kaafjord	Soviet Air Forces	15 aircraft	None	None	4 aircraft found target
3 April 1944	Kaafjord	Home Fleet carriers: HMS Victorious, HMS Furious, HMS Searcher, HMS Emperor, HMS Pursuer, HMS Fencer	40 Barracuda dive bombers, 80 fighters	14 bomb hits and 1 near miss (4 1600 lb bombs and 11 500lb bombs) and strafing, superficial damage, 122 killed, 316 wounded	3 Barracudas, 1 Hellcat, 9 killed	Operation Tungsten
24 April 1944	Kaafjord	Home Fleet carriers: HMS Victorious, HMS Furious, HMS Searcher, HMS Emperor, HMS Pursuer, HMS Striker.	N/A	None	None	Operation Planet, cancelled, bad weather
15 May 1944	Kaafjord	Home Fleet carriers: HMS Victorious, HMS Furious.	27 Barracudas, 28 Corsairs, 4 Seafires, 4 Wildcats.	None	None	Operation Brawn cancelled, bad weather
28 May 1944	Kaafjord	Home Fleet carriers: HMS Victorious, HMS Furious.	N/A	None	None	Operation Tiger Claw, cancelled, bad weather
17 July 1944	Kaafjord	Home Fleet carriers: HMS Furious, HMS Formidable, HMS Indefatigable.	44 Barracudas, 40 fighters	None	1 Barracuda, 1 Corsair	Operation Mascot
22 August 1944 (am)	Kaafjord	Home Fleet carriers: HMS Formidable, HMS Indefatigable, HMS Furious, HMS Nabob, HMS Trumpeter	44 Barracudas, 53 fighters	None	3 aircraft	Operation Goodwood
22 August 1944 (pm)	Kaafjord	Home Fleet carrier HMS HMS Indefatigable	14 fighters	None	None	Operation Goodwood
24 August 1944	Kaafjord	Home Fleet carriers: HMS Formidable, HMS Indefatigable, HMS Furious.	33 Barracudas, 44 fighters (10 Hellcats, 24 Corsairs, 10 Fireflies)	2 bomb hits (1x1,600lb, 1x500lb), minor damage	6 aircraft	Operation Goodwood
29 August 1944	Kaafjord	Home Fleet carriers: HMS Formidable, HMS Indefatigable.	26 Barracudas, 41 fighters (7 Hellcats, 17 Corsairs and 10 Fireflies, with 7 Seafires used for diversionary attacks).	None	2 aircraft	Operation Goodwood
15 September 1944	Kaafjord	9 Squadron, 617 Squadron	28 Lancasters	1 bomb hit (1x12,000lb Tallboy), severe damage	None	Operation Paravane
29 October 1944	Tromsø	9 Squadron, 617 Squadron	38 Lancasters	Damage from 1 near miss (1x12,000lb Tallboy)	1 Lancaster	Operation Obviate
12 November 1944	Tromsø	9 Squadron, 617 Squadron	32 Lancasters	Uncertain, probably 3 hits and 2 near misses (all 12,000lb Tallboy bombs). Tirpitz sunk, 950–1,204 killed	1 Lancaster	Operation Catechism

== Bibliography ==
- Bennett, G. H. (2012). "Introduction". In Bennett, G. H. (ed.). Hunting Tirpitz: Naval Operations Against Bismarck's Sister Ship. Plymouth: University of Plymouth Press. pp. 7–25. ISBN 978-1-84102-310-6.
- Bishop, Patrick (2012). Target Tirpitz. London: Harper Press. ISBN 978-0-00-743119-9.
- Middlebrook, Martin; Everitt, Chris (1985). The Bomber Command War Diaries: An Operational Reference Book, 1939–1945 (Repr. ed.). Harmondsworth: Viking. ISBN 0-670-80137-2.
- Roskill, S. W. (2004) [1961]. The War at Sea 1939–1945: The Offensive Part II 1st June 1944 – 14th August 1945. History of the Second World War. United Kingdom Military Series. Vol. III (facs. repr. Naval & Military Press, Uckfield ed.). London: HMSO. ISBN 978-1-84-342806-0.
