= 1840 Naval Air Squadron =

Inactive Royal Navy Fleet Air Arm and Reserve Air Squadron

- Squadron badge
- Active: 1944–1945; 1951–1957
- Disbanded: 10 March 1957
- Country: United Kingdom
- Branch: Royal Navy
- Type: Single-seat fighter squadron; Royal Naval Volunteer Reserve Air Squadron
- Role: Carrier-based fighter squadron; Anti-submarine squadron
- Size: ten to twenty aircraft (1944-45)
- Part of: Fleet Air Arm
- Home station: See Naval air stations section for full list.
- Mottos: Allied and avenging
- Engagements: World War II: European theatre of World War II; Operation Mascot; Operation Offspring; Operation Goodwood; Pacific War; Operation Iceberg
- Battle honours: Norway 1944; Okinawa 1945

Commanders
- Notable commanders: Lieutenant Commander(A) Archibald Richardson, RNZNVR

Insignia
- Squadron Badge Description: White, a cat winged proper issuing from flames also proper (1944)
- Identification Markings: single letters (Hellcat); K7A+ (Hellcat March 1945); 201-212 (Firefly); 217-221 (Harvard); 601-602 (Sea Prince); 855-864, 875-884 (all aircraft January 1956)
- Fin Shore Codes: FD (Firefly, Harvard, Sea Prince); FD (all aircraft January 1956)

Aircraft flown
- Fighter: Grumman Hellcat
- Reconnaissance: Fairey Firefly; Fairey Gannet
- Trainer: North American Harvard; Avro Anson; Boulton Paul Sea Balliol
- Transport: Percival Sea Prince

1840 Naval Air Squadron (1840 NAS) was a Fleet Air Arm (FAA) naval air squadron of the United Kingdom’s Royal Navy (RN). During World War II over 80% of the pilots were from the Royal Netherlands Naval Aviation Service. Formed at HMS Ringtail, RNAS Burscough in March 1944, as a fighter squadron it started with Grumman Hellcat fighter aircraft. The squadron trained at HMS Blackcap, RNAS Stretton and in a couple of airbases in Northern Ireland, and conducted deck landing training on HMS Trumpeter in June 1944. The squadron joined HMS Indefatigable in June. After disembarking at HMS Landrail, RNAS Machrihanish in early July, it moved to HMS Sparrowhawk, RNAS Hatston a few days later, which became its shore base. The squadron operated from HMS Furious on July 9, HMS Formidable on July 31, and HMS Indefatigable again on August 7 and 15.

While on HMS Furious, the squadron participated in an attack on the battleship Tirpitz and repeated this mission while on HMS Indefatigable. In September and October 1944, while at HMS Gannet, RNAS Eglinton, the squadron joined the 3rd Naval Fighter Wing before moving to HMS Speaker in December. It re-equipped with Hellcat IIs at HMS Wagtail, RNAS Ayr on New Year’s Eve, then re-embarked to support the British Pacific Fleet's auxiliary ships. The squadron was disbanded into 1839 Naval Air Squadron on 27 April 1945.

== History ==
=== Single-seat fighter squadron (1944-1945) ===
1840 Naval Air Squadron was initially intended to be a single-seat fighter unit, comprising ten Grumman Wildcat Mk V fighter aircraft, with a formation date set for 15 October 1943, at HMS Gannet, the Royal Naval Air Station at Eglinton, County Londonderry, Northern Ireland. However, this plan was ultimately abandoned, and the squadron was established instead on 1 March 1944, at RNAS Burscough (HMS Ringtail), Lancashire, England, under the leadership of Lieutenant Commander(A) A.R. Richardson RNZNVR, equipped with ten Grumman Hellcat F. Mk. I single-seat fighter-bomber aircraft. These were the Fleet Air Arm’s equivalent of the United States Navy's F6F-3 variant, powered by a Pratt & Whitney R-2800 Double Wasp radial piston aircraft engine. Notably, a significant number of the squadron's pilots were of Dutch origin, primarily drawn from the Netherlands Naval Aviation Service.

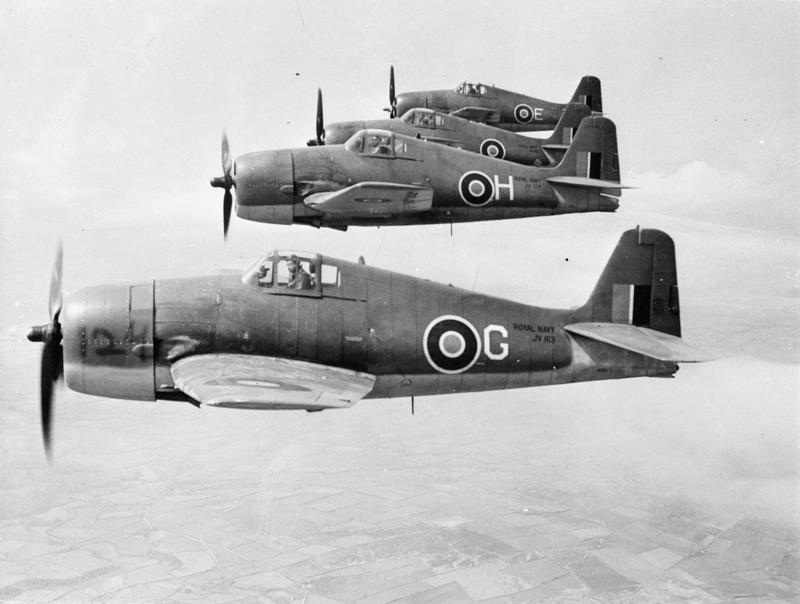
Formation flying by Dutch pilots of 1840 Naval Air Squadron in Grumman Hellcat aircraft based at RNAS Eglinton, Northern Ireland

Following their familiarisation to the aircraft, the squadron relocated to a RNAS Stretton (HMS Blackcap), Cheshire, England, on 13 March to commence training in preparation for active deployment. The training regimen encompassed navigation drills, low-altitude flying, formation manoeuvres, and air combat manoeuvring. Subsequently, one month later, the squadron transferred to RNAS Eglinton (HMS Gannet), in Northern Ireland.

The squadron relocated once more on 30 May to RNAS Ballyhalbert, County Down, Northern Ireland. Starting in June, a contingent of eight aircraft engaged in Deck Landing Training (DLT) utilising the Ruler-class escort carrier, HMS Trumpeter, concluding their exercises on the 25. On that same day, the entire squadron embarked on the Fleet Carrier, the Implacable-class aircraft carrier, HMS Indefatigable to participate in an at-sea work-up in the Clyde training area, ultimately disembarking at RNAS Machrihanish (HMS Landrail), Argyll and Bute, Scotland, on 2 July.

They subsequently proceeded northward to RNAS Hatston (HMS Sparrowhawk), in the Orkney Islands, arriving on the 6, in preparation for their initial operational deployment with the Courageous-class battlecruiser converted to an aircraft carrier, HMS Furious, for an assault on the German battleship Tirpitz, under Operation Mascot and embarked to join the carrier on 9 July. The squadron subsequently embarked on HMS Indefatigable for Operation Offspring, a second strike at Tirpitz, departing from Scapa Flow on 8 August. The operation began on 9 August and was successfully completed with the Force withdrawing and returning to Scapa Flow on 11 August. On 14 August, 1840 Naval Air Squadron disembarked to RNAS Hatston. Operation Goodwood constituted the subsequent offensive against the battleship Tirpitz. The aircraft carrier departed from Scapa Flow in mid-August and returned at the end of the month, with the squadron disembarking at RNAS Grimsetter (HMS Robin) on the Mainland of Orkney.

During the months of September and October in 1944, the squadron was stationed at RNAS Eglinton (HMS Gannet), where it became part of the 3rd Naval Fighter Wing, along with 800, 808, 885 Naval Air Squadrons. Subsequently, on 16 December, the squadron embarkied in the Ruler-class escort carrier, HMS Speaker. On New Year's Eve in 1944, the unit relocated to RNAS Ayr (HMS Wagtail), South Ayrshire, Scotland, marking a significant transition as the Grumman Hellcat F. Mk. I aircraft were retired from service. In their place, the squadron received the upgraded Mk.II variants, thereby enhancing their operational capabilities. These were the British counterpart to the United States Navy's F6F-5 variant powered by an improved Pratt & Whitney R-2800-10W Double Wasp radial piston engine.

1840 Naval Air Squadron re-embarked and HMS Speaker set sail for the Pacific region. Their mission involved remaining with the carrier, which was designated to function as a Combat Air Patrol (CAP) carrier, tasked with providing aerial support for the vessels of the British Pacific Fleet (BPF) train. However, on 27 April, the squadron was disbanded while aboard HMS Speaker, with the intention of augmenting 1839 Naval Air Squadron, which was embarked in the Illustrious-class aircraft carrier, HMS Indomitable.

== Royal Naval Volunteer Reserve Air Squadron ==
=== Anti-submarine squadron ===
On 14 April 1951, 1840 Naval Air Squadron was reformed at RNAS Culham (HMS Hornbill), Oxfordshire, England, as a Royal Naval Volunteer Reserve (RNVR) anti-submarine unit, equipped with six Fairey Firefly FR.Mk 4 fighter-reconnaissance aircraft and two North American Harvard advanced trainer aircraft. On 30 June, it relocated to RNAS Ford (HMS Peregrine), Sussex, England, where nine Fairey Firefly AS.Mk 6 anti-submarine aircraft replaced the FR.Mk 4 aircraft.

Flying operations were conducted at RNAS Ford on a weekly basis. Pilots and Observers were mandated to complete two weeks of continuous training annually, alongside one-hundred hours of non-continuous training, and to fulfill twelve weekends of squadron duty. During this period, they were anticipated to accumulate a minimum of seventy-five and a maximum of one-hundred and twenty-five flying hours. The two weeks dedicated to continuous annual training in air warfare and weapons were conducted at various naval air stations or aboard a training carrier.

On 1 June 1952, the Channel Air Division was established to oversee the RNVR units at RNAS Ford. Subsequently, on 1 October 1952, 1840A Naval Air Squadron was created as a derivative unit, which transitioned to 1842 Naval Air Squadron in March 1953. During this period, aircraft resources were consolidated, with the number of Fairey Firefly aircraft, including trainers, rising to fifteen. This fleet was later supplanted by eleven Fairey Gannet AS.1 anti-submarine warfare aircraft, which were introduced in February 1956. 1840 Naval Air Squadron was officially disbanded on 10 March 1957, a decision that was part of the defence reductions implemented during that year.

== Aircraft flown ==
1840 Naval Air Squadron flew a number of different aircraft types, including:

- Grumman Hellcat F. Mk. I fighter aircraft (March - December 1944)
- Grumman Hellcat F. Mk. II fighter aircraft (August 1944 - May 1945)
- Fairey Firefly FR.Mk 4 fighter-reconnaissance aircraft (April - July 1951)
- North American Harvard IlB advanced trainer aircraft (April 1951 - December 1954)
- Fairey Firefly T.Mk 2 armed operational training aircraft (July 1951 - June 1956)
- Fairey Firefly AS.Mk 6 anti-submarine aircraft (July 1951 - May 1956)
- Avro Anson Mk I multirole training aircraft (October 1951 - July 1953)
- North American Harvard III advanced trainer aircraft (July 1952 - February 1954)
- Percival Sea Prince T1 transport aircraft (June 1953 - March 1956)
- Boulton Paul Sea Balliol T.Mk 21 advanced trainer aircraft (March 1954 - September 1955)
- Fairey Gannet AS.1 anti-submarine warfare aircraft (February 1956 - January 1957)
- Fairey Gannet T.2 dual control trainer aircraft (February 1956 - January 1957)
- Fairey Firefly T.Mk 7 ASW training aircraft (March - November 1956)

== Battle honours ==
The following Battle Honours have been awarded to 1840 Naval Air Squadron:

- Norway 1944
- Okinawa 1945

== Assignments ==
1840 Naval Air Squadron was assigned as needed to form part of a number of larger units:

- 3rd Naval Fighter Wing (4 August 1944 - 27 April 1945)

== Naval air stations ==
1840 Naval Air Squadron operated mostly from a number of naval air stations of the Royal Navy in the United Kingdom and overseas, a few Royal Navy fleet carriers and a couple of escort carriers:

1944 - 1945

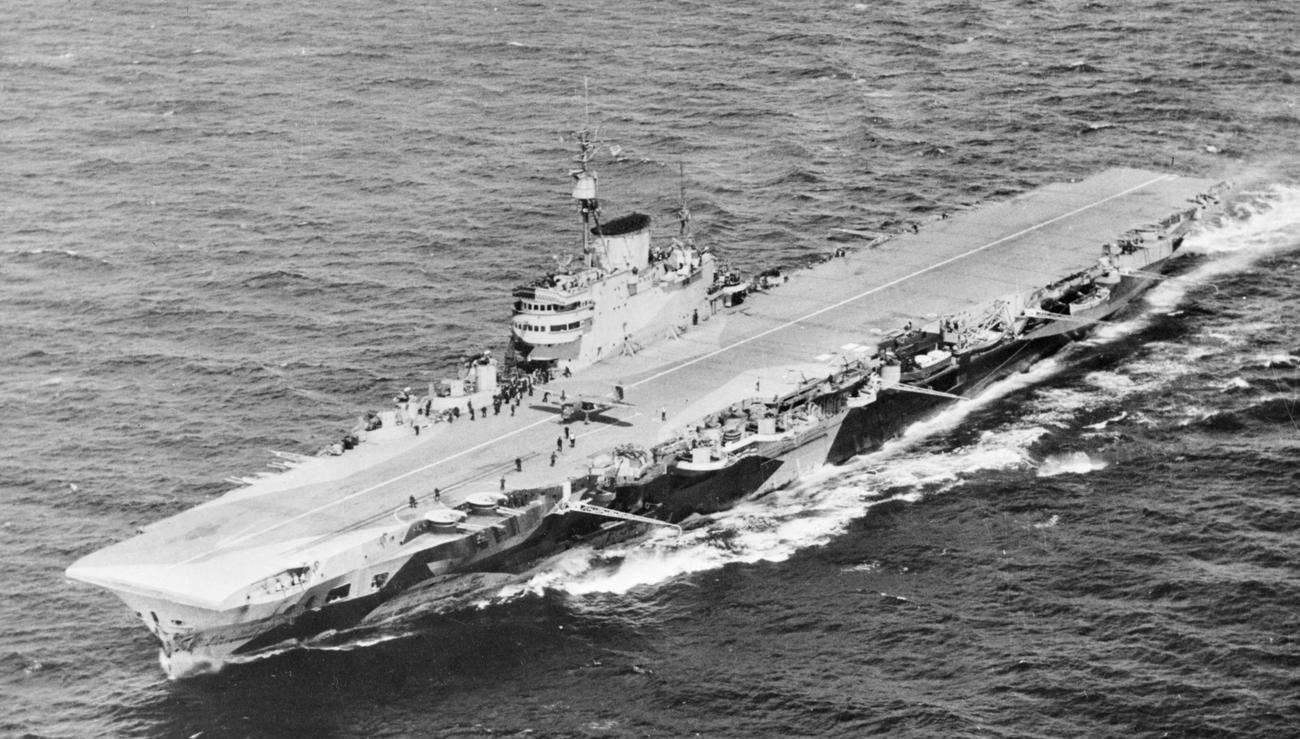
HMS Indefatigable

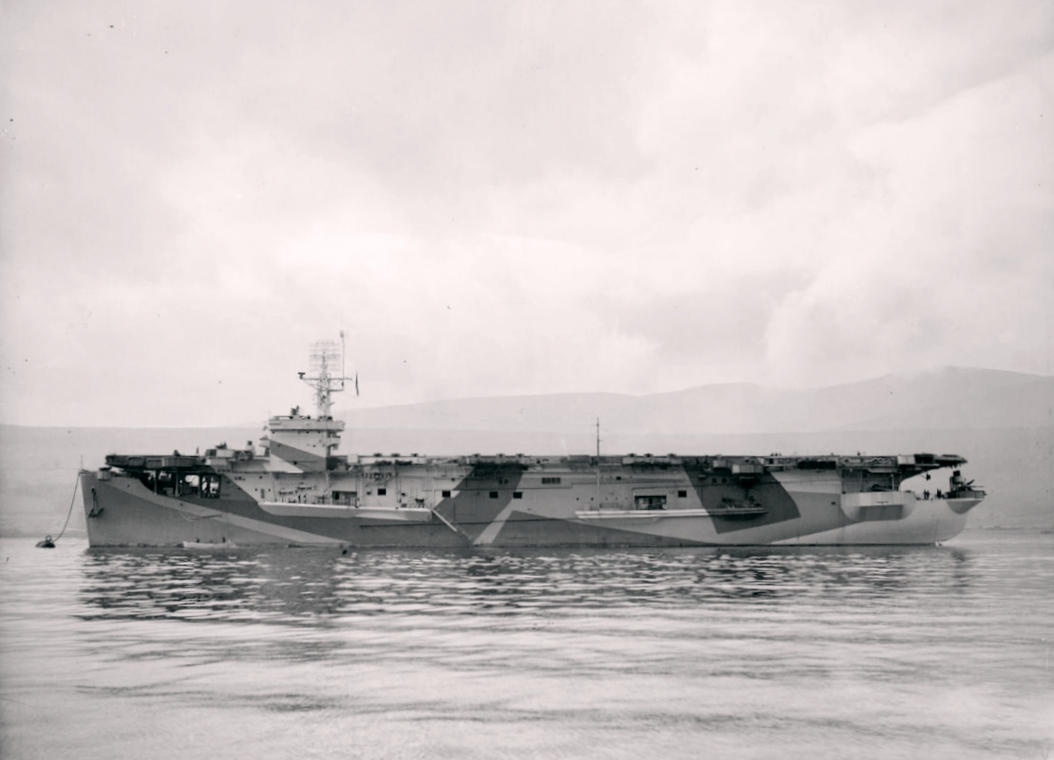
HMS Speaker

- Royal Naval Air Station Burscough (HMS Ringtail) (1 - 13 March 1944)
- Royal Naval Air Station Stretton (HMS Blackcap) (13 March - 13 April 1944)
- Royal Naval Air Station Eglinton (HMS Gannet) (13 April - 30 May 1944)
- Royal Naval Air Station Ballyhalbert (30 May - 25 June 1944)
  - HMS Trumpeter (Detachment eight aircraft Deck Landing Training 15 - 25 June 1944)
- HMS Indefatigable (25 June - 2 July 1944)
- Royal Air Force Stornoway-Royal Air Force Tiree-Royal Naval Air Station Machrihanish (HMS Landrail) (2 - 6 July 1944)
- Royal Naval Air Station Hatston (HMS Sparrowhawk) (6 - 9 July 1944)
- HMS Furious (9 - 19 July 1944)
- Royal Naval Air Station Hatston (HMS Sparrowhawk) (19 - 31 July 1944)
- HMS Formidable (31 July - 5 August 1944)
- Royal Naval Air Station Hatston (HMS Sparrowhawk) (5 - 7 August 1944)
- HMS Indefatigable (7 - 12 August 1944)
- Royal Naval Air Station Hatston (HMS Sparrowhawk) (12 - 15 August 1944)
  - Royal Naval Air Station Eglinton (HMS Gannet) (Detachment eight aircraft 13 - 18 August 1944)
- HMS Indefatigable (15 August - 1 September 1944)
- Royal Naval Air Station Grimsetter (HMS Robin) (1 - 2 September 1944)
- Royal Naval Air Station Eglinton (HMS Gannet) (2 September - 24 October 1944)
- Royal Naval Air Station Ballyhalbert (24 October - 9 November 1944)
- Royal Naval Air Station Ayr (HMS Wagtail) (9 - 16 November 1944)
- Royal Naval Air Station Ballyhalbert (16 November - 16 December 1944)
- HMS Speaker (16 - 23 December 1944)
- Royal Naval Air Station Abbotsinch (HMS Sanderling) (23 - 31 December 1944)
- Royal Naval Air Station Ayr (HMS Wagtail) (re-equip) (31 December 1944 - 31 January 1945)
- HMS Speaker (3 January - 23 February 1945)
- Royal Naval Air Station Schofields (HMS Nabthorpe) (23 February - 9 March 1945)
- HMS Speaker (9 March - 27 April 1945)
- disbanded into 1839 Naval Air Squadron - (27 April 1945)

1951 - 1957

- Royal Naval Air Station Culham (HMS Hornbill) (14 April - 30 June 1951)
- Royal Naval Air Station Ford (HMS Peregrine) (30 June 1951 - 10 March 1957)
  - Annual training:
    - HMS Triumph (9 - 21 June 1952)
    - Royal Naval Air Station Eglinton (HMS Gannet) ('A' Flight) (16 - 30 May 1953), ('B' Flight) (22 August - 5 September 1953)
    - Royal Naval Air Station Hal Far (HMS Falcon) (9 - 23 May 1954)
    - HMS Illustrious (3 - 11 October 1954)
    - Royal Naval Air Station Eglinton (HMS Gannet) (20 August - 3 September 1955)
- disbanded - (10 March 1957)

=== 1840A Naval Air Squadron Squadron ===
- Royal Naval Air Station Ford (HMS Peregrine) (1 October 1952 - 28 March 1953)
- became 1842 Naval Air Squadron - (28 March 1953)

== Commanding officers ==
List of commanding officers of 1840 Naval Air Squadron with date of appointment:

1944 - 1945

- Lieutenant Commander(A) A.R. Richardson, RNZNVR, from 1 March 1944 (KiA 24 August 1944)
- Lieutenant(A) G.J. Zegers de Beijl, RNIN, from 25 August 1944
- Lieutenant Commander(A) B.H.C. Nation, RN, from 22 September 1944
- disbanded - 27 April 1945

1951 - 1957

- Lieutenant Commander(A) N.H. Bovey, DSC, RNVR, from 14 April 1951
- Lieutenant Commander(A) A.P.D. Simms, RNVR, from 1 June 1952
- disbanded - 10 March 1957

Note: Abbreviation (A) signifies Air Branch of the RN or RNVR.
