= HMS Indefatigable (R10) =

1944 Implacable-class aircraft carrier of the Royal Navy

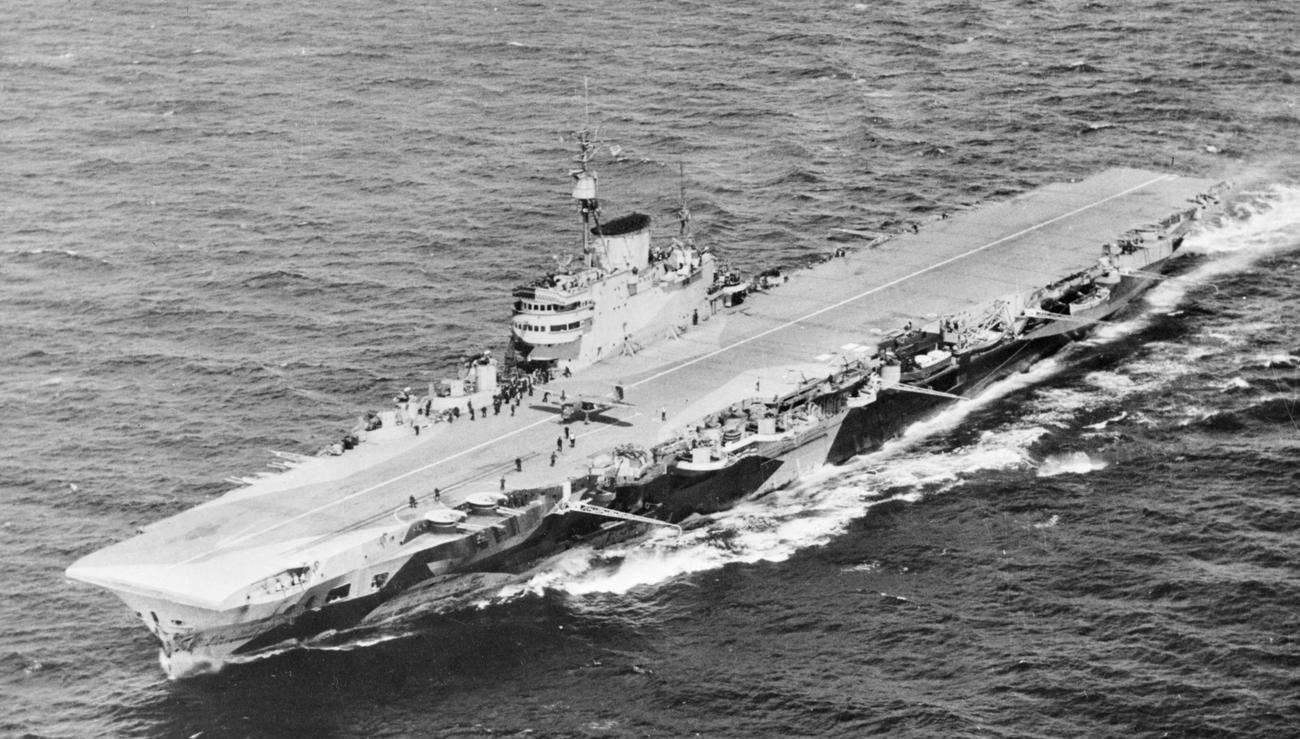
- Aerial view of Indefatigable at sea, 7 November 1944

History

United Kingdom
- Name: Indefatigable
- Builder: John Brown & Co., Clydebank, Scotland
- Laid down: 3 November 1939
- Launched: 8 December 1942
- Completed: 3 May 1944
- Commissioned: 8 December 1943
- Decommissioned: December 1946
- Recommissioned: 28 May 1950
- Decommissioned: October 1954
- Identification: Pennant number: 10
- Motto: Deo Adjuvante (With God's Help)
- Honours and awards: Palembang 1945; Okinawa 1945; Japan 1945
- Fate: Sold for scrap, September 1956

General characteristics
- Class & type: Implacable-class aircraft carrier
- Displacement: 32,110 long tons (32,630 t) (deep load)
- Length: 766 ft 6 in (233.6 m) (o/a); 730 ft (222.5 m) (waterline)
- Beam: 95 ft 9 in (29.2 m)
- Draught: 29 ft 4 in (8.9 m) (deep load)
- Installed power: 8 Admiralty 3-drum boilers; 148,000 shp (110,000 kW)
- Propulsion: 4 shafts; 4 geared steam turbines
- Speed: 32.5 knots (60.2 km/h; 37.4 mph)
- Range: 6,900 nmi (12,800 km; 7,900 mi) at 20 knots (37 km/h; 23 mph)
- Complement: 2,300 (1945)
- Sensors & processing systems: 1 × Type 277 height-finding radar; 1 × Type 279 early-warning radar; 1 × Type 281 early-warning radar; 6 × Type 282 gunnery radars; 4 × Type 285 gunnery radars
- Armament: 8 × twin QF 4.5-inch dual-purpose guns; 5 × octuple, 1 × quadruple QF 2-pdr anti-aircraft guns; 19 × twin, 17 × single Oerlikon 20 mm anti-aircraft guns
- Armour: Waterline belt: 4.5 in (114 mm); Flight deck: 3 in (76 mm); Bulkheads: 2 in (51 mm); Hangar sides: 2 in (51 mm); Magazines: 3–4.5 in (76–114 mm)
- Aircraft carried: 81
- Aviation facilities: 1 catapult

HMS Indefatigable was one of two Implacable-class aircraft carriers built for the Royal Navy (RN) during World War II. Completed in 1944, her aircraft made several attacks that year against the German battleship Tirpitz, inflicting only light damage; they also raided targets in Norway. The ship was transferred to the British Pacific Fleet (BPF) at the end of the year and attacked Japanese-controlled oil refineries in Sumatra in January 1945 before joining the American forces in March as they prepared to invade the island of Okinawa in Operation Iceberg. Indefatigable and the BPF joined the Americans in attacking the Japanese Home Islands in July and August. Following the end of hostilities she visited ports in Australia, New Zealand and South Africa.

After returning to the UK in early 1946, Indefatigable was modified for transport duties, and ferried troops and civilians for the rest of the year before she was reduced to reserve. She was recommissioned in 1950 as a training ship for service with the Home Fleet Training Squadron, participating in exercises and making several port visits overseas. The Board of Admiralty decided that she was redundant in early 1954 and decommissioned her later that year. Indefatigable was sold for scrap the following year, and scrapped between November 1956 and April 1959.

== Design and description ==
The Implacable class were ordered under the 1938 Naval Programme by the Chamberlain government as part of the general rearmament begun in response to the rise of Nazi Germany and Fascist Italy. The design originated as an improved version of the Illustrious-class aircraft carriers and was intended to be 2 knots (3.7 km/h; 2.3 mph) faster and carry an additional dozen aircraft over the 30-knot (56 km/h; 35 mph) speed and 36 aircraft of the earlier ships. To remain within the 23,000 long tons (23,000 t) limit allowed by the Second London Naval Treaty, these improvements could only be made by reducing armour protection. Indefatigable was 766 feet 6 inches (233.6 m) long overall and 730 feet (222.5 m) at the waterline. Her beam was 95 feet 9 inches (29.2 m) at the waterline, and she had a draught of 29 feet 4 inches (8.9 m) at deep load. The Implacable-class ships were significantly overweight and displaced 32,110 long tons (32,630 t) at deep load. The ships had metacentric heights of 4.06 feet (1.2 m) at light load and 6.91 feet (2.1 m) at deep load as completed. Indefatigable's complement was approximately 2,300 officers and ratings in 1945.

The ships had four Parsons geared steam turbines, each driving one shaft, using steam supplied by eight Admiralty 3-drum boilers. The turbines were designed to produce a total of 148,000 shaft horsepower (110,000 kW), enough to give the Indefatigable-class ships a maximum speed of 32.5 knots (60.2 km/h; 37.4 mph). On sea trials, Indefatigable reached a speed of 32.06 knots (59.38 km/h; 36.89 mph) with 150,935 shp (112,552 kW). She carried enough fuel oil to give her a range of 6,900 nautical miles (12,800 km; 7,900 mi) at 20 knots (37 km/h; 23 mph).

The 760-foot (231.6 m) armoured flight deck had a maximum width of 102 feet (31.1 m). A single hydraulic aircraft catapult was fitted on the forward part of the flight deck. The Implacable-class carriers were equipped with two lifts on the centreline, the forward of which measured 45 by 33 feet (13.7 by 10.1 m) and served only the upper hangar, and the aft lift (45 by 22 feet (13.7 by 6.7 m)), which served both hangars. The upper hangar was 458 feet (139.6 m) long and the lower hangar was 208 feet (63.4 m) long; both had a maximum width of 62 feet (18.9 m). Each hangar had a height of only 14 feet which precluded storage of Lend-Lease Vought F4U Corsair fighters as well as many post-war aircraft and helicopters. Designed to stow 48 aircraft in their hangars, the use of a permanent deck park allowed the Implacable class to accommodate up to 81 aircraft. The additional crewmen, maintenance personnel and facilities needed to support these aircraft were housed in the lower hangar. The ships were provided with 94,650 imperial gallons (430,300 L; 113,670 US gal) of aviation gasoline.

=== Armament, electronics and protection ===
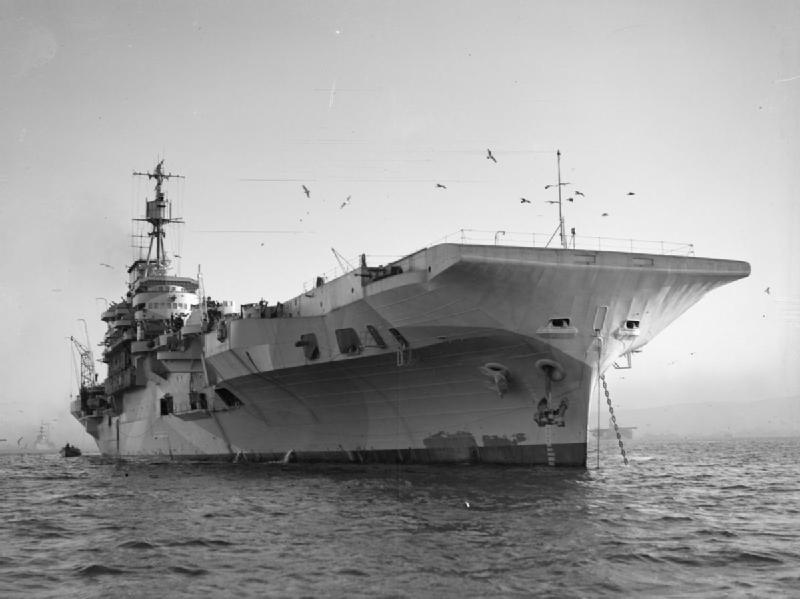
Water-level view of Indefatigable at anchor

The ship's main armament consisted of sixteen quick-firing (QF) 4.5-inch (114 mm) dual-purpose guns in eight twin-gun turrets, four in sponsons on each side of the hull. Unlike the Illustrious-class ships, the roofs of the gun turrets were flat and flush with the flight deck. The gun had a maximum range of 20,760 yards (18,980 m). Indefatigable's light anti-aircraft defences included five octuple mounts for QF 2-pounder ("pom-pom") anti-aircraft (AA) guns, two on the flight deck forward of the island, one on the aft part of the island, and two in sponsons on the port side of the hull. A single quadruple 2-pounder mount was also fitted on the port side of the hull. The 2-pounder gun had a maximum range of 6,800 yards (6,200 m).

The ship was also fitted with 55 Oerlikon 20 mm autocannon in 17 single and 19 twin-gun mounts. These guns had a maximum range of 4,800 yards (4,400 m), but some were replaced by 40 mm Bofors AA guns when the ships were transferred to the Pacific Theatre as the 20 mm (0.79 in) shell was unlikely to destroy a kamikaze before it hit the ship. The Bofors gun had a maximum range of 10,750 yards (9,830 m). By August 1945, Indefatigable had 10 single Bofors guns, plus 14 twin and 12 single Oerlikon mounts. By April 1946 these had been reduced to 11 Bofors guns, 6 twin and 7 single Oerlikon guns.

Details of the Implacable-class ships' radar suite are not readily available. They were fitted with the Type 277 surface-search/height-finding radar on top of the bridge and a Type 293 target indicator radar on the foremast. Victorious, one of the Illustrious-class ships upon which Indefatigable's design was based, also carried Type 279 and Type 281B early-warning radars. Type 282 and Type 285 gunnery radars were mounted on the fire-control directors.

The Implacable-class ships had a flight deck protected by 3 inches (76 mm) of armour. The sides of the hangars were either 1.5 inches (38 mm) or 2 inches (51 mm). (Note: Sources disagree about the thickness of this armour. Historians David K. Brown, H. T. Lenton, and Norman Friedman believe that it was probably only 1.5 inches thick, but other sources give 2 inches.) The ends of the hangars were protected by 2-inch bulkheads and the armour of the hangar deck ranged from 1.5 to 2.5 inches (38 to 64 mm) in thickness. The waterline armour belt was 4.5 inches (114 mm) thick, but only covered the central portion of the ship. The belt was closed by 1.5 to 2-inch transverse bulkheads fore and aft. The underwater defence system was a layered system of liquid- and air-filled compartments as used in the Illustrious class. The magazines for the 4.5-inch guns lay outside the armoured citadel and were protected by 2 to 3-inch roofs, 4.5-inch sides and 1.5 to 2-inch ends.

== Construction and career ==
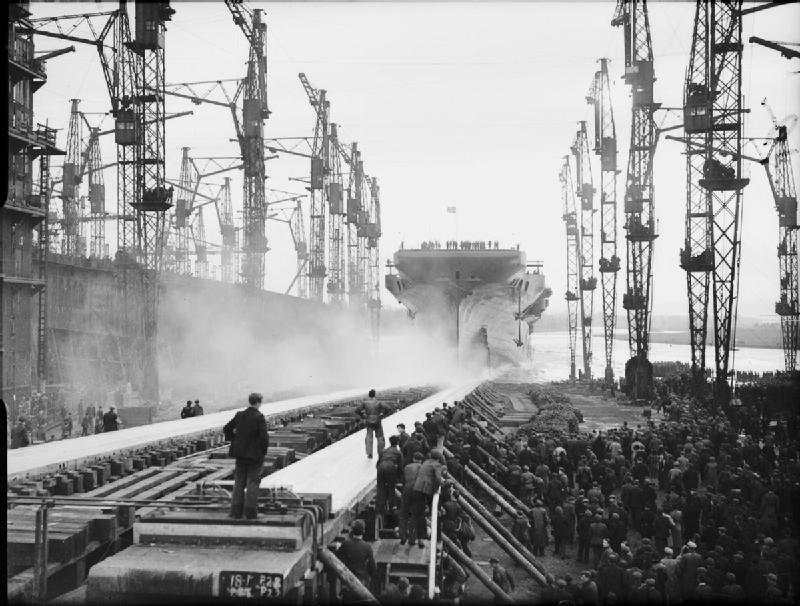
The launching of Indefatigable, 8 December 1942

Indefatigable was laid down by John Brown & Co. at their shipyard in Clydebank on 3 November 1939 as Yard Number 565. She was launched on 8 December 1942 by Victoria of Hesse, Dowager Marchioness of Milford Haven. Captain Quintin Graham was appointed to command the ship in August 1943. While fitting out, in order to confound the enemy, a ruse known as Operation Bijou, initiated by London Controlling Section, was launched whereby it was made known that Indefatigable had already entered service. Ultra decrypts revealed that the Japanese believed the deception, with operatives including Malcolm Muggeridge and Peter Fleming supplying disinformation for more than a year, sufficient to make the enemy believe the vessel had gone to the Far East and returned to the Clyde for a refit, by which time she was actually finished.

The ship was commissioned on 8 December 1943 and began sea trials, which revealed many problems that required rectification and delayed her formal completion until 3 May 1944. While Indefatigable was still conducting builder's trials, a de Havilland Mosquito landed aboard on 25 March, piloted by Lieutenant Eric Brown (this is often cited as the first landing by a twin-engined aeroplane on an aircraft carrier, but in fact a Potez 565 had landed on and taken off from the French carrier Béarn in 1936). The ship was assigned to the Home Fleet and was working up over the next several months while the Fairey Fireflies of 1770 Squadron flew aboard on 18 May. The squadron was followed by the Fairey Barracuda torpedo bombers of 826 Squadron in June.

=== Norwegian operations ===
Indefatigable's first mission was a brief sortie on 1 July 1944 to provide air cover for the ocean liner RMS Queen Elizabeth that was ferrying American troops to Britain. Upon her return, Indefatigable embarked the Supermarine Seafire fighters of 887 Squadron and the Barracudas of 820 Squadron, completing No. 9 Naval Torpedo-Bomber Reconnaissance Wing, over the next week. Her first combat mission was an attack on the battleship Tirpitz in Kaafjord on 17 July with two other Home Fleet carriers (Operation Mascot). She contributed 23 Barracudas and 12 Fireflies to the mission; the former attacked the battleship while the Fireflies strafed the flak positions defending her. A smoke screen prevented most of the Barracudas from seeing their target and they failed to hit Tirpitz. One Barracuda was forced to ditch near the carrier and its crew was rescued by the destroyer Verulam.

894 Squadron, equipped with Seafires, landed aboard after the attack on 24 July to complete No. 24 Naval Fighter Wing. Indefatigable and several escort carriers attacked targets in Norway on 10 August, destroying 6 Messerschmitt Bf 110 fighters and sinking a minesweeper. For Operation Goodwood, a series of attacks on Tirpitz, the Grumman F6F Hellcat fighters of 1840 Squadron replaced the Barracudas of 826 Squadron. The first mission took place on the morning of 22 August when Indefatigable launched 12 Barracudas, 11 Fireflies, 8 Hellcats, and 8 Seafires against the German battleship and nearby targets. A smoke screen again protected Tirpitz and no damage was inflicted; two Seafires failed to return. Another attack was made later in the day without effect. A further attack could not be mounted until 24 August because of bad weather; for this mission the carrier contributed 12 Barracudas, 11 Fireflies and 4 Seafires, all of which returned. (Note: Thomas states that the commanding officer of 1840 Squadron was lost on 24 August, but McCart does not list any Hellcats flying that day. Sturtivant does show the named pilot as commander of 1840 Squadron, although his successor is not named until 12 September.) Tirpitz was lightly damaged by two hits during this attack, one a 500-pound (230 kg) bomb and the other a 1,600-pound (730 kg) armour-piercing bomb. The latter penetrated the armoured deck but failed to explode and would probably have inflicted serious damage, possibly even sinking the ship, had it done so. A final attack was made five days later, again without effect. 887 Squadron sank seven seaplanes at their moorings at Banak during the operation.

=== Indian Ocean and Pacific operations ===
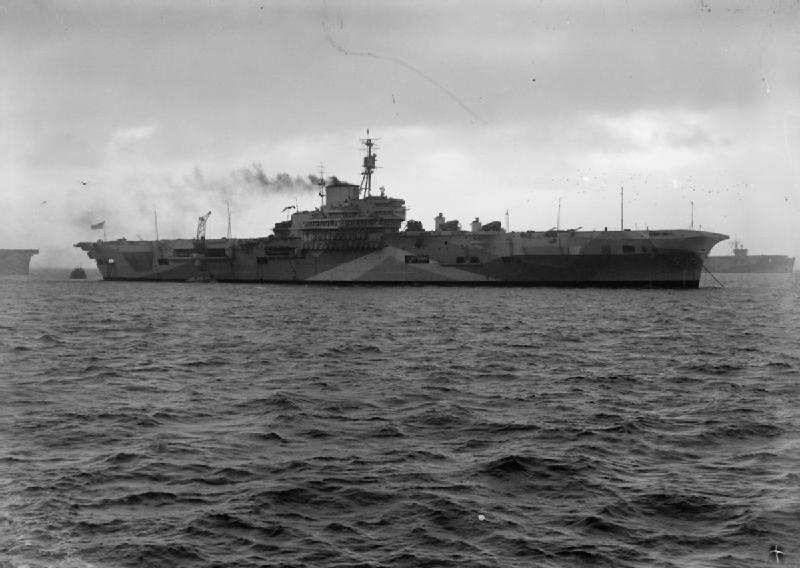
Profile view of Indefatigable at anchor

On 19 September 1944, Indefatigable sortied from Scapa Flow to attack targets near Tromsø, but the operation was cancelled because of bad weather. The ship underwent a brief refit at her builder's yard between 28 September and 8 November. She became the flagship of the 1st Aircraft Carrier Squadron (1st ACS) when Rear Admiral Sir Philip Vian hoisted his flag on 15 November. The following day, King George VI inspected the ship; the ground crews later embarked for 820, 887, 894 and 1770 Squadrons. Their aircraft, 40 Seafires, 12 Fireflies, and 21 Grumman TBF Avenger torpedo bombers, followed on 19 November, and she sailed for the Far East to join the British Pacific Fleet. Indefatigable arrived at Colombo, Ceylon, on 10 December and Vian transferred his flag to Indomitable.

Together with Victorious and Indomitable, Indefatigable attacked an oil refinery at Pangkalan Brandan, Sumatra on 4 January 1945 (Operation Lentil). She embarked six photoreconnaissance Hellcats of 888 Squadron for the attack; her only contribution to the attack itself was the Fireflies of 1770 Squadron, which used RP-3 rocket projectiles on their targets. The squadron claimed to have shot down a Nakajima Ki-43 "Oscar", for the loss of a Firefly that ran out of fuel and had to ditch next to the ship. After Indefatigable's return, Admiral Lord Louis Mountbatten, Supreme Allied Commander South East Asia Command, addressed the crew on 11 January.

En route to Sydney to prepare for operations in the Pacific, the BPF's carriers attacked oil refineries near Palembang, Sumatra, on 24 and 29 January (Operation Meridian). The ship's Seafires lacked the range to reach the targets so they were retained on combat air patrols (CAP) over the fleet for both attacks. She contributed 10 of her Avengers and all of her Fireflies to the first attack, which destroyed most of the oil storage tanks and cut the refinery's output by half for three months. Five days later, the BPF attacked a different refinery and 820 Squadron again contributed 10 Avengers to the attack while 1770 Squadron added nine Fireflies. The latter squadron also flew two Fireflies on an armed reconnaissance mission over an airfield that lay between the carriers and their target. The attack was very successful at heavy cost, but the losses of Indefatigable's squadrons are not available. Her Seafires shot down a Mitsubishi Ki-46 "Dinah" reconnaissance aircraft searching for the fleet and 5 Kawasaki Ki-48 "Lily" bombers that attacked at low level.

The BPF arrived in Sydney on 10 February; the crews received leave and the ships got some maintenance before they sailed for the BPF's advance base at Manus Island, in the Admiralty Islands, on 27 February. They arrived on 7 March and exercised together before sailing for Ulithi on 18 March. The BPF joined the American Fifth Fleet there two days later to participate in the preliminary operations for the invasion of Okinawa. The British role during the operation was to neutralise airfields on the Sakishima Islands, between Okinawa and Formosa, beginning on 26 March. Her Seafires were again retained to defend the fleet and only her Avengers and Fireflies attacked the airfields. Her Seafire squadrons lacked 13 of their authorised strength of 50 pilots and could not sustain the pace of the first day of operations, when they flew 72 sorties. After a break at the end of the month to refuel, Indefatigable became the first British carrier to be hit by a kamikaze the day after flying operations resumed, when one of the Japanese planes evaded the CAP and struck the base of the carrier's island on 1 April. The bomb it carried did not detonate and this limited casualties to 21 men killed and 27 wounded. Damage to the ship was minimal and the flight deck was back in operation thirty minutes later.

On 12 and 13 April, the BPF switched targets to airfields in northern Formosa. On the first day, a pair of Fireflies encountered five Mitsubishi Ki-51 "Sonia" dive bombers and shot down four of them. A flight of four Seafires on CAP spotted four Japanese fighters, three Mitsubishi A6M Zeroes and a Kawasaki Ki-61 "Tony" later that morning, and shot down one Zero. The BPF returned to the Sakishima Islands on 17 April before retiring to Leyte Gulf to rest and resupply. Wastage of Seafires to all causes was very heavy during the operation with 25 out of 40 lost or damaged beyond repair and only 5 replacements received. Their short range and lack of endurance was considered by Vian to be a severe handicap for the BPF, which returned to action on 4 May and again attacked targets in the Sakishima Islands. Its aircraft continued to do so until they flew their last missions of Operation Iceberg on 25 May. Statistics compiled by the BPF staff showed that 61 Seafires were lost or damaged beyond repair during both phases of the operation due to deck-landing accidents.

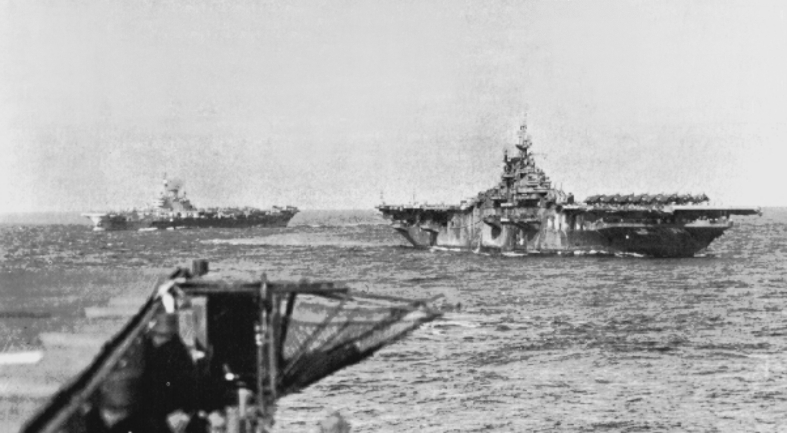
The American carrier Randolph (right) and Indefatigable (left) off the Japanese coast, 30 August 1945

The BPF arrived back at Sydney on 5 June and sailed for Manus three weeks later. Indefatigable was forced to remain behind as she required repairs to her machinery. Her air group flew aboard on 7 July (1772 Squadron and its Fireflies replacing 1770 Squadron) when she sailed for Manus. She reached the coast of Japan on 20 July and her aircraft began attacking targets near Osaka and in the Inland Sea four days later. Her Seafire squadrons had adapted larger external fuel tanks for their aircraft and they were no longer limited to CAP duty. The BPF's aircraft crippled the escort carrier Kaiyo and sank numerous smaller ships on 24 July. After replenishing, airstrikes resumed on 28 and 30 July, the British sinking the escort Okinawa near Maizuru. A combination of bad weather, refuelling requirements and the atomic bombing of Hiroshima delayed the resumption of air operations until 9 August. During the day, Indefatigable's aircraft attacked targets in northern Honshu and southern Hokkaido. The attacks were repeated the next day, sinking two warships and numerous small merchantmen and destroying numerous railroad locomotives and parked aircraft.

The BPF had been scheduled to withdraw after 10 August to prepare for Operation Olympic, the invasion of Kyushu scheduled for November, and the bulk of the force departed for Manus on 12 August. Indefatigable, however, had been chosen to remain as part of the Allied occupation force. The next day her aircraft attacked targets in the vicinity of Tokyo. Flight operations resumed on the morning of the 15th after an operational pause to refuel. The first airstrike was tasked to attack Kisarazu Air Field with four Fireflies and six Avengers, escorted by eight Seafires, but was forced to divert to its secondary target because of bad weather. En route they were attacked by a dozen Zeros in the last British air combat of the war. The Japanese fighters shot down one Seafire on their first pass and crippled an Avenger. The Seafires claimed four Zeros shot down, four others probably shot down, and another four damaged. An Avenger also claimed one Zero as damaged. A Yokosuka D4Y "Judy" dive bomber attacked the carrier after the ceasefire went into effect, but its two bombs missed. After the ceasefire, Indefatigable's aircraft continued to fly CAP and flew reconnaissance missions looking for Allied prisoners of war, dropping supplies to them as they were located.

=== Post-war service ===
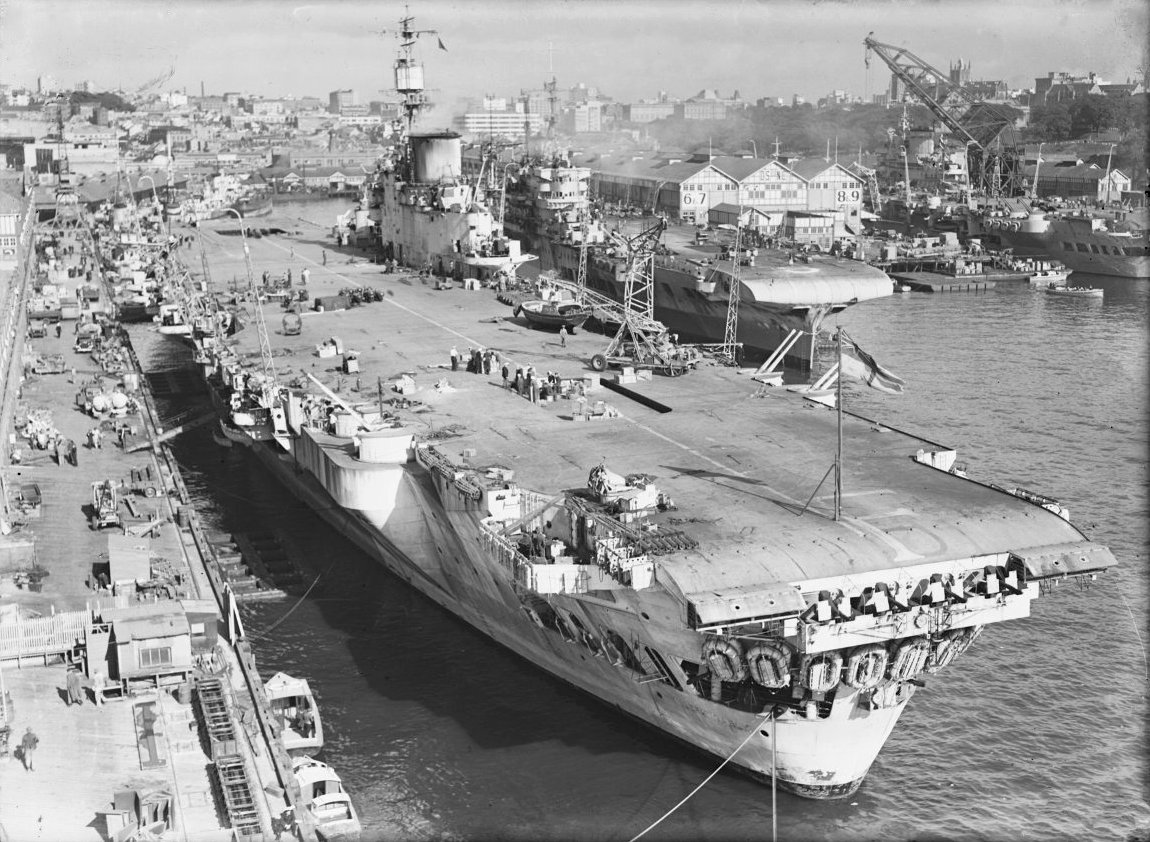
Indefatigable refitting at Woolloomooloo, Sydney, 1945

On 17 August 1945, Admiral Sir Bruce Fraser, commander of the BPF, came aboard and addressed the crew. Indefatigable continued flying operations until she entered Sagami Bay on 5 September. She departed three days later for Manus en route to Sydney. The ship arrived at Sydney on 18 September and began a leisurely refit that lasted until 15 November. On 1 November, Captain Ian MacIntyre relieved Graham as captain of the ship. She became Vian's flagship on 22 November and sailed to New Zealand to show the flag. She arrived in Wellington on 27 November and was opened for public tours, during which time the Prime Minister, Peter Fraser, also visited. Indefatigable then sailed to Auckland, arriving on 12 December, and was again opened for tours. She returned to Sydney for the holidays and visited Melbourne on 22 January 1946 before departing for home nine days later. Vian transferred his flag to her sister ship Implacable that day and the ship stopped off at Fremantle and Cape Town en route. While Indefatigable was visiting the latter city, she was opened to the public, and the Governor-General of South Africa toured the ship.

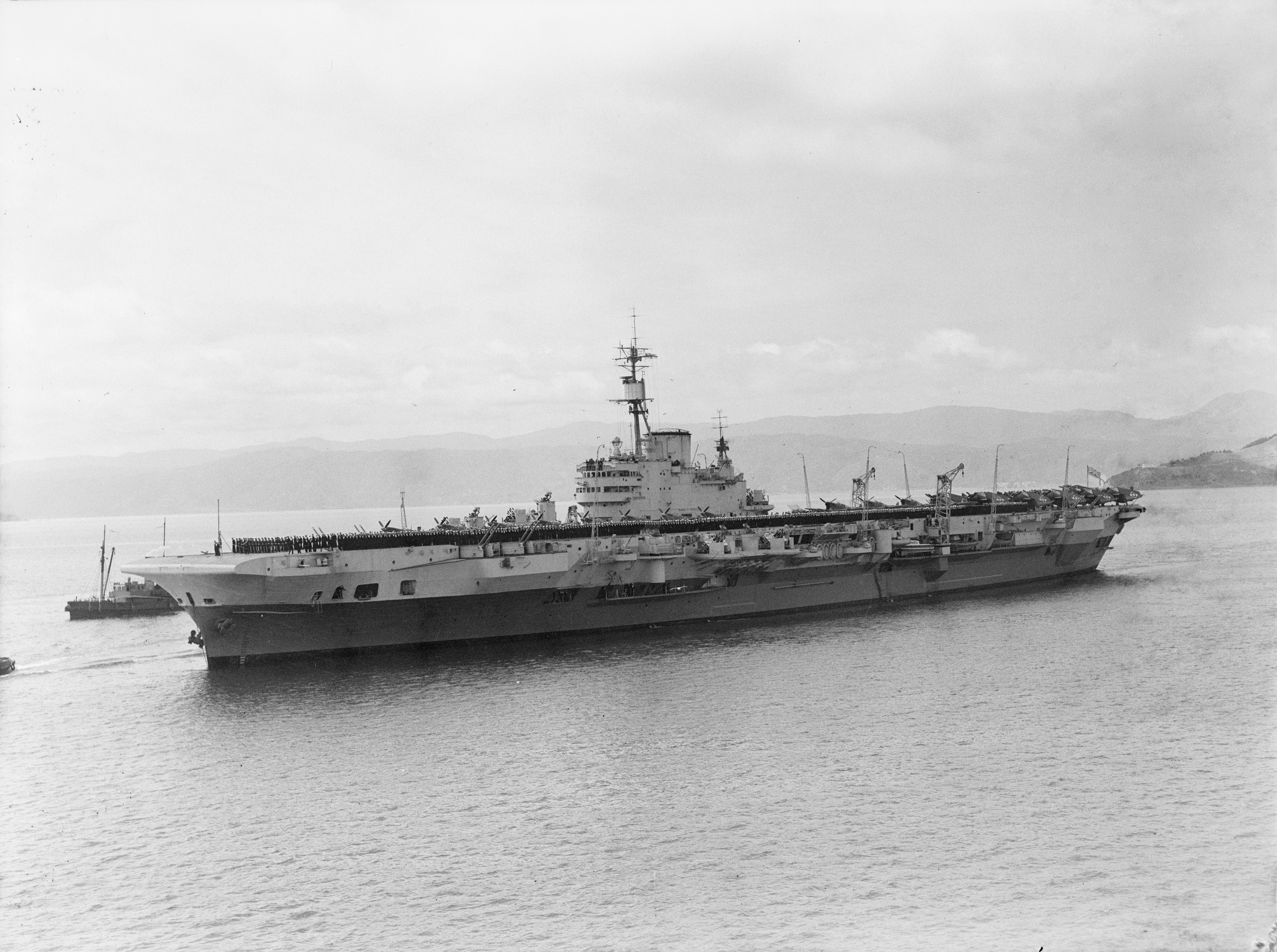
Indefatigable in Wellington Harbour during November 1945

The carrier arrived at Portsmouth Dockyard on 16 March 1946. Her hangars were modified to accommodate over 1,900 passengers, including women, and she departed for Australia on 25 April carrying 782 RN personnel and 130 Australian war brides. Most of the RN personnel disembarked at Colombo and most of the war brides did the same at Fremantle. Indefatigable continued on to Sydney, where she embarked a complete naval hospital, with patients, and over 1,000 RN officers and ratings. She departed on 9 June and arrived at Plymouth on 7 July. Her next voyage involved transporting a much smaller number of men to Malta and Colombo; only 47 officers and 67 ratings, most of whom left the ship at Malta. When she arrived at Colombo on 15 August, she loaded a full complement of passengers from all three services to return to the UK. The ship arrived at Portsmouth on 9 September and her next voyage involved over 1,200 RN personnel and civilians ferried to Malta, Colombo, and Singapore where almost 1,300 personnel embarked. She returned to Portsmouth on 29 October and began a brief refit in preparation for her final trooping voyage. Indefatigable sailed empty for Norfolk, Virginia, where she loaded RN personnel before returning to Portsmouth on 21 November. The next month, she was placed in reserve and Captain MacIntyre retired on 7 January 1947.

The Admiralty decided to recommission Indefatigable for use as a training ship in mid-1949. Captain Henry Fancourt assumed command on 22 August to prepare for sea. The ship arrived at Devonport to begin the necessary modifications on 30 August and the following day Fancourt turned over command to the dockyard. Captain John Grindle was appointed to command on 24 March 1950 and the ship was recommissioned on 28 May. Two days later Captain Robert Sherbrooke, VC, relieved Grindle and Indefatigable began her sea trials on 28 June. She was inspected by Rear Admiral St John Micklethwaithe, Flag Officer Training Squadron, on 3 July and received her first trainees shortly afterwards. She participated in exercises with the Home Fleet and joined it in Gibraltar in September and October. On 12 March 1951 she sortied from Portland, flying Micklethwaite's flag, to exercise with the Home Fleet before beginning a brief refit at Devonport in May. Captain John Grant relieved Sherbrooke on 6 June and the ship was opened to visitors as part of the Festival of Britain on 17 July. Five days later the visitors were stranded aboard ship overnight when a storm came up and forced Indefatigable to put to sea. The seas moderated the next day and the visitors departed in safety. Rear Admiral Royer Dick hoisted his flag aboard the carrier in September until she began a short refit at Devonport in January 1952.

Indefatigable joined Implacable for her annual winter visit to Gibraltar after completing her refit in February 1952. Over the summer she exercised with the Home Fleet and visited the Danish port of Aarhus, where she was visited by Queen Alexandrine of Denmark in July. Captain Ralph Fisher assumed command on 30 January 1953 and took her to sea three weeks later for exercises with the Home Fleet and her annual visit to Gibraltar. She returned to Portland in late March and visited Bournemouth at the end of May. She joined her sister and several other carriers on 9 June to sail for Spithead for the Coronation Fleet Review of Queen Elizabeth II on 15 June as one of a fleet of nine carriers. Indefatigable joined her sister for fleet exercises off the Scilly Isles and in the Bristol Channel in September and October before beginning her annual refit on 6 October. The Admiralty announced on 26 January 1954 that both ships would be replaced as training ships and reduced to reserve. This had no short-term impact on their activities as they sailed for the Western Mediterranean on their annual winter cruise. The ship exercised with the Home Fleet and made a port visit to Casablanca, Morocco, before visiting Gibraltar. Captain Hugh Browne assumed command on 10 May after Fisher had been promoted. The ship welcomed home Queen Elizabeth II and her husband four days later as they returned from their tour of the Commonwealth. The following month, Indefatigable exercised with the Home Fleet in Scottish waters and visited Aarhus again. In August she began transferring her training duties to the carrier Ocean and arrived at Rosyth on 2 September to be paid off, a process that took until the following month to complete. She was towed to Gareloch in June 1955 where she was listed for disposal. Indefatigable was sold for scrap in September 1956 and arrived at Dalmuir on 4 November 1956 to be stripped by Arnott Young, and the hulk subsequently towed to Troon for final breaking up, being beached there on 1 September 1957, with cutting-up complete on 15 April 1959.

== Squadrons embarked ==
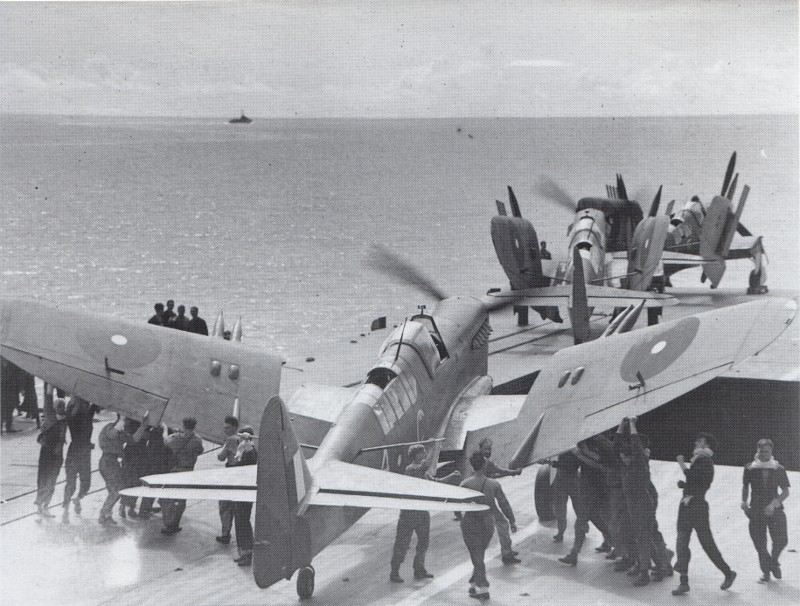
Folding the wing of a Fairey Firefly, 4 January 1945, after the attack on Pangkalan Brandan, Sumatra

| Squadron | Aircraft operated | Embarked (from – to) | Notes |
|---|---|---|---|
| 820 | Fairey Barracuda II; Grumman TBF Avenger | 10 July 1944 – March 1946 | – |
| 826 | Fairey Barracuda II | 10 June – 7 August 1944; 17–26 September 1944 | – |
| 887 | Supermarine Seafire III | 6 July – 24 September 1944; 21 November 1944 – 15 March 1946 | – |
| 888 | Grumman F6F Hellcat | 24 December 1944 – 7 January 1945 | Photoreconnaissance versions |
| 894 | Supermarine Seafire III | 24 July – 24 September 1944; 21 November 1944 – 15 March 1946 | – |
| 1770 | Fairey Firefly I | 18 May – 25 July 1944; 7 August 1944 – 5 June 1945 | Disbanded |
| 1772 | Fairey Firefly I | 7 July 1945 – 10 March 1946 | Disbanded |
| 1840 | Grumman F6F Hellcat | 7 August – 1 September 1944 | – |

== Bibliography ==
- Brown, David (1977). WWII Fact Files: Aircraft Carriers. New York: Arco Publishing. ISBN 0-668-04164-1.
- Brown, David K. (2006). Nelson to Vanguard: Warship Design and Development 1923–1945. London: Chatham Publishing. ISBN 1-59114-602-X.
- Brown, J. D. (2009). Carrier Operations in World War II. Annapolis, Maryland: Naval Institute Press. ISBN 978-1-59114-108-2.
- Campbell, John (1985). Naval Weapons of World War II. Annapolis, Maryland: Naval Institute Press. ISBN 0-87021-459-4.
- Chesneau, Roger (1995). Aircraft Carriers of the World, 1914 to the Present: An Illustrated Encyclopedia (New, Revised ed.). Annapolis, Maryland: Naval Institute Press. ISBN 0-87021-902-2.
- Chesneau, Roger, ed. (1980). Conway's All the World's Fighting Ships 1922–1946. Greenwich, UK: Conway Maritime Press. ISBN 0-85177-146-7.
- Friedman, Norman (1988). British Carrier Aviation: The Evolution of the Ships and Their Aircraft. Annapolis, Maryland: Naval Institute Press. ISBN 0-87021-054-8.
- Garzke, William H. & Dulin, Robert O. (1985). Battleships: Axis and Neutral Battleships in World War II. Annapolis, Maryland: Naval Institute Press. ISBN 978-0-87021-101-0.
- Hobbs, David (2013). British Aircraft Carriers: Design, Development and Service Histories. Barnsley, UK: Seaforth Publishing. ISBN 978-1-84832-138-0.
- Hobbs, David (2011). The British Pacific Fleet: The Royal Navy's Most Powerful Strike Force. Annapolis, Maryland: Naval Institute Press. ISBN 978-1-59114-044-3.
- Holt, Thadeus (2007). The Deceivers: Allied Military Deception in the Second World War. New York: Skyhorse Publishing. ISBN 978-1-60239-142-0.
- Howe, Stuart (1992). De Havilland Mosquito: An Illustrated History. Bourne End, UK: Aston Publications. ISBN 0-946627-63-0.
- Lenton, H. T. (1998). British & Empire Warships of the Second World War. Annapolis, Maryland: Naval Institute Press. ISBN 1-55750-048-7.
- McCart, Neil (2000). The Illustrious & Implacable Classes of Aircraft Carrier 1940–1969. Cheltenham, UK: Fan Publications. ISBN 1-901225-04-6.
- Polmar, Norman & Genda, Minoru (2007). Aircraft Carriers: A History of Carrier Aviation and Its Influence on World Events, Volume II: 1946-2006. Dulles, Virginia: Potomac Books. ISBN 978-1-57488-665-8.
- Rohwer, Jürgen (2005). Chronology of the War at Sea 1939–1945: The Naval History of World War Two (Third Revised ed.). Annapolis, Maryland: Naval Institute Press. ISBN 1-59114-119-2.
- Sturtivant, Ray (1984). The Squadrons of the Fleet Air Arm. Tonbridge, Kent, UK: Air-Britain (Historians). ISBN 0-85130-120-7.
- Sturtivant, Ray (1990). British Naval Aviation the Fleet Air Arm, 1917–1990. London: Arms and Armour Press. ISBN 0-85368-938-5.
- Thomas, Andrew (27 March 2007). Royal Navy Aces of World War 2. London: Osprey. ISBN 978-1-84603-178-6.
- My Grandparents War "Carey Mulligan" -wild Pictures Limited production for Channel 4 Television in association with WNET. 2019 December 18
