= Operation Mascot =

1944 British carrier air raid against the German battleship Tirpitz

Coordinates: 69.9353°N 23.0454°E

- Part of World War II
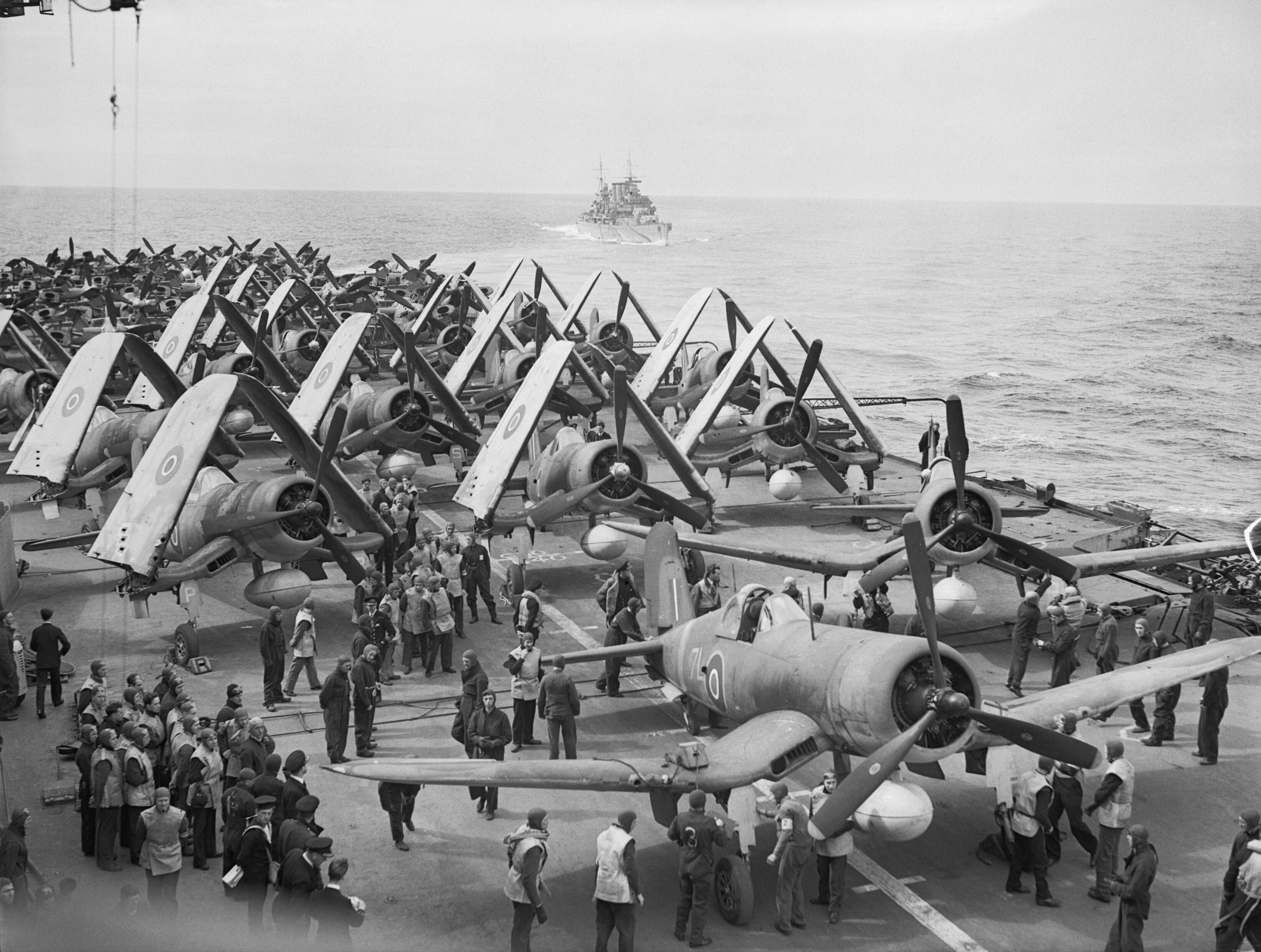
- Corsair fighters and Barracuda bombers ranged on the flight deck of HMS Formidable during operations off Norway in July 1944
Date	17 July 1944
Location	Kåfjord, Norway
Result	German victory

Belligerents
United Kingdom	Germany

Commanders and leaders
(United Kingdom) Henry Moore	(Nazi Germany) Wolf Junge

Strength
44 dive bombers 40 fighters	One battleship Anti-aircraft batteries and ships

Casualties and losses
Three aircraft	One patrol craft 2 U-boats sunk

Operation Mascot was an unsuccessful British carrier air raid conducted against the German battleship Tirpitz at her anchorage in Kaafjord, Norway, on 17 July 1944. The attack was one of a series of strikes against the battleship launched from aircraft carriers between April and August 1944, and was initiated after Allied intelligence determined that the damage inflicted during the Operation Tungsten raid on 3 April had been repaired.

A force of 44 British dive bombers and 40 fighters took off from three aircraft carriers in the early hours of 17 July. German radar stations detected these aircraft while they were en route to Kaafjord, and Tirpitz was protected by a smoke screen by the time the strike force arrived. Few of the British airmen were able to spot the battleship, and their attacks did not inflict any significant damage. German losses were limited to a patrol craft, and three British aircraft were destroyed or damaged beyond repair by Kaafjord's defenders. A group of German submarines attempted to intercept the carrier force as it returned to base, without success. Two U-boats were sunk near the carriers by British patrol aircraft and several others were damaged.

In August 1944, the Royal Navy conducted Operation Goodwood, four more carrier raids against Tirpitz which also failed and the task of sinking the battleship was transferred to the Royal Air Force.

== Background ==
From early 1942 Tirpitz posed a significant threat to the Allied convoys transporting supplies through the Norwegian Sea to the Soviet Union. Operating from fjords on the Norwegian coast, the battleship was capable of overwhelming the close-escort forces assigned to the Arctic convoys or breaking out into the North Atlantic. To counter this threat, the Allies were forced to keep a powerful force of warships with the British Home Fleet, and capital ships accompanied most convoys part of the way to the Soviet Union.

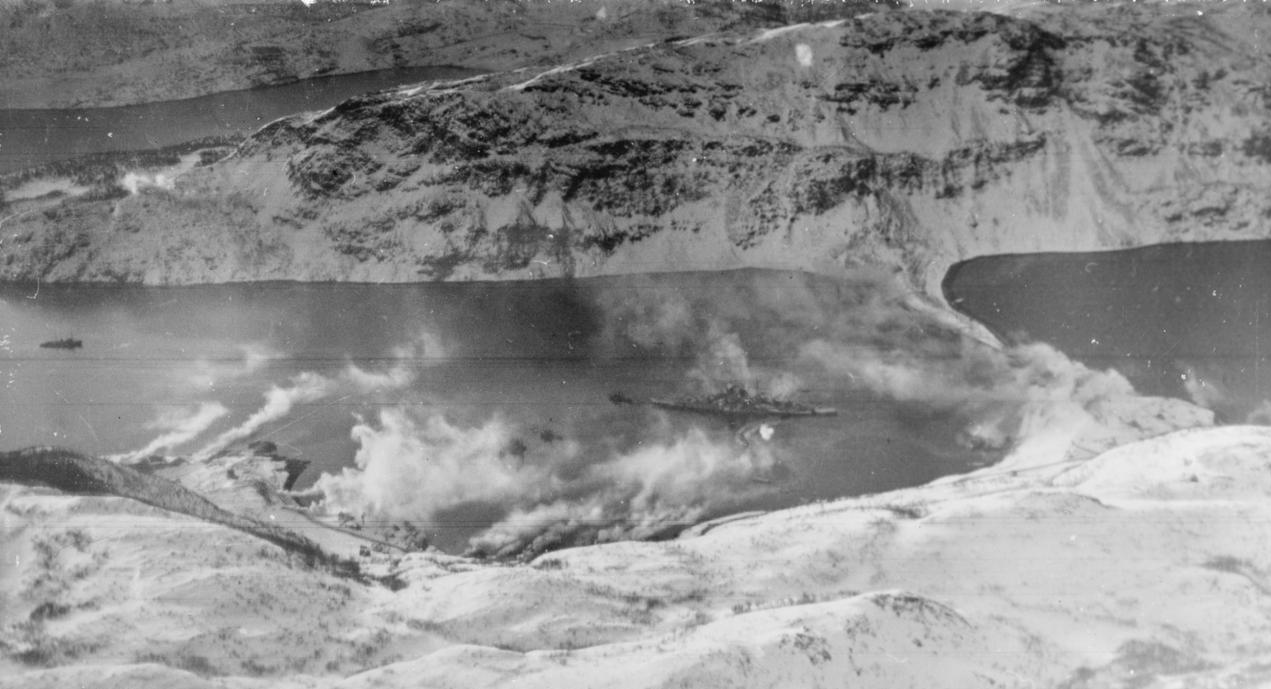
A British aerial reconnaissance photograph of Tirpitz moored at Kaafjord. The artificial smoke generators on the shores of the fjord have not yet obscured her.

Several air and naval attacks were launched against Tirpitz in 1942 and 1943. On 6 March 1942, torpedo bombers flying from the aircraft carrier HMS Victorious attacked the battleship while she was attempting to intercept Convoy PQ 12 but did not achieve any hits. Land-based bombers from the Royal Air Force (RAF) and Soviet Air Forces also attempted to strike Tirpitz in her anchorages on several occasions in 1942 and 1943, but did not inflict any damage. On 23 September 1943, two British X-class midget submarines penetrated defences around the battleship at her main anchorage at Kaafjord in northern Norway during Operation Source, and placed explosive charges in the water beneath her. This attack caused extensive damage to Tirpitz, putting her out of service for six months.

As Tirpitz was still considered a major threat to Allied shipping, the British military sought to damage or destroy the battleship before she could re-enter service. Another midget submarine attack was considered impractical due to improvements to Kaafjord's defences, and the commander of the RAF's Bomber Command refused to attempt heavy bomber raids against the battleship as he believed that such operations were unlikely to be successful and would result in heavy casualties. As a result, the Home Fleet's aircraft carriers were considered the best means of attacking Kaafjord, and the Admiralty directed the fleet to begin planning such a raid in late 1943. Following several months of preparations the Home Fleet's first attack on Kaafjord, which was designated Operation Tungsten, was conducted on 3 April 1944 and involved five aircraft carriers. The two strike forces of 20 Fairey Barracuda dive bombers escorted by 40 fighters were not detected during their flights to Kaafjord, and the battleship was hit by 15 bombs. Tirpitz's crew suffered heavy casualties, but the ship was not badly damaged. Nevertheless, the damage inflicted on Tirpitz's superstructure, armament and engines was sufficient to put her out of service for several months while repairs were completed. The commander of Nazi Germany's Kriegsmarine, Grand Admiral Karl Dönitz, placed a priority on returning the battleship to service so that she could continue to tie down Allied naval resources. He and other senior German officers recognised at this time that the threat of further air attacks meant that Tirpitz could no longer operate against Allied convoys.

British intelligence assessed that Tirpitz could be repaired within six months, and the Admiralty ordered further carrier-borne strikes against the battleship. First Sea Lord Andrew Cunningham did not believe that Barracudas could carry weapons capable of sinking Tirpitz, but he hoped that further attacks would increase the period the battleship was out of service and harm her crew's morale. The commander of the Home Fleet, Vice Admiral Bruce Fraser, initially resisted this order on the grounds that further carrier raids on Kaafjord were unlikely to be successful as Tirpitz's defences would have been reinforced and weather conditions were likely to be worse than those encountered during Operation Tungsten. Following an argument with Cunningham, Fraser eventually agreed to attack Kaafjord again. Despite the decision to make further attacks on Kaafjord, many of the Home Fleet's airmen were posted to other units following Operation Tungsten. This hindered subsequent operations against German forces in Norway as the new aircrew were less experienced than the men they replaced.

Three raids against Tirpitz were cancelled after launch due to unfavourable weather during April and May 1944. The first of these attacks, Operation Planet, began when the Home Fleet sailed from its base at Scapa Flow in the Orkney Islands on 21 April. This operation involved the same aircraft carriers as had taken part in Operation Tungsten, aside from the substitution of the escort carrier HMS Fencer with her sister ship Striker. The fleet reached the position where its aircraft were to be flown off three days later, but the raid was cancelled when Allied agents near Kaafjord reported bad weather over the target area. The fleet then sailed south, and attacked a German convoy near Bodø, sinking three merchant ships for the loss of six aircraft. The Home Fleet put to sea to attack Tirpitz again in mid-May in what was designated Operation Brawn. A strike force of 27 Barracudas escorted by Vought F4U Corsair and Supermarine Seafire fighters took off from the carriers HMS Furious and Victorious on the afternoon of 15 May, but encountered heavy cloud over Kaafjord and returned without attacking. The next raid, Operation Tiger Claw, was launched in late May. The planned attack on Kaafjord—which would have also involved aircraft flying from Furious and Victorious—had to be cancelled due to bad weather on 28 May. Instead, the carriers sailed south in search of German convoys. In a raid conducted on 1 June, the carriers' aircraft sank four merchant vessels near Ålesund. No further attacks were attempted during June as the ships of the Home Fleet were needed to support the Normandy landings that month.

== Preparations ==
The location of Kaafjord in northern Norway

Despite the lack of success, the Admiralty and Admiral Sir Henry Moore, who had assumed command of the Home Fleet on 14 June 1944, remained committed to attempting further carrier raids against Tirpitz. During June, the Admiralty received a series of intelligence reports indicating that repairs to Tirpitz were generally progressing well and the battleship would soon be ready to put to sea. Late that month Allied spies spotted Tirpitz conducting steaming trials in Kaafjord, and reported that she was capable of sailing at up to 20 knots (37 km/h) and could rotate her main gun turrets. As a result, in late June the Admiralty directed that another aircraft carrier raid be conducted against Kaafjord during mid-July. It was intended that this attack would take place before the resumption of the Arctic convoys, which had been suspended since April 1944 to free up ships for the invasion of France.

As detected by the British, repairs to Tirpitz following Operation Tungsten progressed quickly. Work on repairing the battleship began in late April, and 157 shipyard workers and special equipment were transported from Kiel in Germany to Kaafjord to accelerate the project. Assisted by the long hours of daylight at Kaafjord's latitude during summer, three shifts of personnel worked on Tirpitz each day. The battleship was capable of moving under her own power by 2 June, and ready to begin gunnery exercises at the end of that month. The repair works concluded in mid-July, though the battleship's starboard propeller shaft could only be used to drive her forwards. Captain Wolf Junge assumed command of the battleship in May 1944, replacing Captain Hans Meyer who had been wounded during Operation Tungsten.

== Opposing forces ==
As Victorious had been redeployed to the Indian Ocean in June, the carriers selected for Operation Mascot were the recently commissioned HMS Indefatigable as well as the veterans Formidable and Furious. The carriers were escorted by the battleship HMS Duke of York, four cruisers and twelve destroyers. Admiral Moore commanded the force from Duke of York, and the carrier group was led by Rear Admiral Rhoderick McGrigor on board Indefatigable.

The composition of the striking force was broadly similar to that used in the earlier operations targeting Tirpitz. Formidable embarked No. 8 Torpedo Bomber Reconnaissance Wing, whose 827 and 830 Naval Air Squadrons each operated 12 Barracudas, as well as 1841 Naval Air Squadron, which was equipped with 18 Corsairs. Indefatigable carried No. 9 Torpedo Bomber Reconnaissance Wing, which was also equipped with 24 Barracudas split between 820 and 826 Naval Air Squadrons, as well as the Seafire-equipped 894 Naval Air Squadron and 1770 Naval Air Squadron's 12 Fairey Firefly fighters. In a change from her role in the previous attacks, Furious did not embark any Barracudas during Operation Mascot, and instead operated 20 Grumman F6F Hellcat fighters from 1840 Naval Air Squadron, three Seafires assigned to 880 Naval Air Squadron and three 842 Flight Fairey Swordfish anti-submarine aircraft.

The defences of Kaafjord were improved following Operation Tungsten. Prior to this raid they had comprised eleven batteries of anti-aircraft guns, several anti-aircraft warships and a system of smoke generators capable of hiding Tirpitz from aircraft. After the attack, additional radar stations and observation posts were established and the number of smoke generators located around the battleship was increased. The improved defences in place by the time of Operation Mascot included a cliff-top observation post near Kaafjord, which was capable of directing the battleship's anti-aircraft guns if necessary. Tirpitz's air defences were also strengthened during the period she was under repair by fitting additional 20-millimetre (0.79 in) cannons, modifying the 150 mm guns so they could be used to attack aircraft, and supplying anti-aircraft shells for her 380-millimetre (15 in) main guns.

As well as the German forces located near Kaafjord, a patrol line of twelve submarines designated Group Trutz was also established around the island of Jan Mayen and assigned the task of intercepting any British carrier forces that ventured into the Norwegian Sea. The submarines assigned to this force at the time of Operation Mascot were U-347, U-361, U-365, U-387, U-636, U-716, U-742, U-921, U-956, U-965, U-992, and U-995. The German Luftwaffe (air force) had few fighters stationed at bases near Kaafjord, and their operations were constrained by a lack of fuel.

== Attack ==
Rear Admiral McGrigor issued an operational memo to the air units selected for Operation Mascot on 4 July, outlining how the attack would be conducted and providing further orders for the raid eight days later. In accordance with these instructions, the flying squadrons assigned to the three carriers undertook training exercises from their ships and shore bases from 4 July onwards. Intelligence gained from decrypting German radio messages during early July, and photos taken by a RAF aircraft on 12 July, provided further evidence that the battleship was once again fully operational and possibly preparing to put to sea. The airmen were informed on 13 July that they would attack Kaafjord in four days time.

The British fleet left Scapa Flow as a single group on 14 July. During the voyage north, the airmen received detailed briefings on the attack plans and terrain around Kaafjord and were also issued with escape kits to use if they were shot down over Norway. Maintenance personnel also worked to ensure that as many aircraft as possible would be ready. The twelve German submarines in the Norwegian Sea did not make contact with the British force as it sailed north. The weather for much of the voyage was foggy, but the skies were clear when the fleet reached its flying off position to the north of Kaafjord in the evening of 16 July.

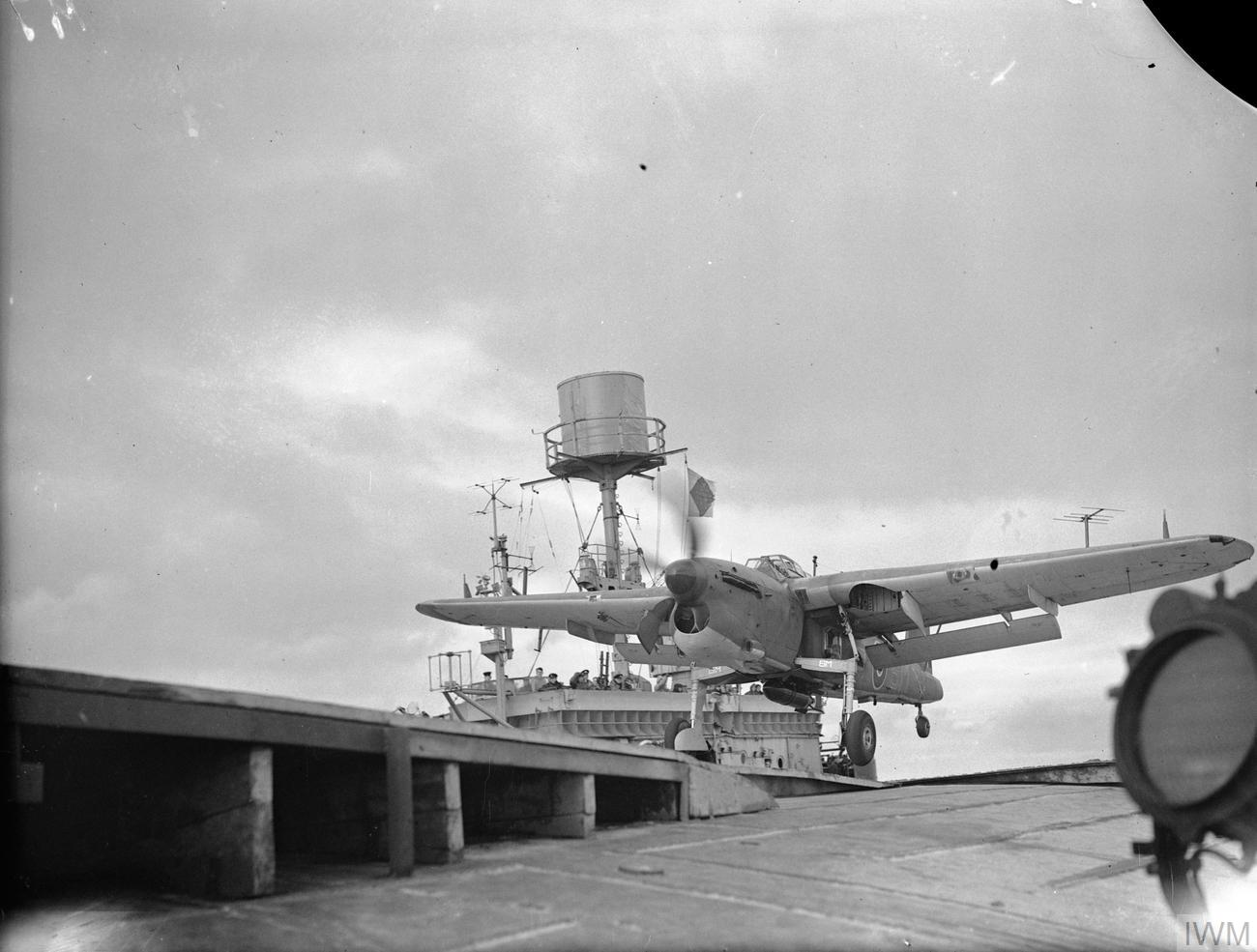
An 830 Naval Air Squadron Barracuda taking off from the temporary ski jump on Furious at the start of Operation Mascot

The carriers began launching their aircraft shortly after midnight on 17 July. The main striking force comprised 44 Barracudas, with the plan for the raid specifying that No. 8 Torpedo Bomber Reconnaissance Wing's aircraft would attack before those of No. 9 Torpedo Bomber Reconnaissance Wing. All but two of the dive bombers were armed with powerful 1,600-pound (730 kg) armour-piercing bombs; the other aircraft each carried three 500-pound (230 kg) bombs. 1841 Naval Air Squadron's 18 Corsairs were assigned to provide protection against German fighters, and the 20 Hellcats and 12 Fireflies operated by 1840 and 1770 Naval Air Squadrons respectively were given the task of suppressing anti-aircraft guns.

After forming up, the bombers and fighters began their flight to Kaafjord at 01:35. The aircraft flew 50 feet (15 m) above the sea to evade German radar until they reached a point ten minutes flying time from the Norwegian coast, at which time the Barracudas climbed to 9,000 feet (2,700 m) and the fighters to higher altitudes. The weather was fine throughout the flight, but clouds were sighted as the aircraft neared the target area.

The British strike force was detected by German radar stations when it reached a point 43 miles (69 km) from Kaafjord at 02:00. It took four minutes to pass a warning to Tirpitz; her protective smoke generators were in action by 02:13 and quickly covered the vessel in an artificial cloud. The battleship and anti-aircraft batteries located on the shore began firing a barrage towards the British aircraft at 02:19. German forces also began jamming the British aircraft's radios once they came within 10 miles (16 km) of the Norwegian coastline. The smokescreen frustrated the British attack, as the crews of only two of the Barracudas and a pair of fighters managed to spot Tirpitz during the raid.

The Hellcats and Fireflies were first to attack, and strafed anti-aircraft positions as well as the destroyer Z33 and small patrol craft Vp 6307. The patrol craft was forced aground and later declared a total loss. Due to the thick smoke, the fighter pilots were only able to locate targets by aiming at the sources of tracer gunfire.

The Barracudas were targeted by heavy, but inaccurate, anti-aircraft gunfire as they arrived over Kaafjord. Aside from the two aircraft whose pilots sighted Tirpitz, the 35 other dive bombers attempting to attack the ship were forced to aim at her gun flashes. These bombing attacks took 25 minutes to complete; seven near misses were achieved but no damage was inflicted on Tirpitz. One of the other Barracudas attacked an anti-aircraft battery, another attempted to bomb a destroyer and a third scored a near miss on the tanker Nordmark. Three of the remaining four Barracudas did not find any targets and jettisoned their bombs into the sea; the fourth was unable to drop its bombs due to a faulty release mechanism.

Although German gunners fired a heavy anti-aircraft barrage throughout the attack, they achieved little success. Only one British aircraft, a Corsair, was shot down near Kaafjord; its pilot, Lieutenant R. E. Dubber, survived and was taken prisoner. A damaged Barracuda was also forced to ditch near Indefatigable and its crew were rescued by the destroyer HMS Verulam. Several other Barracudas and five Hellcats were damaged during the raid and returned to their carriers. One of the damaged Hellcats was later written off after being judged beyond repair.

A second British raid, which had been scheduled to take off from 08:00 on 17 July, was cancelled two minutes before the aircraft were to begin launching when fog began to build up near the carriers, and the British fleet turned south to return to Scapa Flow. Swordfish and Seafire aircraft flew protective patrols over the Home Fleet throughout the morning's operations.

== Submarine actions ==
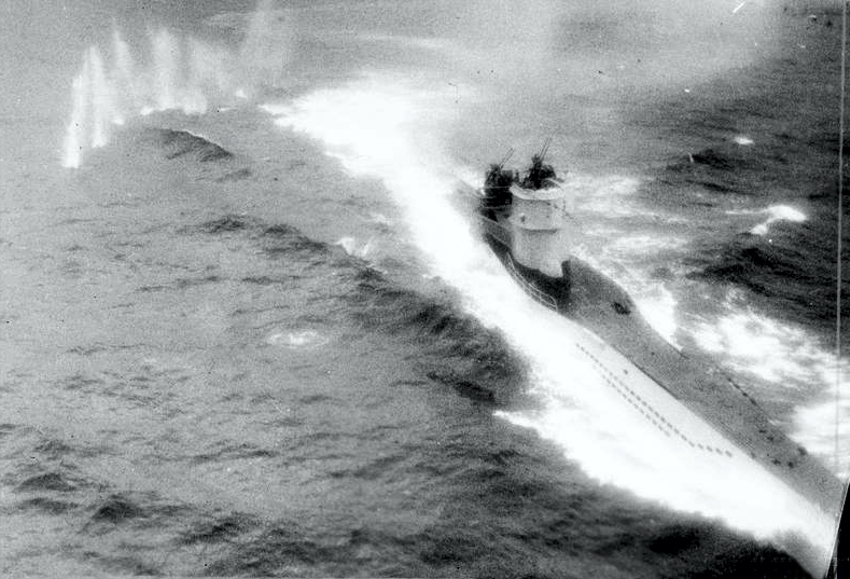
U-361 under attack on 17 July

While Kaafjord was under attack, the commander of the German submarines in the Norwegian sea ordered Group Trutz to take up new positions to the south-east of Jan Mayen and intercept the British ships as they returned to Scapa Flow. The Admiralty had anticipated this redeployment, and maritime patrol aircraft from No. 18 Group RAF were directed to sweep the Home Fleet's route back to its base.

The British patrol aircraft prevented Group Trutz from attacking the Home Fleet. At 21:48 on 17 July, a Consolidated B-24 Liberator assigned to No. 86 Squadron detected and sank U-361; none of the submarine's crew were rescued. Eight minutes later a Consolidated Catalina flying boat of No. 210 Squadron piloted by Flying Officer John Cruickshank spotted U-347 on the surface. The submarine's anti-aircraft guns damaged the Catalina, killing the navigator and wounding Cruickshank as well as three other crewmen, but the pilot continued his attack and sank U-347 with depth charges. The Catalina managed to return to base, and Cruickshank was awarded the Victoria Cross for this action. That night the Home Fleet sailed through the gap in the German patrol line that had been opened by the sinking of the two submarines.

Attacks on the German submarines continued for the next six days. On the morning of 18 July a German reconnaissance aircraft spotted the Home Fleet, but German Naval Command Norway assessed that it was heading north-east to launch another attack. Accordingly, Group Trutz was ordered to sail north, and four more submarines sortied from Narvik to guard the approaches to Alten and Vest fjords. In the evening U-968, one of the four boats that had sailed from Narvik, was attacked twice by Liberators; she shot down the first attacker but was damaged by the second and had to return to port. U-716 also suffered severe damage from a Liberator attack at 19:15 on 18 July but managed to return to Hammerfest. At about 23:00 that day U-716 was seriously damaged by a Short Sunderland but also survived. Three other submarines were attacked on 20 July but only one suffered any damage. Following these actions the commander of submarines in the Norway area decided to dissolve Group Trutz as it was too vulnerable to air attack; all but four of the surviving submarines returned to port and the remaining boats were ordered to sail north so that they were out of range of the British aircraft. The final attack on the submarines of the former Group Trutz was made on 23 July when a No. 330 Squadron Sunderland damaged U-992 near Vestfjord.

== Aftermath ==
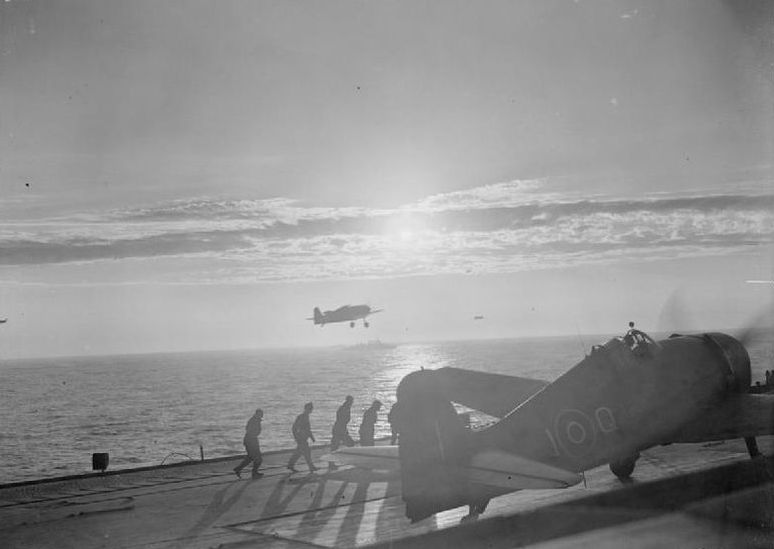
Hellcats returning to HMS Furious following Operation Mascot

Following the attack on 17 July, the British learned from intercepted German radio transmissions and reports provided by Secret Intelligence Service agents that Tirpitz had not suffered any significant damage. Admiral Moore blamed the failure of Operation Mascot on the inexperience of the aircrew involved in the attack, and criticised the strike leader for not selecting alternative targets after it became clear that Tirpitz could not be accurately bombed. Moore also judged that further attacks on Kaafjord using Barracudas would be futile, as the dive bombers' slow speed gave the Germans enough time to cover Tirpitz with smoke between the time raids were detected and their arrival over the target area. The Admiralty was hopeful that a strategy of repeatedly striking Kaafjord over a 48-hour period would wear down the defences, and Moore agreed to attempt another attack. Consideration was also given to flying fast and long-ranged de Havilland Mosquito bombers off the carriers in an attempt to achieve surprise, but none of these land-based aircraft could be spared from supporting the Allied bombing of Germany.

The next attack on Kaafjord took place in late August. During Operation Goodwood, aircraft flying from three fleet carriers and two escort carriers conducted four raids between 22 and 29 August. The attackers found Tirpitz covered in smoke on each occasion, and only managed to inflict light damage on the battleship. These unsuccessful attacks cost the British 17 aircraft and 40 airmen killed. The frigate HMS Bickerton was torpedoed and sunk by the submarine U-354 during the operation; the same submarine also inflicted heavy damage on the escort carrier Nabob before being destroyed by a British aircraft.

The Admiralty accepted that Barracudas were too slow to be effective against the Kaafjord area following the failure of Operation Goodwood. As a result, the task of attacking the battleship was transferred to RAF Bomber Command. The first heavy bomber raid against Kaafjord (Operation Paravane) was conducted on 15 September 1944, with the bombers flying from staging bases in northern Russia. This attack inflicted irreparable damage on Tirpitz, and she was transferred south to the Tromsø area to be used as an immobile coastal defence battery. The battleship was sunk there with heavy loss of life by another Bomber Command raid on 12 November.

John Cruickshank became the last surviving World War II Victoria Cross recipient. On 17 July 2024 a Catalina flew over his home in Aberdeen to mark the 80th anniversary of the action for which he received the medal. Wreaths were also laid at Lerwick in honour of his navigator, John Dixon, and Victoria Cross recipient David Hornell who had been awarded the medal posthumously for an action on 24 June 1944. Cruickshank died on 9 August 2025.
