= Kåfjorden (Alta) =

Fjord in Alta Municipality in Finnmark county, Norway

Kåfjorden (Norwegian); Njoammelgohppi (Northern Sami)
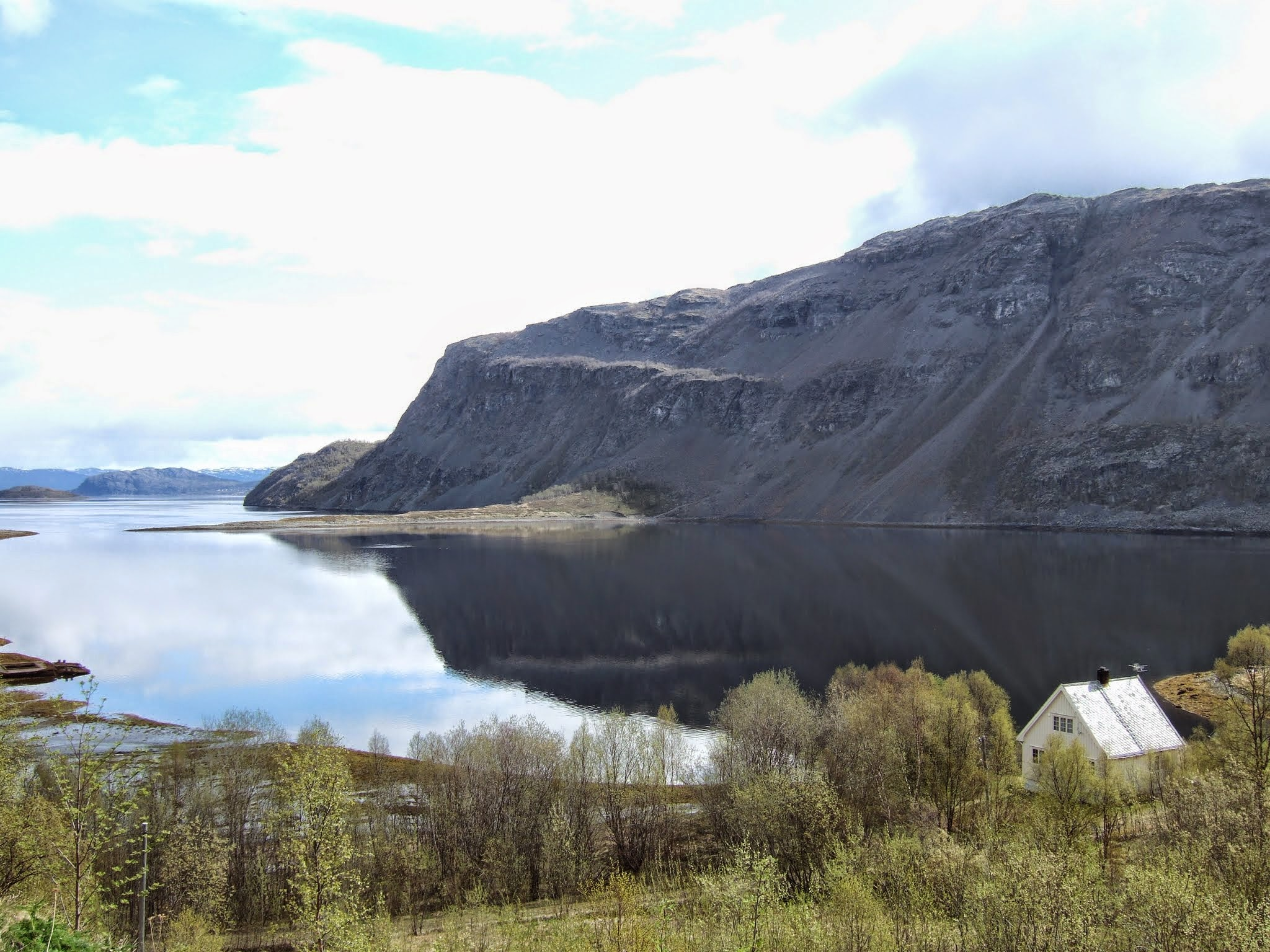
- View of the fjord
- Interactive map of the fjord
- Location: Finnmark county, Norway
- Coordinates: 69.9353°N 23.0454°E
- Type: Fjord
- Primary outflows: Altafjorden
- Basin countries: Norway
- Max. length: 8 kilometres (5.0 mi)

Kåfjorden (Norwegian) or Njoammelgohppi (Northern Sami) is a fjord in Alta Municipality in Finnmark county, Norway. The 8-kilometre (5.0 mi) long fjord branches off the main Altafjorden. The village of Kåfjord and the Kåfjord Church both lie along the northern coast of the fjord. The European route E06 highway follows the northern shoreline of the fjord. A bridge over Kåfjorden was built in 2013 to shorten the E6 highway route around the fjord.

The fjord was the anchorage of the German battleship Tirpitz for much of World War II, which was attacked by British midget submarines during Operation Source in 1943 and by aircraft during Operation Tungsten, Operation Mascot, Operation Goodwood and Operation Paravane in 1944.

== See also ==
- List of Norwegian fjords
