= 895 Naval Air Squadron =

Inactive flying squadron of the Royal Navy's Fleet Air Arm

- Squadron badge
- Active: 1942–1943; 1956
- Disbanded: 19 December 1956
- Country: United Kingdom
- Branch: Royal Navy
- Type: Single-seat fighter squadron
- Role: Carrier-based fighter squadron
- Part of: Fleet Air Arm
- Home station: See Naval air stations section for full list.
- Mottos: Sicut falco expeditus (Latin for 'Ready like the hawk')
- Engagements: Suez Crisis: Operation Musketeer

Commanders
- Notable commanders: Commander John Morris-Jones, MBE, RN

Insignia
- Squadron Badge Description: White, upon barry wavy of six blue and white two winged swords gold in saltire surmounted by a peregrine proper belled silver and perched on a cubit arm fesswise sleeved and gauntleted gold (1956)
- Identification Markings: 190-201 to 455-469 (Sea Hawk October 1956)
- Fin Carrier Codes: J:A:B to B (Sea Hawk October 1956)

Aircraft flown
- Fighter: Hawker Sea Hurricane; Supermarine Seafire; Hawker Sea Hawk

895 Naval Air Squadron (895 NAS), sometimes 895 Squadron, was a Fleet Air Arm (FAA) naval air squadron of the United Kingdom’s Royal Navy (RN). It was last active during 1956 where it flew Hawker Sea Hawk.

It was established at HMS Blackcap, RNAS Stretton, as a fighter squadron in November 1942. It started with Hawker Sea Hurricane, which were later replaced with Supermarine Seafire. The squadron was disbanded at RAF Turnhouse in June 1943, and provided fighter flights for 816 and 842 Naval Air Squadrons.

In April 1956, it reformed at HMS Goldcrest, RNAS Brawdy and in August embarked in HMS Bulwark. In November, it participated in the Suez campaign, primarily carrying out attacks on Egyptian airfields. The squadron disembarked at HMS Daedalus, RNAS Lee-on-Solent, in December and was disbanded.

== History ==
=== Single-seat fighter squadron (1942-1943) ===
895 Naval Air Squadron was formed at RNAS Stretton (HMS Blackcap), Cheshire, England, on 15 November 1942 as a single-seat fighter unit, initially equipped with six Hawker Sea Hurricane Mk IB fighter aircraft, a navalised version of the Hawker Hurricane. It was intended to be deployed on an escort carrier, however, the squadron transitioned to nine Supermarine Seafire F Mk.IIc fighter aircraft in March 1943, a navalised Supermarine Spitfire. It ultimately disbanded at RAF Turnhouse, Edinburgh, Scotland, on 30 June, serving as the foundation for the fighter flights of 816 and 842 Naval Air Squadrons.

=== Hawker Sea Hawk (1956) ===
On 23 April 1956, 895 Naval Air Squadron was reformed at RNAS Brawdy (HMS Goldcrest), Pembrokeshire, Wales, equipped with twelve Hawker Sea Hawk FGA 4 Fighter/Ground attack aircraft, which were later designated as FGA 6. The squadron embarked in the Centaur-class light aircraft carrier, HMS Bulwark in August. In October, 895 Naval Air Squadron exchanged its aircraft with 897 Naval Air Squadron, receiving twelve Hawker Sea Hawk FB 3, a fighter-bomber variant. Subsequently, in November, the squadron participated in the Suez campaign, primarily engaging in strafing and bombing operations against Egyptian airfields. By December, 895 Naval Air Squadron disembarked at RNAS Lee-on-Solent (HMS Daedalus), Hampshire, England and was subsequently disbanded.

== Aircraft operated ==
The squadron has operated a number of different aircraft types, including:

- Hawker Sea Hurricane Mk IB fighter aircraft (November 1942 - May 1943)
- Supermarine Seafire F Mk.IIc fighter aircraft (March - June 1943)
- Hawker Sea Hawk FGA.4 fighter/ground attack aircraft (April - September 1956)
- Hawker Sea Hawk FGA.6 fighter/ground attack aircraft (August - October 1956)
- Hawker Sea Hawk FB.3 fighter-bomber (October - December 1956)

== Naval air stations and aircraft carriers ==
895 Naval Air Squadron operated from a number of naval air stations of the Royal Navy and Royal Air Force stations in the UK and overseas, and also a Royal Navy fleet carrier:

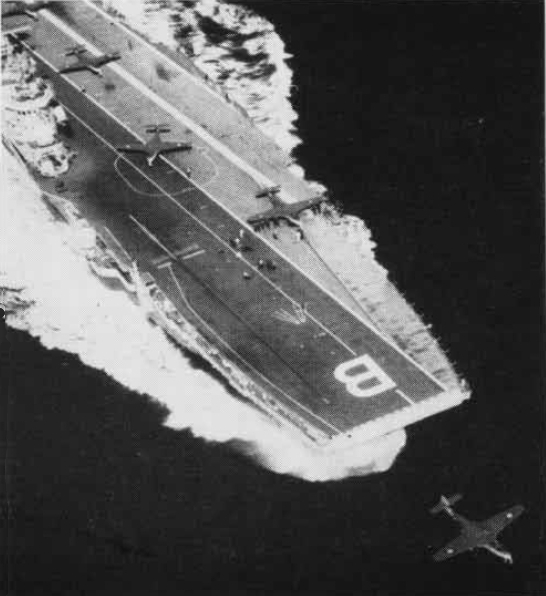
Hawker Sea Hawk launching from HMS Bulwark (R08) 1956

1942 - 1943

- Royal Naval Air Station Stretton (HMS Blackcap) (15 November - 31 December 1942)
- Royal Naval Air Station Charlton Horethorne (HMS Heron II) (31 December 1942 - 23 February 1943)
- Royal Naval Air Station Lee-on-Solent (HMS Daedalus) (23 February - 22 March 1943)
- Royal Naval Air Station St Merryn (HMS Vulture) (22 March - 3 May 1943)
- Royal Naval Air Station Machrihanish (HMS Landrail) (3 May - 15 June 1943)
- Royal Air Force Turnhouse (15 - 30 June 1943
- disbanded - (30 June 1943)

1956

- Royal Naval Air Station Brawdy (HMS Goldcrest) (23 April - 3 August 1956)
  - Royal Naval Air Station Lossiemouth (HMS Fulmar) (Detachment five aircraft 19 - 21 June 1956)
  - HMS Bulwark (Detachment five aircraft 21 June -2 July 1956)
- Royal Naval Air Station Ford (HMS Peregrine) (3 - 6 August 1956)
- HMS Bulwark (6 August - 17 December 1956)
  - RN Air Section Gibraltar (Detachment four aircraft 8 - 11 August 1956)
  - Royal Naval Air Station Hal Far (HMS Falcon) (Detachment four aircraft 24 August - 3 September 1956)
  - Royal Naval Air Station Hal Far (HMS Falcon) (Detachment six aircraft 14 - 25 September 1956)
  - RN Air Section Gibraltar (Detachment three aircraft 13 - 23 October 1956)
- Royal Naval Air Station Lee-on-Solent (HMS Daedalus) (17 - 19 December 1956)
- disbanded - (19 December 1956)

== Commanding officers ==
List of commanding officers of 895 Naval Air Squadron with date of appointment:

1942 - 1943

- Lieutenant Commander(A) J.W. Hedges, RNVR, from 15 November 1942
- disbanded - 30 June 1943

1956

- Lieutenant Commander J.M. Jones, RN, from 23 April 1956
- disbanded - 19 December 1956

Note: Abbreviation (A) signifies Air Branch of the RN or RNVR.

== Sources ==
- Ballance, Theo; Howard, Lee; Sturtivant, Ray (2016). The Squadrons and Units of the Fleet Air Arm. Air Britain Historians Limited. ISBN 978-0-85130-489-2.
- Wragg, David (2019). The Fleet Air Arm Handbook 1939-1945. Cheltenham, Gloucestershire, UK: The History Press. ISBN 978-0-7509-9303-6.
