= 891 Naval Air Squadron =

Inactive flying squadron of the Royal Navy's Fleet Air Arm

- Squadron badge
- Active: 1942–1943; 1945; 1954–1956; 1956–1961
- Disbanded: 27 July 1961
- Country: United Kingdom
- Branch: Royal Navy
- Type: Single-seat fighter squadron
- Role: Carrier-based fighter squadron
- Part of: Fleet Air Arm
- Home station: See Naval air stations section for full list.
- Mottos: Venamus ut necemus (Latin for 'We search in order to kill')
- Engagements: World War II: Operation Torch
- Battle honours: North Africa 1942

Commanders
- Notable commanders: Lieutenant Commander Maurice Andrew Birrell, DSC, RN

Insignia
- Squadron Badge Description: White, in base three bars wavy blue overall a representation of the Polynesian god Kon Tiki red and gold (1955) [The commanding officer of the squadron contacted Thor Heyerdahl to request authorisation for the use of the Kon Tiki deity's head as the squadron's emblem]
- Identification Markings: 281-283 (Sea Venom); 435-444 (Sea Venom September 1956); 221-233 (Sea Venom FAW.20); 435-444 (Sea Venom FAW.21/22)
- Fin Carrier Codes: O (Sea Venom); B:C (Sea Venom FAW.21/22)

Aircraft flown
- Fighter: Hawker Sea Hurricane; Grumman Hellcat; de Havilland Sea Vampire; de Havilland Sea Venom

891 Naval Air Squadron (891 NAS), sometimes referred to as 891 Squadron, was a Fleet Air Arm (FAA) naval air squadron of the United Kingdom's Royal Navy (RN). It most recently operated de Havilland Sea Venom all-weather fighter aircraft between September 1956 and July 1961.

In August 1942 the squadron transferred from RNAS Lee-on-Solent where it had been formed in July to RNAS Charlton Horethorne with Hawker Sea Hurricane aircraft to prepare for carrier operations, later transferring to RNAS St Merryn and then embarking on HMS Dasher to take part in Operation Torch. The squadron was disbanded in April 1943, but was reformed in June 1945 and equipped with Grumman Hellcat in order to operate in the Pacific, but the war ended before they could be deployed. The squadron was disbanded in September 1945.

In November 1954, 891 Naval Air Squadron was recommissioned with de Havilland Sea Venom under the command of Lieutenant Commander M.A. Birrell, DSC, RN. The squadron was initially equipped with two de Havilland Sea Venom fighters and four de Havilland Sea Vampire T.22 trainer aircraft, then on 1 March 1955 the squadron formed an 'X' flight commanded by Lieutenant Commander G.M. Jude, RAN, to train Royal Australian Navy crews in preparation for the formation of 808 Squadron RAN in August 1955 the squadron replaced its FAW.20 Sea Venoms with FAW.21 variants in June 1955, then in April 1956 the squadron disbanded, only to reform in September 1957 under the command of Lieutenant Commander I.J. Brown, RN, using RNAS Merryfield with Sea Venom FAW.22. 891 Naval Air Squadron was the last de Havilland Sea Venom squadron to see active service, when, operating from HMS Centaur, it became involved in Operation Damen, carrying out rocket attacks against Yemeni rebel infiltrations in Aden. The squadron disbanded as the last frontline de Havilland Sea Venom squadron in July 1961.

== History ==
=== Single-seat fighter squadron (1942-1943) ===
891 Naval Air Squadron was established at RNAS Lee-on-Solent (HMS Daedalus), Hampshire, England, on 1 July 1942, under the command of Lieutenant(A) M.J.S. Newman, RN. The squadron was initially tasked as a single-seat fighter unit, operating with a complement of six Hawker Sea Hurricane Mk IB fighter aircraft, the navalised version of the Hawker Hurricane fighter aircraft.

Originally designated for the Attacker-class escort carrier, HMS Stalker, this carrier was not ready when the squadron was required to support the landings in North Africa. Following its work up at RNAS Charlton Horethorne (HMS Heron II), Somerset, England and RNAS St Merryn (HMS Vulture), Cornwall, England, the unit embarked in HMS Dasher on October 15, where it was re-equipped with six Hawker Sea Hurricane Mk IIC fighter aircraft. The vessel then set sail to deliver air cover for the invasion beaches in North Africa.

In December, the squadron received three more aircraft while stationed with the Home Fleet in northern waters. During this period, RNAS Machrihanish (HMS Landrail), Argyll and Bute, Scotland and RNAS Hatston (HMS Sparrowhawk), Mainland, Orkney, served as the squadron's shore bases. The squadron was tasked with providing fighter cover for a convoy to Iceland alongside HMS Dasher. A detachment of three aircraft was on board when HMS Dasher tragically exploded in the Firth of Clyde on 27 March 1943, resulting in significant loss of life. The squadron was officially disbanded on 5 April 1943.

=== Night fighter squadron (1945) ===
On 1 June 1945, 891 Naval Air Squadron was re-established at RNAS Eglinton (HMS Gannet), County Antrim, Northern Ireland, as a single-seat night fighter unit, equipped with sixteen Grumman Hellcat aircraft. However, the squadron was disbanded at RNAS Nutts Corner (HMS Pintail), County Antrim, on 24 September of the same year.

=== Sea Venom (1954-1961) ===
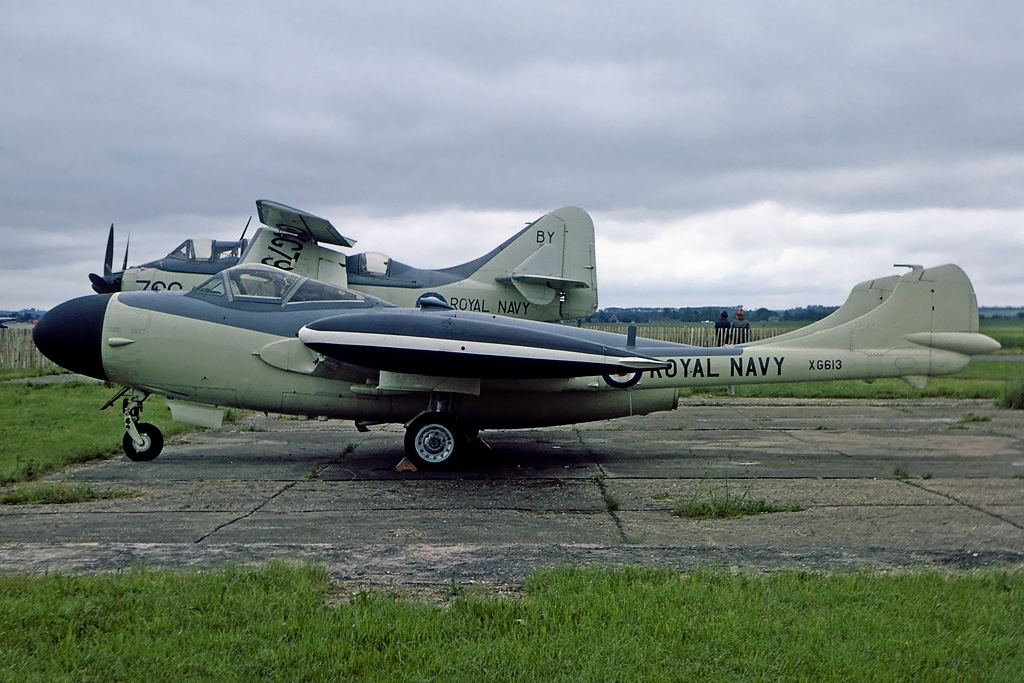
de Havilland Sea Venom FAW21 (DH-112), of the type used by 891 NAS

The squadron was re-established at RNAS Yeovilton (HMS Heron), Somerset, on 8 November 1954, as an All-Weather Fighter squadron equipped initially with two de Havilland Sea Venom FAW.20 jet fighters and four de Havilland Sea Vampire T.22 two-seat jet trainer aircraft. By the onset of the New Year, the number of de Havilland Sea Venom aircraft had increased to nine. In early 1956, 891 Naval Air Squadron spent several weeks aboard HMS Ark Royal in the Mediterranean, but it was ultimately disbanded at RNAS Yeovilton on 17 April. Additionally, 'X' Flight was established on 1 March 1955 to provide training for Royal Australian Navy personnel on this aircraft type, in anticipation of the formation of 808 Squadron RAN in August.

In September 1956, 891 Naval Air Squadron was re-established at RNAS Yeovilton (HMS Heron), equipped with eight de Havilland Sea Venom FAW.21 all-weather fighter aircraft. Due to runway reconstruction at RNAS Yeovilton, RNAS Merryfield served as the shore base starting in November. The squadron embarked in HMS Bulwark in March 1957, engaging in several periods of operations in Home Waters. In April 1958, it deployed to the Far East for exercises alongside United States Navy and Royal Australian Navy carriers and vessels, returning through Aden.

In June 1959, 891 Naval Air Squadron transferred to HMS Centaur and again set sail for the Far East, with a visit to Australia in November. Upon returning home in April 1960, the squadron was primarily stationed at RNAS Yeovilton, except for a deployment to Norway for an exercise in September, until its disbandment on 27 July 1961.

== Aircraft operated ==
The squadron has operated a number of different aircraft types, including:

- Hawker Sea Hurricane Mk IB fighter aircraft (July -October 1942)
- Hawker Sea Hurricane Mk IlC fighter aircraft (October 1942 - April 1943)
- Grumman Hellcat F. Mk. I fighter aircraft (June - August 1945)
- Grumman Hellcat N.F. Mk II night fighter aircraft (August - September 1945)
- de Havilland Sea Vampire T.22 jet trainer aircraft (November 1954 - January 1955)
- de Havilland Sea Venom FAW.20 all-weather fighter aircraft (November 1954 - June 1955)
- de Havilland Sea Venom FAW.21 all-weather fighter aircraft (June 1955 - April 1956)
- de Havilland Sea Venom FAW.21 all-weather fighter aircraft (September 1956 - December 1957)
- de Havilland Sea Venom FAW.22 all-weather fighter aircraft (December 1957 - July 1961)

=== 891X Flight ===
- de Havilland Vampire FB.5 fighter-bomber (March - May 1955)
- de Havilland Sea Venom FAW.20 all-weather fighter aircraft (March - August 1955)
De Havilland DH.112 Sea Venom FAW.22 ‘XG730 - 438’ previously operated by 891 Naval Air Squadron
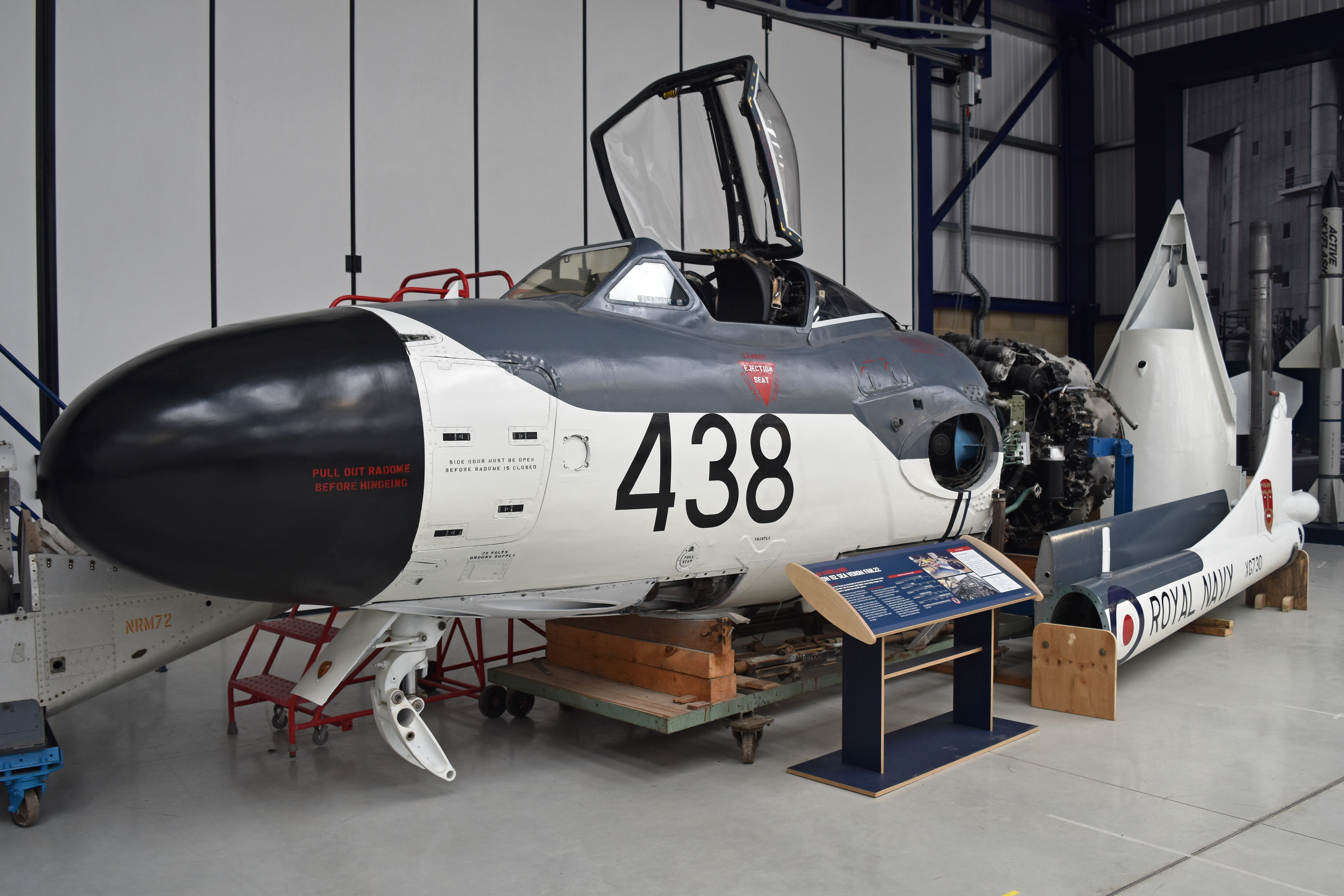
De Havilland DH.112 Sea Venom FAW.22 ‘XG730 - 438’ on display in the de Havilland Aircraft Museum, Salisbury Hall, London Colney, UK, in 891 NAS markings

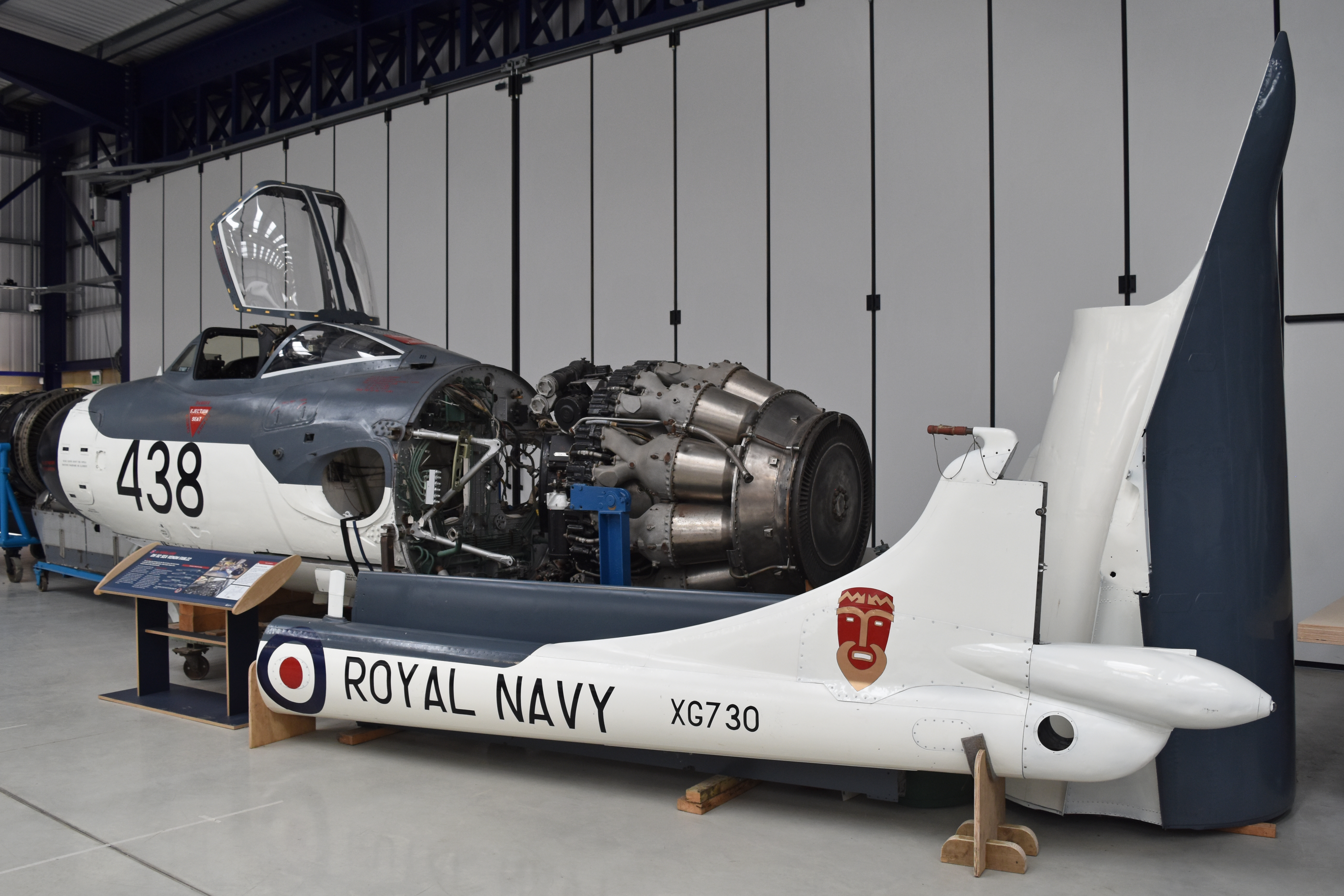
De Havilland DH.112 Sea Venom FAW.22 ‘XG730 - 438’

== Battle honours ==
The battle honours awarded to 891 Naval Air Squadron are:

- North Africa 1942

== Naval air stations and aircraft carriers ==
891 Naval Air Squadron operated from a number of naval air stations of the Royal Navy and Royal Air Force stations, in the UK and overseas, and also a number of Royal Navy fleet carriers and escort carriers and other airbases overseas:

1942 - 1943

- Royal Naval Air Station Lee-on-Solent (HMS Daedalus), Hampshire, (1 July - 11 August 1942)
- Royal Naval Air Station Charlton Horethorne (HMS Heron II), Somerset, (11 August - 9 September 1942)
- Royal Naval Air Station St Merryn (HMS Vulture), Cornwall, (9 September - 8 October 1942)
- Royal Naval Air Maintenance Yard Belfast (HMS Gadwall), County Antrim, (8 - 12 October 1942)
- HMS Argus (12 - 15 October 1942)
- HMS Dasher (15 October - 18 November 1942)
- Royal Naval Air Station Donibristle (HMS Merlin), Fife, (18 November - 10 December 1942)
- Royal Naval Air Station Machrihanish (HMS Landrail), Argyll and Bute, (10 December 1942 - 25 January 1943)
- HMS Dasher (25 January - 26 February 1943)
- Royal Naval Air Station Hatston (HMS Sparrowhawk), Mainland, Orkney, (26 February - 22 March 1943)
- Royal Naval Air Station Machrihanish (HMS Landrail), Argyll and Bute, (22 March - 5 April 1943)
  - HMS Dasher (Detachment three aircraft 22 March 1943, lost with ship 27 March 1943)
- disbanded - (5 April 1943)

1945

- Royal Naval Air Station Eglinton (HMS Gannet), County Londonderry, (1 June - 11 August 1945)
- Royal Naval Air Station Nutts Corner (HMS Pintail), County Antrim, (11 August - 24 September 1945)
- disbanded - (24 September 1945)

1954 - 1956

- Royal Naval Air Station Yeovilton (HMS Heron), Somerset, (8 November 1954 - 5 January 1956)
  - HMS Bulwark (Detachment six aircraft Deck Landing Practice (DLP) 4–7 July 1955)
- HMS Ark Royal (5 - 19 January 1956)
- Royal Naval Air Station Hal Far (HMS Falcon), Malta, (19 - 30 January 1956)
- HMS Ark Royal (30 January - 26 March 1956)
- Royal Naval Air Station Yeovilton (HMS Heron), Somerset, (26 March - 17 April 1956)
- disbanded - (17 April 1956)

1956 - 1961

- Royal Naval Air Station Yeovilton (HMS Heron), Somerset, (3 September - 19 November 1956)
- Royal Naval Air Station Lossiemouth (HMS Fulmar), Moray, (19 - 30 November 1956)
- Royal Naval Air Station Merryfield, Somerset, (30 November 1956 - 2 March 1957)
- Royal Naval Air Station Brawdy (HMS Goldcrest), Pembrokeshire, (2 - 14 March 1957)
- Royal Naval Air Station Merryfield, Somerset, (14 March - 21 May 1957)
- Royal Naval Air Station Lossiemouth (HMS Fulmar), Moray, (21–28 May 1957)
- Royal Naval Air Station Merryfield, Somerset, (28 May - 25 June 1957)

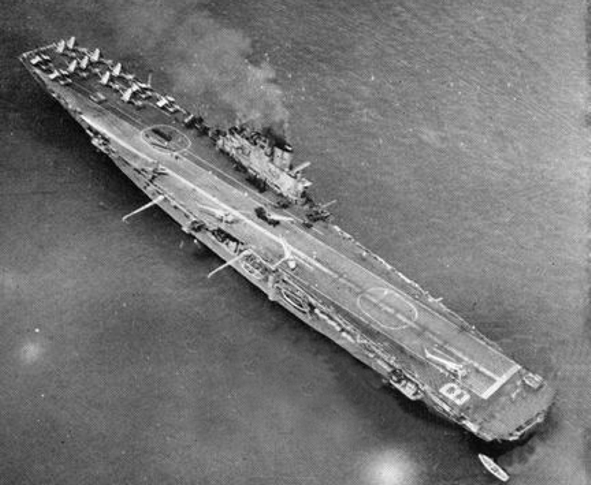
HMS Bulwark (R08)

- HMS Bulwark (25 June - 19 August 1957)
- Royal Naval Air Station Merryfield, Somerset, (19 - 28 August 1957)
- HMS Bulwark (28 August - 2 November 1957)
- Royal Naval Air Station Merryfield, Somerset, (2 - 18 November 1957)
- HMS Bulwark (18 - 27 November 1957)
- Royal Naval Air Station Merryfield, Somerset, (27 November 1957 - 12 January 1958)
- HMS Bulwark (12 January - 17 May 1958)
  - RN Air Section Gibraltar, Gibraltar, (Detachment four aircraft 26 March - 7 April 1958)
- Royal Air Force Kai Tak, Hong Kong, (17 May - 3 June 1958)
- HMS Bulwark (3 June - 24 October 1958)
  - Royal Air Force Khormaksar, Yemen, (Detachment four/six aircraft 26 July - 4 August 1958)
  - Royal Air Force Khormaksar, Yemen, (Detachment five aircraft 10–20 August 1958)
  - Royal Air Force Khormaksar, Yemen, (Detachment four aircraft 28 August - 9 September 1958)
- Royal Naval Air Station Hal Far (HMS Falcon), Malta, (24 - 28 October 1958)
- Royal Naval Air Station Yeovilton (HMS Heron), Somerset, (28 October 1958 - 23 January 1959)

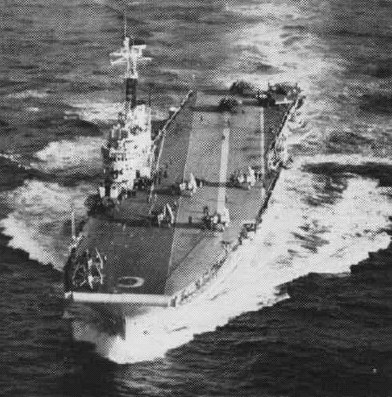
HMS Centaur

- HMS Centaur (23 January - 20 February 1959)
- Royal Naval Air Station Hal Far (HMS Falcon), Malta, (20 February - 3 March 1959)
- HMS Centaur (3 - 23 March 1959)
- Royal Naval Air Station Yeovilton (HMS Heron), Somerset, (23 March - 29 April 1959)
- HMS Centaur (29 April - 13 June 1959)
- Royal Naval Air Station Hal Far (HMS Falcon), Malta, (13 - 21 June 1959)
- HMS Centaur (21 June - 5 September 1959)
  - Royal Air Force Khormaksar, Yemen, (Detachment two aircraft 3–9 July 1959)
  - Royal Air Force Drigh Road, Pakistan, (Detachment six aircraft 31 July - 11 August 1959)
- Royal Air Force Seletar, Singapore, (5 - 30 September 1959)
- HMS Centaur (30 September 1959 - 25 April 1960)
  - Royal Air Force Kai Tak, Hong Kong, (Detachment one aircraft 5–16 November 1959)
  - Royal Air Force Seletar, Singapore, (Detachment four aircraft 21 January - 4 February 1960)
- Royal Naval Air Station Yeovilton (HMS Heron), Somerset, (25 April - 14 June 1960)
  - HMS Centaur (Detachment four aircraft 31 May - 2 June 1960)
- HMS Centaur (14 June - 22 July 1960)
- Royal Naval Air Station Yeovilton (HMS Heron), Somerset, (22 July - 24 September 1960)
  - Royal Naval Air Station Lossiemouth (HMS Fulmar), Moray, (Detachment six aircraft 8–9 September 1960)
- Bodø Main Air Station, Norway, (24 September - 1 October 1960)
- Sola Air Station, Norway, (transit) (1 - 3 October 1960)
- Royal Naval Air Station Yeovilton (HMS Heron), Somerset, (3 October 1960 - 27 January 1961)
- Royal Naval Air Station Lossiemouth (HMS Fulmar), Moray, (27 January - 24 February 1961)
- Royal Naval Air Station Yeovilton (HMS Heron), Somerset, (24 February - 21 March 1961)
- Royal Naval Air Station Culdrose (HMS Seahawk), Cornwall, (21 - 24 March 1961)
- Royal Naval Air Station Yeovilton (HMS Heron), Somerset, (24 March - 27 July 1961)
- disbanded - (27 July 1961)

=== 891X Flight ===
- Royal Naval Air Station Yeovilton (HMS Heron), Somerset, (1 March - 10 August 1955)
- became 808 Squadron RAN (10 August 1955)

== Commanding officers ==
List of commanding officers of 890 Naval Air Squadron with date of appointment:

1942 - 1943

- Lieutenant(A) M.J.S. Newman, RN, from 1 July 1942
- Lieutenant(A) B.H.StA.H. Hurle-Hobbs, RN, from 12 March 1943
- Lieutenant O.N. Bailey, RN, from 19 March 1943
- disbanded - 5 April 1943

1945

- Lieutenant Commander N. Perrett, RNZNVR, from 1 June 1945
- disbanded - 24 September 1945

1954 - 1956

- Lieutenant Commander M.A. Birrell, DSC, RN, from 8 November 1954
- disbanded - 17 April 1956

1956 - 1961

- Lieutenant Commander I.J. Brown, RN, from 3 September 1956
- Lieutenant Commander W.G.B. Black, RN, from 5 December 1957
- Lieutenant Commander J.F. Blunden, RN, from 10 December 1957
- Major J. Harris, USMC, from 1 September 1958
- Lieutenant Commander L.A. Jeyes, RN, from 19 September 1958
- Lieutenant Commander J.B. Robathan, RN, from 21 January 1960
- Lieutenant Commander M.L. Brown, RN, from 29 August 1960
- disbanded - 27 July 1961

=== 89IX Flight ===
- Lieutenant Commander G.M. Jude, RAN, from 1 March 1955
- became 808 Squadron RAN 10 August 1955

Note: Abbreviation (A) signifies Air Branch of the RN or RNVR.

== See also ==
- Exercise Strikeback
