= 894 Naval Air Squadron =

Inactive flying squadron of the Royal Navy's Fleet Air Arm

- Squadron badge
- Active: 1942–1946; 1957–1960
- Disbanded: 17 December 1960
- Country: United Kingdom
- Branch: Royal Navy
- Type: Single-seat fighter squadron
- Role: Carrier-based fighter squadron
- Part of: Fleet Air Arm
- Home station: See Naval air stations section for full list.
- Mottos: Omnium capax ubique (Latin for 'Capable of anything, anywhere')
- Engagements: World War II: Operation Governor; Operation Avalanche; Operation Mascot; Operation Turbine; Operation Offspring; Operation Goodwood; Operation Meridian; Operation Iceberg
- Battle honours: Salerno 1943; Norway 1944; East Indies 1945; Palembang 1945; Okinawa 1945; Japan 1945

Insignia
- Squadron Badge Description: Blue, a sea horse wings addorsed rising white (1944)
- Identification Markings: single letters (Seafire by June 1944); 1A+ (Seafire HMS Indefatigable, July 1944); P6+ (Seafire by October 1944); H6A+ (Seafire December 1944); 130-154 (Seafire by August 1945); 485-499 (Sea Venom)
- Fin Carrier Codes: S (Seafire August 1945); J:E:A (Sea Venom)

Aircraft flown
- Fighter: Grumman Martlet; Supermarine Seafire; de Havilland Sea Venom

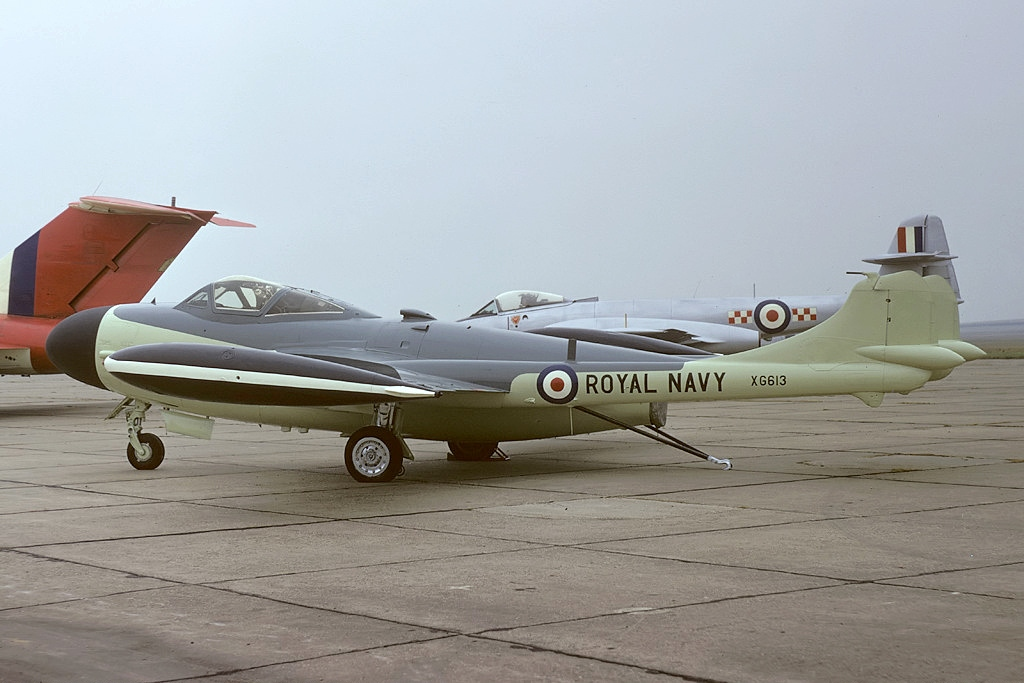
de Havilland Sea Venom FAW.21, of the type initially used by 894 NAS

894 Naval Air Squadron (894 NAS), sometimes referred to as 894 Squadron, was a Fleet Air Arm (FAA) naval air squadron of the United Kingdom’s Royal Navy (RN). It most recently operated de Havilland Sea Venom between January 1957 and December 1960.

Formed at RN Air Section Norfolk, Virginia, in August 1942, as a fighter squadron, in December, the squadron joined HMS Battler for the UK, eventually arriving at HMS Sparrowhawk, RNAS Hatston, in February, where it later joined HMS Illustrious in July. The squadron provided air cover for the Salerno landings in September 1943. It returned to HMS Dipper, RNAS Henstridge, in late October 1943 and became part of the 24th Naval Fighter Wing. The squadron boarded HMS Indefatigable in July, covering operations over Norway, including two attacks on the battleship Tirpitz.

In November 1943, the squadron joined the aircraft carrier HMS Implacable for Ceylon. The squadron supported attacks on Sumatra in January 1945 and the Sakishima Islands in March and April 1945. The squadron operated over Japan during the final days of the war, but was disbanded at HMS Siskin, RNAS Gosport, in March 1946.

In January 1957, 894 Squadron was re-established at Merryfield as an all-weather fighter squadron. The squadron boarded HMS Eagle in August and spent a significant part of 1958 in the Mediterranean. Most of 1959 was spent at Yeovilton, but in February 1960, the squadron joined HMS Albion for a deployment in the Far East. It returned home and disbanded at HMS Heron, RNAS Yeovilton, in December.

== History ==
=== Single-seat fighter squadron (1942-1946) ===
On 15 July 1942, the personnel of 894 Naval Air Squadron gathered at RNAS Stretton (HMS Blackcap), Cheshire, England, before departing for the United States. Upon reaching Naval Air Station Norfolk in Virginia, the squadron was officially established on 15 August 1942 as a single-seat fighter unit, with Lieutenant Commander(A) D. A. Van Epps, RNVR, assuming command. The squadron was equipped with six Grumman Martlet Mk IV, an American carrier-based fighter aircraft. These were the counterparts to the US Navy's F4F-4B variant were generally comparable to the Mk II, featuring two extra wing-mounted guns and powered by the Wright Cyclone engine. It was among the limited number of FAA units that utilised the training carrier USS Wolverine, a repurposed paddle steamer, for Deck Landing Training (DLT).

The squadron embarked in the Attacker-class escort carrier, HMS Battler, on 8 December, departing for the United Kingdom. It disembarked at RNAS Machrihanish (HMS Landrail), Argyll and Bute, Scotland, on 8 January 1943 and subsequently relocated to RNAS Hatston (HMS Sparrowhawk), Mainland, Orkney, on 18 February, where it underwent re-equipment with nine Supermarine Seafire F Mk.IIc fighter aircraft, a navalised version of the Supermarine Spitfire.

In June 1943, Lieutenant Commander F.R.A. Turnbull, DSC, RN, took command of the unit and in July, 894 Naval Air Squadron embarked on the lead ship of her class, HMS Illustrious, for trip to Iceland, subsequently participating in an operation along the Norwegian coastline. HMS Illustrious was later assigned to Force A for Operation Governor, departing on 23 July 23. This operation aimed to entice the German battleship Tirpitz, along with other heavy German warships, to leave their harbor by creating the illusion of a raid on southern Norway. In August, HMS Illustrious proceeded to Malta to integrate with Force H, which served as a protective contingent for the landings as part of Operation Avalanche and aircraft from Force H conducted Combat Air Patrol (CAP) and Anti-Submarine Patrol (ASP) missions during daylight hours, with some aircraft temporarily operating from a seized airstrip. The squadron arrived back at RNAS Henstridge (HMS Dipper), Somerset, England, in late October 1943 becoming a component of the 24th Naval Fighter Wing, along with 887 Naval Air Squadron, on 25 October and subsequently it re-equipped with twelve Supermarine Seafire F Mk. III fighter aircraft in the following month.

The 24th Naval Fighter Wing relocated to RNAS Burscough (HMS Ringtail)), Lancashire, England, on 8 January 1944, the squadron coming under the command of Lieutenant Commander(A) C. Walker, RN. A month later, on 6 February, the Wing transferred to RAF Ballyhalbert, County Down, Northern Ireland. Eventually, the Wing was tasked with operations from RAF Culmhead, Somerset, England, where it provided escort for Royal Air Force Hawker Typhoon aircraft engaged in anti-shipping missions in the English Channel during April 1944. On 15 May, the 24th NFW returned to RAF Ballyhalbert to prepare for its embarkation aboard the Implacable-class aircraft carrier, HMS Indefatigable on 23 May, which included a week dedicated to deck landing training. Subsequently, the Wing disembarked to RNAS Eglinton (HMS Gannet), County Londonderry, Northern Ireland, on 30 May.

On 24 July, the squadron fully embarked in HMS Indefatigable to conduct operations in and around Norway. These included Operations Mascot, Turbine, Offspring and Goodwood, incorporating two assaults on the German battleship Tirpitz and the downing of two German aircraft on 22 August.

By November 1943, the squadron had disembarked to RNAS Lee-on-Solent (HMS Daedalus), Hampshire, England, where it re-equipped with twenty-four Supermarine Seafire L Mk.III fighter aircraft prior to its deployment with HMS Indefatigable bound for Ceylon on 21 November. The squadron provided cover for Operation Meridian, the attacks on Sumatran oil installations in January 1945 and the Sakishima Gunto group of islands, part of Operation Iceberg, in the South China Sea, from March to April 1945, utilising HMS Nabthorpe, at RNAS Schofields, New South Wales, Australia, as a shore station.

Shortly prior to Victory over Japan Day, assaults were conducted on the Japanese mainland. 894 Naval Air Squadron was disbanded at RNAS Gosport (HMS Siskin), Hampshire, England, upon its arrival on 16 March 1946.

=== All-weather fighter squadron (1957-1960) ===
Reformed at RNAS Merryfield in Cornwall, England, in January 1957, the squadron was designated as an all-weather fighter unit, with Lieutenant Commander P.G. Young in charge. Initially, it operated with twelve de Havilland Sea Venom FAW.22 aircraft, although some FAW.21 models were utilised during the initial phase until the complete set of aircraft was received. The squadron embarked on the Audacious-class aircraft carrier, HMS Eagle in August, primarily conducting operations in the Mediterranean throughout 1958. The majority of 1959 was spent at RNAS Yeovilton (HMS Heron) in Cornwall, England. In February 1960, the squadron joined the Centaur-class aircraft carrier, HMS Albion for a deployment in the Far East, ultimately returning to disband at RNAS Yeovilton on 17 December.

== Aircraft operated ==
The squadron has operated a number of different aircraft types, including:

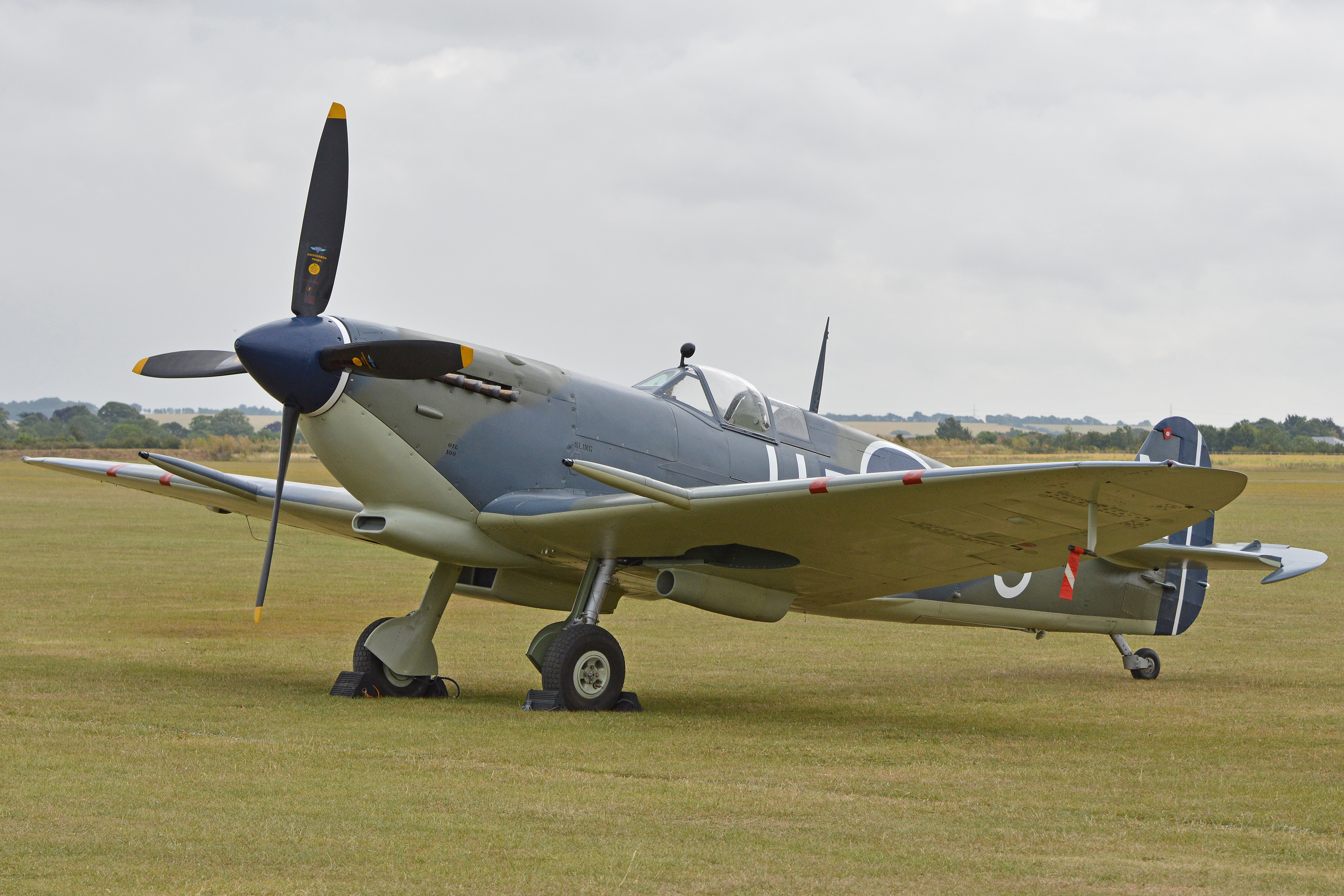
Supermarine Seafire L Mk.III

- Grumman Martlet Mk IV fighter aircraft (August 1942 - February 1943)
- Supermarine Seafire F Mk.Ib fighter aircraft (February - April 1943)
- Supermarine Seafire F Mk.IIc fighter aircraft (March - November 1943)
- Supermarine Seafire L Mk.IIc fighter aircraft (March - November 1943)
- Supermarine Seafire F Mk.III fighter aircraft (November 1943 - November 1944)
- Supermarine Seafire L Mk.III fighter aircraft (November 1944 - March 1946)
- de Havilland Sea Venom FAW.21 all-weather jet fighter-bomber (January - March 1957)
- de Havilland Sea Venom FAW.22 all-weather jet fighter-bomber (January 1957 - December 1960)

== Battle honours ==
The battle honours awarded to 894 Naval Air Squadron are:

- Salerno 1943
- Norway 1944
- East Indies 1945
- Palembang 1945
- Okinawa 1945
- Japan 1945

== Assignments ==
894 Naval Air Squadron was assigned as needed to form part of a number of larger units:

- 24th Naval Fighter Wing (October 1943 - June 1945)

== Naval air stations and aircraft carriers ==
894 Naval Air Squadron operated from a number of naval air stations of the Royal Navy, and Royal Air Force stations in the UK and overseas, and also a number of Royal Navy fleet carriers and escort carriers and other airbases overseas:

- RN Air Section Norfolk, Virginia, (15 August - 2 November 1942)
  - Naval Reserve Air Base Chicago, Illinois, (Detachment three aircraft, deck landing training (DLT) USS Wolverine 12 - 19 October 1942)
- RN Air Section Quonset Point, Rhode Island, (2 November - 6 December 1942)
- RN Air Section Norfolk, Virginia, (6 - 8 December 1942)
- HMS Battler (8 December 1942 - 8 January 1943)
- Royal Naval Air Station Machrihanish (HMS Landrail), Argyll and Bute, (8 January - 18 February 1943)
- Royal Naval Air Station Hatston (HMS Sparrowhawk), Mainland, Orkney, (18 February - 8 June 1943)
- HMS Argus (DLP 6 June 1943)
- Royal Naval Air Station Machrihanish (HMS Landrail), Argyll and Bute, (8 June - 2 July 1943)

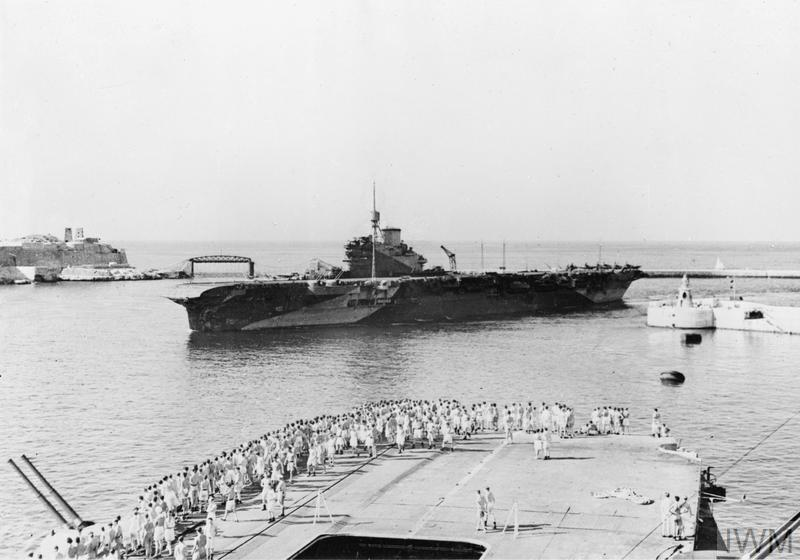
HMS Illustrious, Grand Harbour, Malta, 1943

- HMS Illustrious (2 July - 20 September 1943)
  - Royal Naval Air Station Hatston (HMS Sparrowhawk), Mainland, Orkney, (Detachment 20 - 22 July 1943)
  - RN Air Section Ta Kali, Malta, (Detachment 24 August - 2 September 1943)
  - HMS Unicorn (Detachment six aircraft 11 - 15 September 1943)
  - Paestum Airfield, Italy, (Detachment four aircraft 12 - 14 September 1943)
  - RN Air Section Ta Kali, Malta, (Detachment six aircraft 6 September 1943)
- HMS Illustrious (20 - 22 September 1943)
- RN Air Section Gibraltar, Gibraltar, (22 - 29 September 1943)
- HMS Illustrious (29 September - 19 October 1943)
- Royal Naval Air Station Henstridge (HMS Dipper), Dorest, (19 October 1943 - 8 January 1944)
- Royal Naval Air Station Burscough (HMS Ringtail), Lancashire, (8 January - 8 February 1944)
- Royal Air Force Ballyhalbert, County Down, (8 February - 20 April 1944)
  - Royal Naval Air Station Machrihanish (HMS Landrail), Argyll and Bute, (Detachment 17 - 19 March 1644)
  - HMS Indefatigable (Detachment 19 - 26 March 1944)
- Royal Air Force Culmhead, Somerset, (20 April - 15 May 1944)
- Royal Air Force Ballyhalbert, County Down, (15 - 30 May 1944)
  - HMS Indefatigable (DLT 23 May 1944)
- Royal Naval Air Station Eglinton (HMS Gannet), County Londonderry, (30 May - 18 July 1944)
- Royal Naval Air Station Grimstter (HMS Robin), Mainland, Orkney, (18 - 24 July 1944)

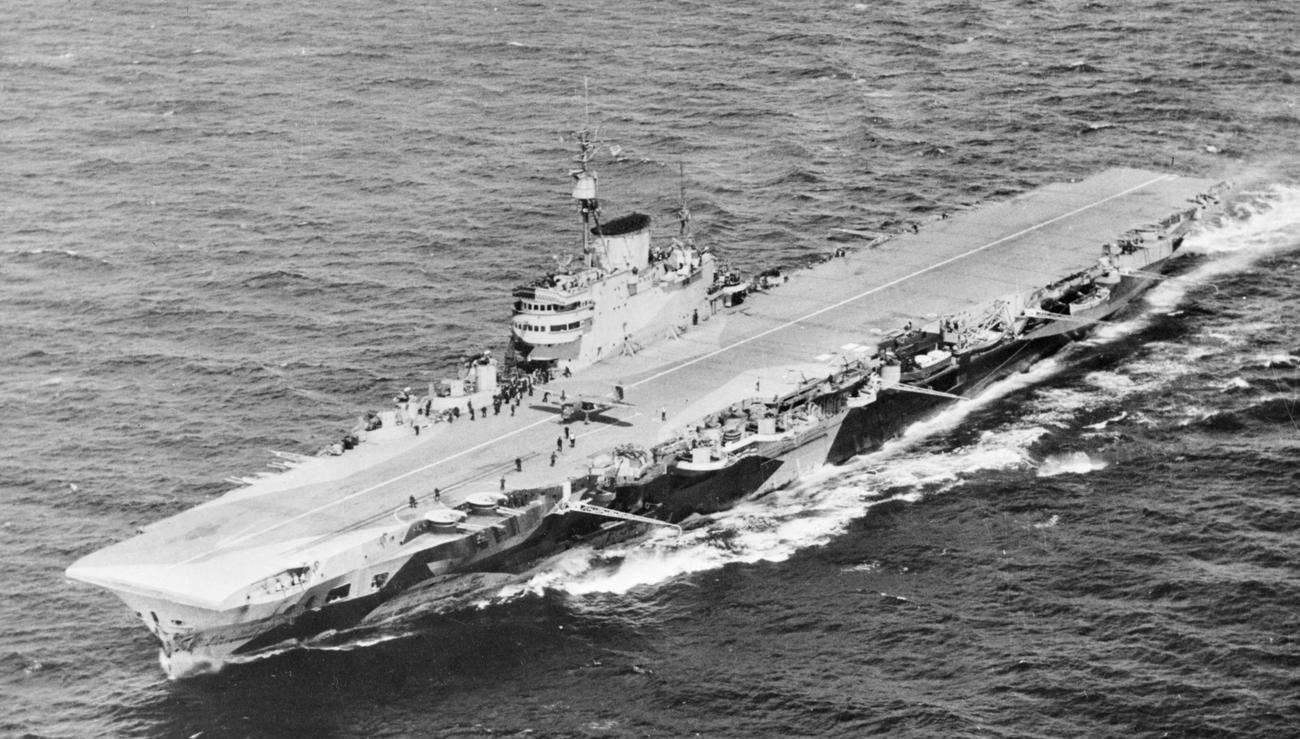
HMS Indefatigable

- HMS Indefatigable (24 July - 24 September 1944)
- Royal Air Force Skeabrae, Mainland Orkney, (24 September - 16 October 1944)
- HMS Implacable (16 - 30 October 1944)
- Royal Naval Air Station Lee-on-Solent (HMS Daedalus), Hampshire, (30 October - 21 November 1944)
- HMS Indefatigable (21 November - 10 December 1944)
- Royal Naval Air Station Katukurunda (HMS Ukussa), Ceylon, (10 - 24 December 1944)
- HMS Indefatigable (24 December 1944 - 10 February 1945)
- Royal Naval Air Station Schofields (HMS Nabthorpe), Ceylon, (10 - 25 February 1945)
- HMS Indefatigable (25 February - 5 June 1945)
  - Naval Air Station Pityilu Island, Admiralty Islands, (Detachment 13 - 16 March 1945)
- Royal Naval Air Station Schofields (HMS Nabthorpe), New South Wales, (5 June - 7 July 1945)
- HMS Indefatigable (7 July - 18 September 1945)
- Royal Naval Air Station Schofields (HMS Nabthorpe), New South Wales, (18 September - 23 November 1945)
- HMS Indefatigable (23 November - 22 December 1945)
- Royal Naval Air Station Schofields (HMS Nabthorpe), New South Wales, (22 December 1945 - 31 January 1946)
- HMS Indefatigable (31 January - 16 March 1946)
- Royal Naval Air Station Gosport (HMS Siskin), Hampshire, disbanded - 16 March 1946
- Royal Naval Air Station Merryfield, Somerset, (14 January - 28 May 1957)
- Royal Naval Air Station Brawdy (HMS Goldcrest), Pembrokeshire, (28 May - 20 June 1957)
- Royal Naval Air Station Merryfield, Somerset, (20 June - 5 August 1957)

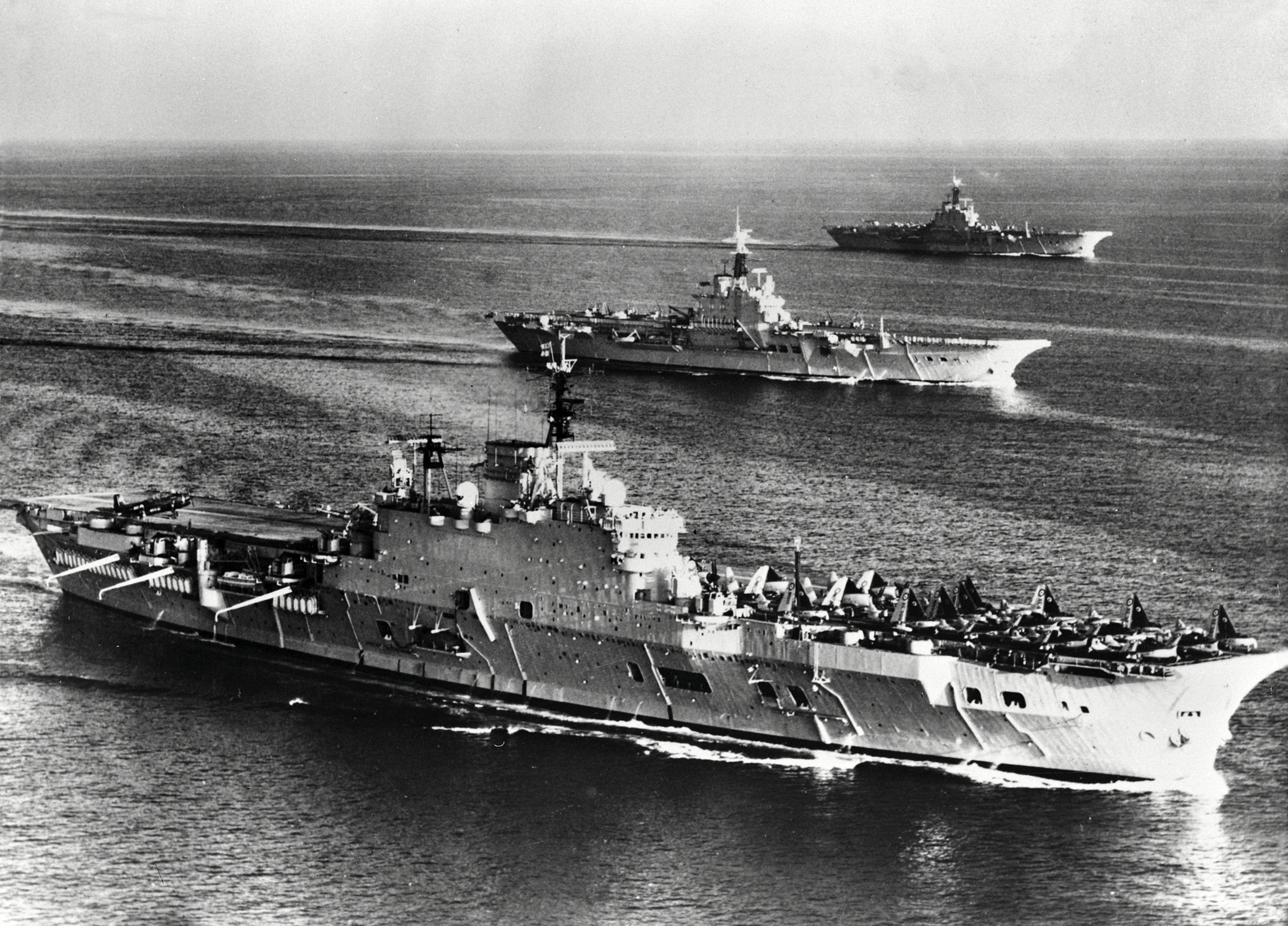
HMS Eagle (R05), HMS Albion (R07) and HMS Bulwark (R08) underway on 15 July 1958

- HMS Eagle (5 August - 30 September 1957)
  - Royal Naval Air Station Lossiemouth (HMS Fulmar), Moray, (Detachment 30 August -10 September 1957)
- Royal Naval Air Station Merryfield, Somerset, (30 September - 13 October 1957)
- HMS Eagle (13 October - 3 November 1957)
- Royal Naval Air Station Merryfield, Somerset, (3 - 14 November 1957)
- HMS Eagle (14 - 27 November 1957)
- Royal Naval Air Station Merryfield, Somerset (27 November 1957 - 28 January 1958)
- HMS Eagle (28 January - 31 March 1958)
  - Royal Naval Air Station Hal Far (HMS Falcon), Malta, (Detachment four aircraft 13 - 25 February 1958)
  - Hyères de la Palyvestre, France, (Detachment four aircraft 8 - 13 March 1958)
- Royal Naval Air Station Yeovilton (HMS Heron), Somerset, (31 March - 20 May 1958)
- HMS Eagle (20 May - 4 July 1958)
  - Royal Air Force Akrotiri, Cyprus, (Detachment four aircraft 10 - 12 June 1958)
- Royal Naval Air Station Hal Far (HMS Falcon), Malta, (4 - 16 July 1958)
- HMS Eagle (16 July - 31 October 1958)
  - Royal Naval Air Station Hal Far (HMS Falcon), Malta, (Detachment six aircraft 23 August - 9 September 1958)
  - Royal Naval Air Station Hal Far (HMS Falcon), Malta, (Detachment four aircraft 2 - 14 October 1958)
  - Royal Naval Air Station Hal Far (HMS Falcon), Malta, Detachment five aircraft 14 - 31 October 1958)
- Royal Naval Air Station Hal Far (HMS Falcon), Malta, (31 October - 20 November 1958)
- HMS Eagle (20 November - 2 December 1958)
- Royal Naval Air Station Culdrose (HMS Seahawk), Cornwall, (transit) (2 - 3 December 1958)
- Royal Naval Air Station Yeovilton (HMS Heron), Somerset, (3 December 1958 - 14 January 1959)
- HMS Eagle (14 January - 29 April 1959)
  - Royal Naval Air Station Hal Far (HMS Falcon), Malta, (Detachment sixteen aircraft 6 - 20 February 1959)
  - HMS Victorious (Detachment Ten aircraft 13 - 16 March 1959)
- Royal Naval Air Station Yeovilton (HMS Heron), Somerset, (29 April - 18 September 1959)
  - HMS Victorious (Detachment six aircraft 9 - 22 June 1959)
  - HMS Victorious (Detachment six aircraft 30 June - 9 August 1959)
- Royal Naval Air Station Brawdy (HMS Goldcrest), Pembrokeshire, (18 September - 2 October 1959)
- Royal Naval Air Station Yeovilton (HMS Heron), Somerset, (2 October 1959 - 5 February 1960)
  - HMS Victorious (DLP 19 - 23 October 1959)
  - HMS Victorious (DLP 19 - 20 January 1960)
- HMS Albion (5 February - 12 April 1960)
  - Royal Naval Air Station Hal Far (HMS Falcon), Malta, (Detachment four aircraft 16 - 17 February 1960)
  - Royal Naval Air Station Hal Far (HMS Falcon), Malta, (Detachment six aircraft 11 - 21 March 1960)
- Royal Air Force Seletar, Singapore, (12 - 29 April 1960)
- HMS Albion (29 April - 12 July 1960)
  - Royal Air Force Kai Tak, Hong Kong, (Detachment fourteen aircraft 1 - 8 July 1960)
- Royal Air Force Seletar, Singapore, (12 - 29 July 1960)
- HMS Albion (29 July - 16 September 1960)
  - Royal Air Force Kai Tak, Hong ong, (Detachment eight aircraft 23 August - 2 September 1960)
- RAAF Station Butterworth, Malaysia, (16 - 30 September 1960)
- Royal Air Force Seletar, Singapore, (30 September - 3 October 1960)
- HMS Albion (3 October - 15 December 1960)
- Royal Naval Air Station Yeovilton (HMS Heron), Somerset, (15 - 17 December 1960)
- disbanded - (17 December 1960)

== Commanding officers ==
List of commanding officers of 894 Naval Air Squadron:

1942 - 1946

- Lieutenant Commander(A) D.A. Van Epps, RNVR, from 15 August 1942
- Lieutenant Commander(A) F.R.A. Tumbull, DSC, RN, from 24 June 1943
- Lieutenant Commander(A) C. Walker, RN, from 17 January 1944
- Lieutenant Commander(A) J. Crossman, DSO, RNVR, from 22 October 1944 (PoW 9 August 1945)
- Lieutenant(A) A.D MacLeod, DSC, RNZNVR, from 9 August 1945
- Lieutenant Commander(A) J.R. Routley, RNVR, from 24 October 1945
- Lieutenant Commander(A) R.M. Crosley, DSC & Bar, RNVR, from 7 January 1946
- disbanded - 16 March 1946

1957 - 1960

- Lieutenant Commander P.G. Young, RN, from 14 January 1957
- Lieutenant Commander W.G.B. Black, RN, from 17 April 1958
- Lieutenant Commander H.E.R. Bain, RN, from 27 August 1959
- disbanded - 17 December 1960

Note: Abbreviation (A) signifies Air Branch of the RN or RNVR.

== See also ==
- Exercise Strikeback
