= RNAS Merryfield =

Royal Naval Air Station in Somerset, England

Royal Naval Air Station Merryfield
- Part of RNAS Yeovilton (HMS Heron)
- Ilton, Somerset, in England
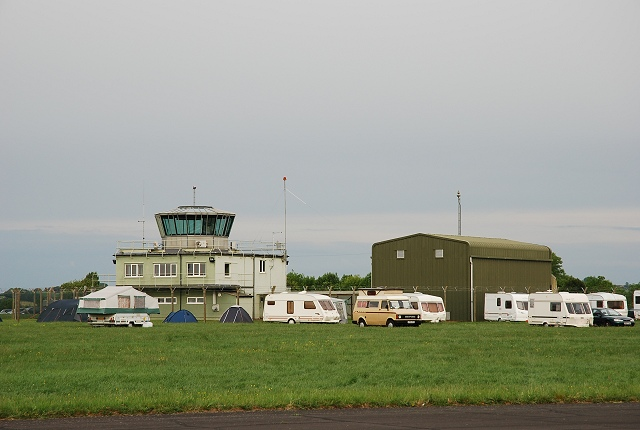
- RNAS Merryfield control tower in 2007

Site information
- Type: Royal Naval Air Station
- Owner: Ministry of Defence
- Controlled by: Royal Navy
- Condition: operational

Location
- Location in Somerset RNAS Merryfield (the United Kingdom)
- Coordinates: 50°58′12″N 002°56′24″W

Site history
- Built: 1971; 55 years ago
- In use: 1971–present
- Battles/wars: Cold War

Airfield information
- Identifiers: IATA: N/a, ICAO: EGDI, WMO: 03334
- Elevation: 45 metres (148 ft) AMSL
Runways
Direction	Length and surface
03/21	1,249 metres (4,098 ft) asphalt
09/27	1,744 metres (5,722 ft) asphalt
16/34	1,077 metres (3,533 ft) asphalt

Royal Naval Air Station Merryfield, commonly known as RNAS Merryfield, is an air station of the Royal Navy's Fleet Air Arm located 2.7 miles (4 kilometres) north-west of Ilminster, and 8.1 miles (13 kilometres) south-east of Taunton, in the English county of Somerset, in England.

== History ==
The following squadrons were located here at some point:

- 700 Naval Air Squadron
- 766 Naval Air Squadron
- 802 Naval Air Squadron
- 809 Naval Air Squadron
- 891 Naval Air Squadron
- 893 Naval Air Squadron
- 894 Naval Air Squadron

== Current use ==
The site is mainly used for military helicopter exercises, and there are a large number of lettered helicopter landing spots spread across the site on the taxiways.

== See also ==
- RNAS Yeovilton (HMS Heron) — parent station of RNAS Merryfield
