= RNAS Charlton Horethorne =

Former Royal Naval Air Station in Somerset, England

RNAS Charlton Horethorne HMS Heron II RAF Charlton Horethorne
- Charlton Horethorne Aerodrome
- Charlton Horethorne, Somerset in England

Site information
- Type: Royal Naval Air Station
- Owner: Air Ministry
- Operator: Royal Navy
- Controlled by: Fleet Air Arm
- Condition: Disused

Location
- Shown within Somerset
- Coordinates: 51°01′01″N 002°30′31″W

Site history
- Built: 1942
- In use: 1942-1948
- Fate: Farmland

Airfield information
- Elevation: 191 metres (627 ft) AMSL
Runways
Direction	Length and surface
NW/SE	900 yards (823 m) Grass
NE/SW	1,200 yards (1,097 m) Grass

Royal Naval Air Station Charlton Horethorne, commonly known as RNAS Charlton Horethorne; (commissioned HMS Heron II), is a former Royal Navy Naval Air Station in the hamlet of Sigwells in Somerset, England. It opened in 1942, as a flying training base under the administrative care of HMS Heron. It closed in 1948 and has since been returned to agricultural use.

== History ==
The site was originally planned as a satellite station for RAF Exeter for No. 10 Group of RAF Fighter Command. Construction started in the summer of 1941. The landing strip was grass rather than tarmac and few permanent buildings apart from the control tower and two blister hangars, with aircraft being protected by blast pens. Ground defence was provided by the Somerset Light Infantry.

It opened as an RAF station on 10 July 1942 and the Royal Navy was also granted lodger unit status and was immediately made available for use by the Fleet Air Arm's 886 and 887 Naval Air Squadrons, who operated with Fairey Fulmars andwere the first to occupy the site, soon to be replaced by 790 Naval Air Squadron. Various squadrons subsequently used the station either while undergoing training and preparation for service or for fighter interception training for Air Direction Radar operators or flight controllers who were trained at RNAS Yeovilton (HMS Heron), Somerset.

In August 1942 891 Naval Air Squadron transferred from RNAS Lee-on-Solent (HMS Daedalus), Hampshire, where it had been formed to Charlton Horethorne with six Hawker Sea Hurricanes to prepare for carrier operations, later transferring to RNAS St Merryn (HMS Vulture), Cornwall and then embarking on the escort carrier HMS Dasher to take part in Operation Torch. Other squadrons posted to the base during 1942 included: 782, 879 and 809 Naval Air Squadrons.

By the end of 1942, the Royal Air Force concluded that the Charlton Horethorne Relief Landing Ground was no longer necessary for its operations, leading to its transfer to the Admiralty. The facility was officially commissioned as HMS Heron II on 1 January 1943. Following this transition, the Royal Navy commenced a series of enhancements to the site's basic infrastructure, which included the erection of hangars and a specially designed control tower to replace the original watch house. Subsequently, additional hangars and storage facilities were constructed to accommodate No. 2 Seafire Servicing Unit, the only maintenance unit stationed at the airfield. In the spring of 1945, the Admiralty consented to a swap, exchanging Charlton Horethorne for the RAF station located at Zeals in Wiltshire. RNAS Charlton Horethorne was decommissioned on 17 April 1945 and reverted to RAF control.

In 1945 the base was taken over by RAF Maintenance Command who used it for storage until the end of 1947. It then became a satellite training field for RAF Old Sarum and kept on a Care and Maintenance basis until it was de-requisitioned and returned to farmland.

A number of units were here at some point:

- No. 11 Maintenance Unit RAF
- 765 Naval Air Squadron
- 780 Naval Air Squadron
- 790 Naval Air Squadron
- 794 Naval Air Squadron
- 804 Naval Air Squadron
- 808 Naval Air Squadron
- 809 Naval Air Squadron
- 879 Naval Air Squadron
- 886 Naval Air Squadron
- 887 Naval Air Squadron
- 891 Naval Air Squadron
- 893 Naval Air Squadron
- 895 Naval Air Squadron
- 897 Naval Air Squadron

== Post closure ==
The control tower was converted by Norman Clothier a local builder in Charlton Horethorne in the sixties.

The old control tower still stands and has been converted into a domestic dwelling.

== See also ==
- List of air stations of the Royal Navy
- Charlton Horethorne
