= 790 Naval Air Squadron =

Inactive flying squadron of the Royal Navy's Fleet Air Arm

- Squadron badge
- Active: 1941–1941; 1942–1949
- Disbanded: 15 November 1949
- Country: United Kingdom
- Branch: Royal Navy
- Type: Fleet Air Arm Second Line Squadron
- Role: Air Target Towing; Fighter Direction Training Unit
- Size: Squadron
- Part of: Fleet Air Arm
- Home station: See Naval air stations section for full list.
- Mottos: In alto societas (Latin for 'There's company aloft')
- Aircraft: See Aircraft flown section for full list.

Insignia
- Squadron Badge Description: Blue, upon clouds melting white a cockerel crowing proper (1943)
- Identification Markings: Y0A+ (all types); BY0A+ (from ~1943); Z8A+ & Z0A+ (from April 1945); P3A+, P8A+ & P0A+ (from August 1945); 100-110, 402-411 & 481-495 (from 1946); 150-156 & 403-414 (from 1947)
- Fin Shore Codes: DL (from 1946); CW (from 1947)

790 Naval Air Squadron (790 NAS), sometimes referred to as 790 Squadron, is an inactive Fleet Air Arm (FAA) naval air squadron of the United Kingdom’s Royal Navy (RN) which last disbanded in November 1949 at RNAS Culdrose (HMS Seahawk) in Cornwall.

It initially formed during 1941 as an Air Target Towing Unit, at HMS Landrail, RNAS Macrihanish, in Scotland, from elements of two other Fleet Air Arm squadrons, however, this only lasted for three months and the unit was disbanded, absorbed into 772 Naval Air Squadron.

It reformed the following year, in July 1942, tasked as a Fighter Direction Training Unit, at RNAS Charlton Horethorne (HMS Heron II). It provided support for the Fighter Direction School and had short spells at RAF Culmhead and RNAS Zeals (HMS Hummingbird), before reloacting to RNAS Dale (HMS Goldcrest) in Pembrokeshire, next to the new purpose built facility for the Air Direction School, Royal Naval Air Direction Centre (RNADC) Kete (HMS Harrier), in 1945. The squadron later moved to RNAS Culdrose (HMS Seahawk) during December 1947.

== History ==
=== Air Target Towing Unit (1941) ===
790 Naval Air Squadron formed on the 15 June 1941, as an Air Target Towing Unit, at RNAS Machrihanish (HMS Landrail), Argyll and Bute, Scotland. It was made up from parts of both 768 Naval Air Squadron and 772 Naval Air Squadron, equipped with Fairey Swordfish, a biplane torpedo bomber, and Blackburn Roc, a naval turret fighter aircraft. Three months later the squadron disbanded into 772 Naval Air Squadron, on the 30 September.

=== Fighter Direction Training Unit (1942–1949) ===
790 Naval Air Squadron reformed on the 27 July 1942, at RNAS Charlton Horethorne (HMS Heron II), Somerset, England, attached to the Fighter Direction School. The squadron was equipped with Airspeed Oxford, a twin-engine trainer aircraft, and Fairey Fulmar, a carrier-borne reconnaissance and fighter aircraft. It used these to support the training of Fighter Direction Officers. The Airspeed Oxford aircraft would act as the 'enemy bombers' and the Fairey Fulmar aircraft would be the 'fighter aircraft' that the trainees would direct to intercept.

In June 1944 the Fairey Fulmar aircraft were withdrawn and were replaced with Fairey Firefly, a carrier-borne fighter and anti-submarine aircraft. The squadron briefly operated from RAF Culmhead, Somerset, during August and September of that year, but later moved to RNAS Zeals (HMS Hummingbird), Wiltshire, on the 1 April 1945.

On the 30 August 1945, the squadron relocated to RNAS Dale (HMS Goldcrest), Dale, Pembrokeshire. The squadron continued to provide live interception flights but now for the new purpose built Air Direction School, which was located 1 mile South of RNAS Dale, at HMS Harrier, also known as RN Aircraft Direction Centre Kete.

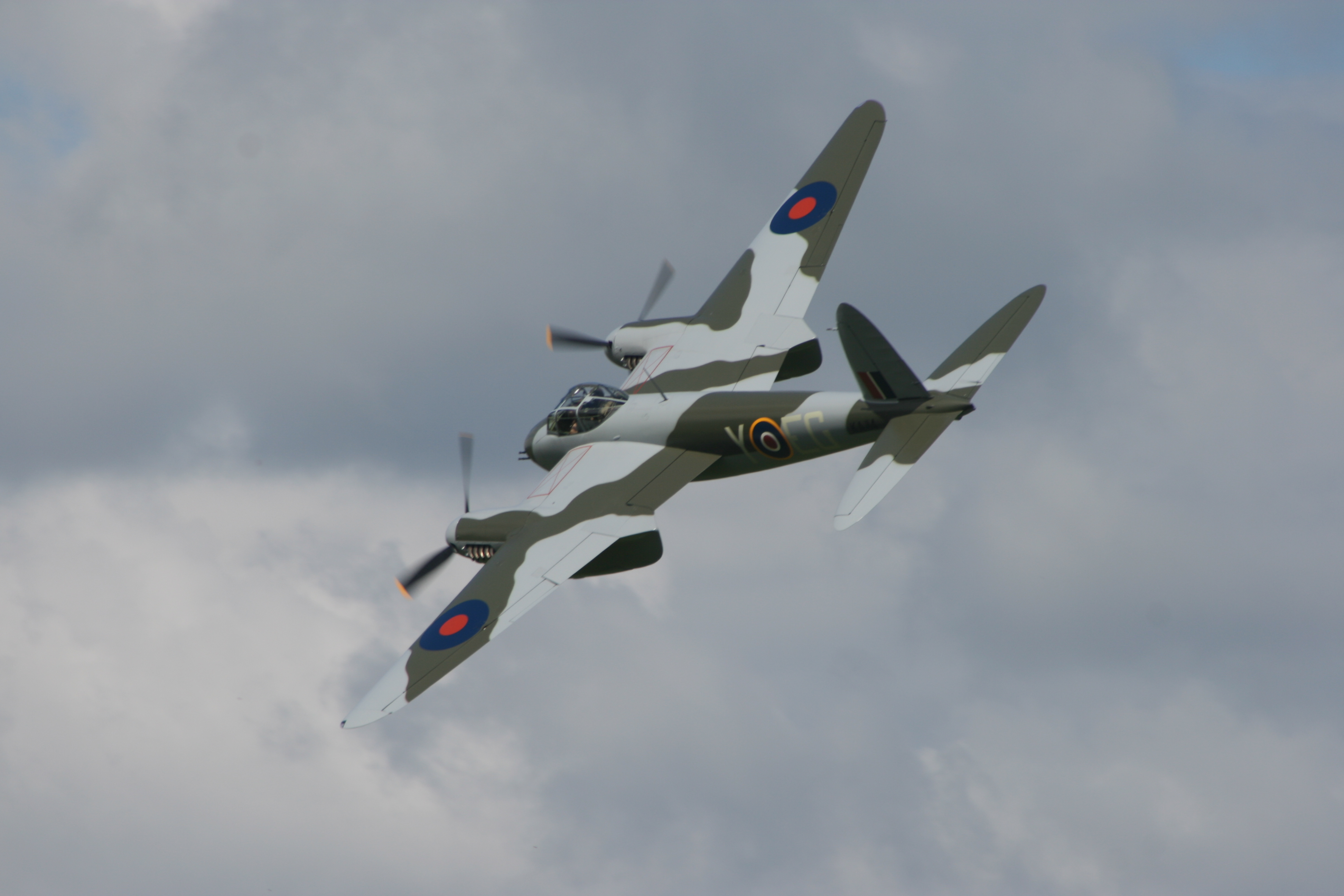
de Havilland Mosquito; an example of the type used by 790 NAS

Here the squadron operated the twin-engined Avro Anson multi-role aircraft, the biplane de Havilland Dominie short-haul transport/airliner, Fairey Firefly I, a fighter and anti-submarine aircraft, de Havilland Mosquito FB.6 & B.25, and de Havilland Sea Mosquito TR.33 variants of the twin engine multi-role aircraft, the twin-engined Airspeed Oxford training aircraft, various marks of Supermarine Seafire, a navalised version of the Supermarine Spitfire fighter aircraft, and the Grumman Wildcat an American carrier-based fighter aircraft. 790 Naval Air Squadron moved to RNAS Culdrose (HMS Seahawk), Cornwall, on the 13 December 1947, it operated out of here for the next couple of years before disbanding on the 15 November 1949.

== Aircraft flown ==
The squadron has operated a number of different aircraft types, including:

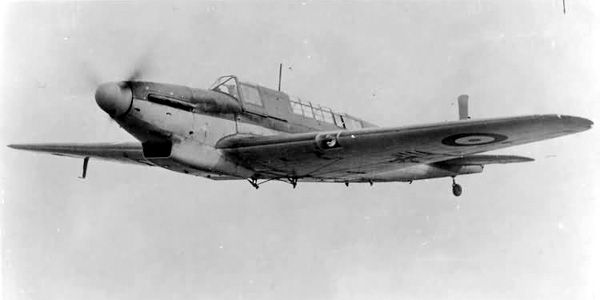
Fairey Fulmar Mk I

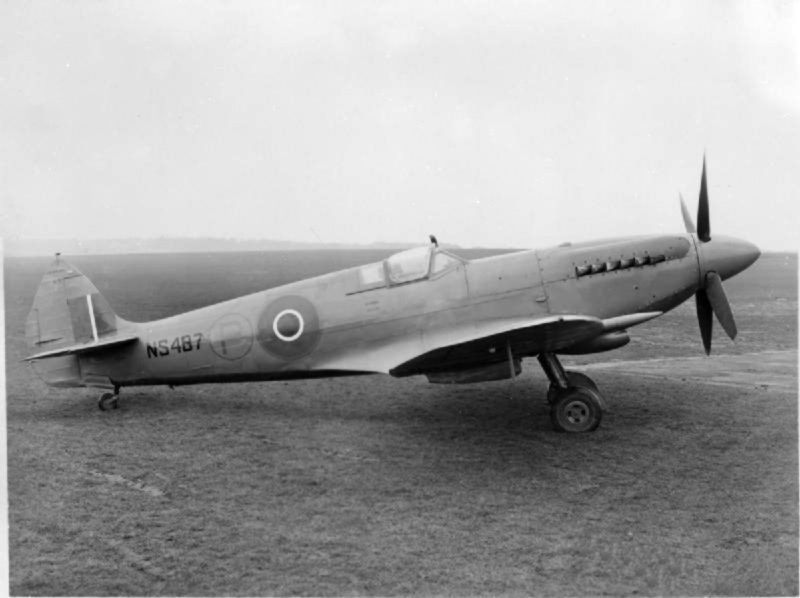
Supermarine Seafire Mk.XV

- Fairey Swordfish I torpedo bomber (June 1941 - September 1941)
- Blackburn Roc fighter aircraft (June 1941 - September 1941)
- Airspeed Oxford trainer aircraft (July 1942 - October 1947)
- Fairey Fulmar Mk.I reconnaissance/fighter aircraft (July 1942 - June 1944)
- Fairey Fulmar Mk.II reconnaissance/fighter aircraft (October 1942 - June 1944)
- Fairey Firefly I fighter and anti-submarine aircraft (May 1944 - April 1947)
- Supermarine Spitfire Mk Vb fighter aircraft (February 1945)
- Supermarine Seafire Mk Ib fighter aircraft (March 1945)
- Supermarine Seafire F Mk IIc fighter aircraft (March 1945)
- Grumman Wildcat Mk V fighter aircraft (September 1945 - February 1946)
- Avro Anson C.XII multi-role trainer aircraft (November 1945)
- de Havilland Dominie short-haul airliner (December 1945 - July 1946)
- Avro Anson Mk I multi-role trainer aircraft (January 1946 - September 1947)
- de Havilland Mosquito FB Mk. VI fighter bomber (July 1946 - December 1948)
- de Havilland Mosquito B Mk.25 bomber (October 1946 - February 1948)
- Supermarine Seafire F Mk III fighter aircraft (November 1946 - February 1947)
- de Havilland Sea Mosquito TR Mk.33 torpedo bomber (December 1946 - November 1949)
- Supermarine Seafire F Mk XV fighter aircraft (May 1947 - January 1949)
- Taylorcraft Auster I liaison and observation aircraft (June - July 1948)
- Taylorcraft Auster V liaison and observation aircraft (November 1948)

== Naval air stations ==
790 Naval Air Squadron operated from a number of naval air stations of the Royal Navy, in Scotland, Wales and England:

1941

- Royal Naval Air Station Machrihanish (HMS Landrail), Argyll and Bute, (15 June 1941 - 30 September 1941)
- disbanded - 30 September 194

1942 - 1949

- Royal Naval Air Station Charlton Horethorne (HMS Heron II), Somerset, (27 July 1942 - 10 August 1944)
- Royal Air Force Culmhead, Somerset, (10 August 1944 - 26 September 1944)
- Royal Naval Air Station Charlton Horethorne (HMS Heron II), Somerset, (26 September 1944 - 1 April 1945)
- Royal Naval Air Station Zeals (HMS Hummingbird), Wiltshire, (1 April 1945 - 30 August 1945)
- Royal Naval Air Station Dale (HMS Goldcrest), Pembrokeshire, (30 August 1945 - 13 December 1947)
- Royal Naval Air Station Culdrose (HMS Seahawk), Cornwall, (13 December 1947 - 15 November 1949)
- disbanded - 15 November 1949

== Commanding officers ==
List of commanding officers of 790 Naval Air Squadron with month and year of appointment:

1941

- - not identified

1942 - 1949

- Lieutenant Commander(A) C.R. Hodgson, RNVR, from July 1942
- Lieutenant Commander(A) R.P. Demuth, RNVR, from June 1944
- Lieutenant Commander(A) G.K. Pridham, RNVR, from November 1944
- Lieutenant Commander(A) R. Williamson, RNVR, from April 1945
- Lieutenant Commander M.J.A. O'Sullivan, RN, from November 1945
- Lieutenant Commander(A) H. Muir-MacKenzie, RN, from June 1947 (KiFA)
- Lieutenant Commander(A) D.W.H. Gardner, RN, from June 1947
- Lieutenant P.S. Cole, DSC, RN, from October 1947
- Lieutenant Commander B. Sinclair, MBE, RN, from August 1948
- Lieutenant P.A. Jordan, RN, from May 1949
- disbanded - 15 November 1949

Note: Abbreviation (A) signifies Air Branch of the RN or RNVR.
