= List of aircraft carriers of the Royal Navy =

The following is a list of fleet aircraft carriers of the Royal Navy of the United Kingdom.

There are two carriers, HMS Queen Elizabeth and HMS Prince of Wales, currently in service.

== Key ==
Aircraft	The number of aircraft carried by the vessel
Displacement	Ship displacement at full combat load
Propulsion	Number of shafts, type of propulsion system, and top speed generated
Service	The dates work began and finished on the ship and its ultimate fate
Laid down	The date keel assembly was begun
Commissioned	The date the ship was commissioned
Fate	Notes on what happened to the ship: sunk, scrapped, cancelled, sold or some other

== Fleet carriers ==
=== HMS Argus ===
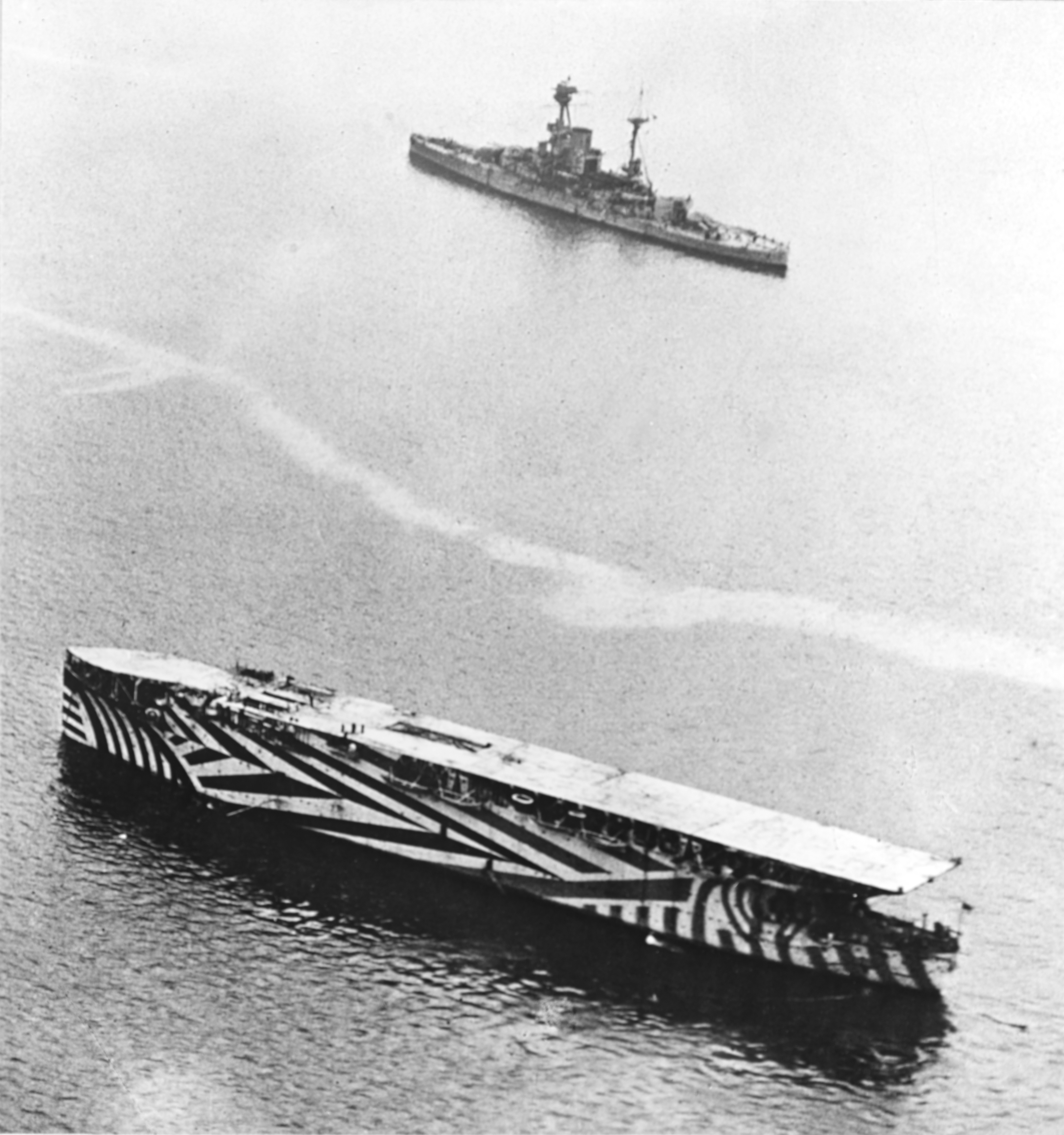
HMS Argus, 1918

Ship	Aircraft	Displacement	Propulsion	Service		
Ship	Aircraft	Displacement	Propulsion	Laid down	Commissioned	Fate
HMS Argus (I49) (ex-Conte Rosso)	18	15,775 long tons (16,028 t)	12 cylindrical boilers; 4 Parsons geared turbines, 4 shafts: max. speed 20 kn	1914	6 September 1918	Sold for scrap 1946

=== HMS Hermes ===
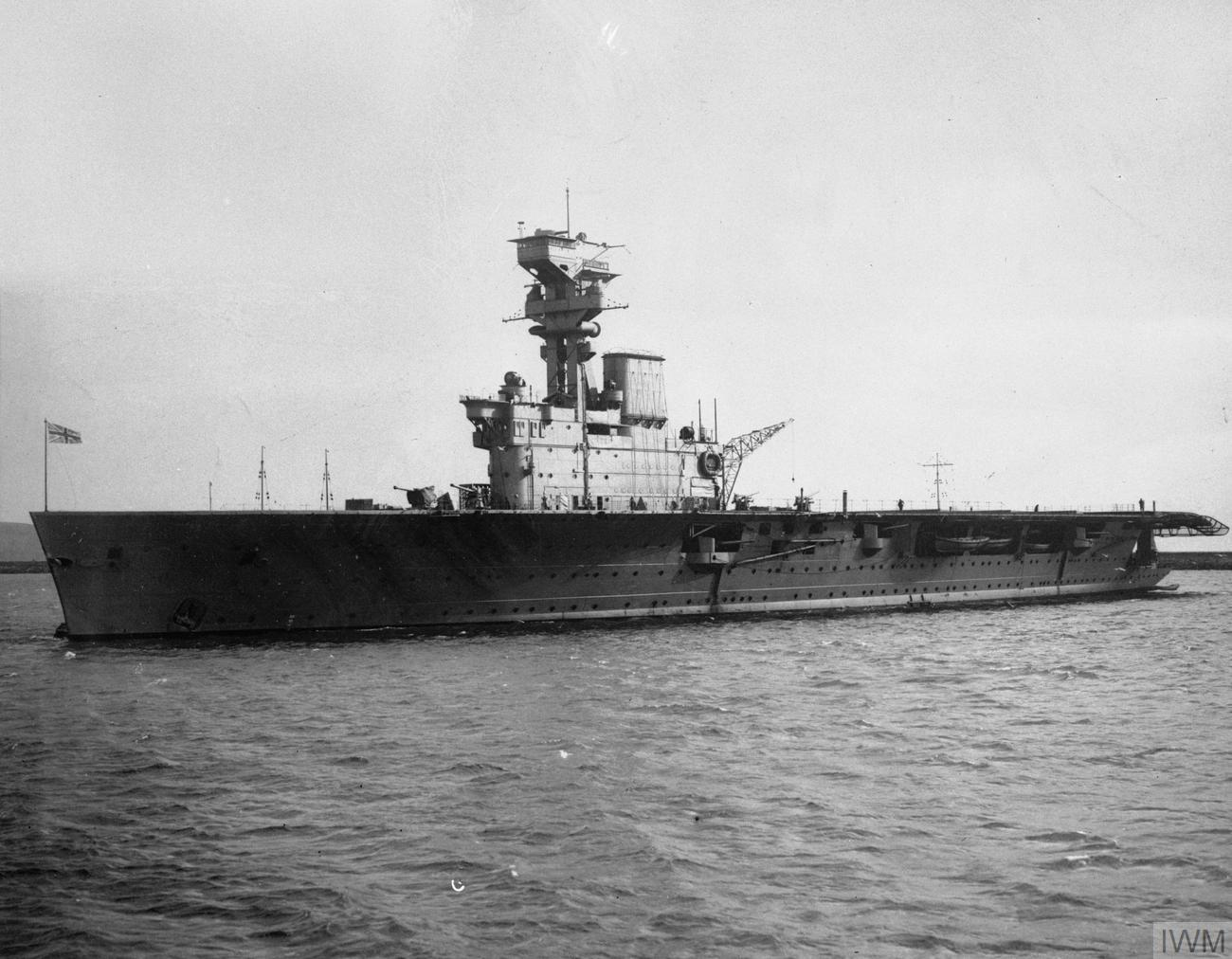
HMS Hermes August 1938

Ship	Aircraft	Displacement	Propulsion	Service		
Ship	Aircraft	Displacement	Propulsion	Laid down	Commissioned	Fate
HMS Hermes (95)	20	13,000 long tons (13,209 t)	6 Yarrow small-tube boilers, 2 shafts, Parsons geared turbines: max. speed 25 kn	15 January 1918	18 February 1924	Sunk 9 April 1942 by Japanese aircraft from the carriers Sōryū, Hiryū and Akagi.

=== HMS Eagle ===
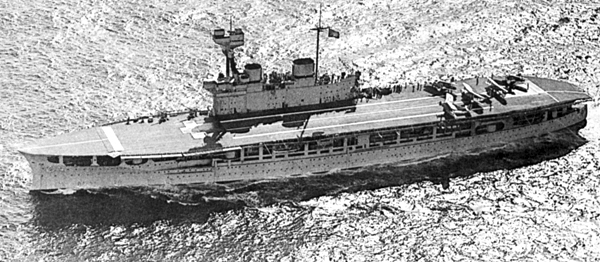
HMS Eagle

Ship	Aircraft	Displacement	Propulsion	Service		
Ship	Aircraft	Displacement	Propulsion	Laid down	Commissioned	Fate
HMS Eagle (1918) (ex-Almirante Cochrane)	25-30	26,000 long tons (26,417 t)	32 Yarrow boilers, 4 shafts, Parsons geared turbines: max. speed 24 kn	20 February 1913	20 February 1924	Torpedoed and sunk 11 August 1942, by U-73

=== Courageous class ===
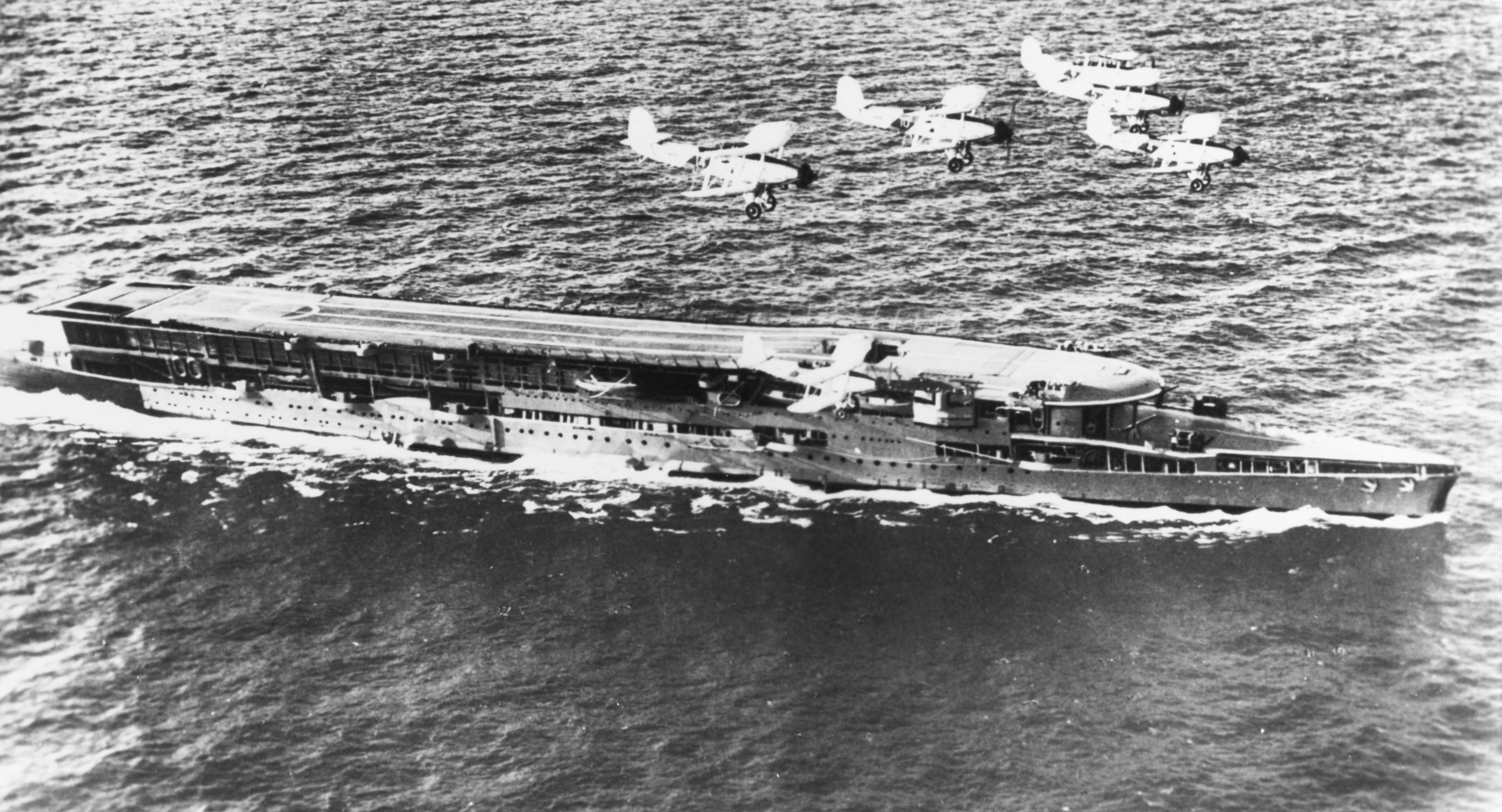
HMS Furious

Ship	Aircraft	Displacement	Propulsion	Service		
Ship	Aircraft	Displacement	Propulsion	Laid down	Commissioned	Fate
HMS Courageous (50)	48	27,419 long tons (27,859 t)	18 Yarrow small-tube boilers, 4 shafts, Parsons geared turbines: max. speed 30 kn	18 March 1915	November 1916	Sunk by U-29, 17 September 1939
HMS Glorious (77)	48	26,990 long tons (27,423 t)	18 Yarrow small-tube boilers, 4 shafts, Parsons geared turbines: max. speed 30 kn	1 May 1915	January 1917	Sunk by Scharnhorst and Gneisenau, 8 June 1940
HMS Furious (47)	36	28,500 long tons (28,957 t)	18 Yarrow small-tube boilers, 4 shafts, Brown-Curtis geared turbines: max. speed 30 kn	8 June 1915	June 1917	Sold for scrap 1948

=== HMS Ark Royal ===
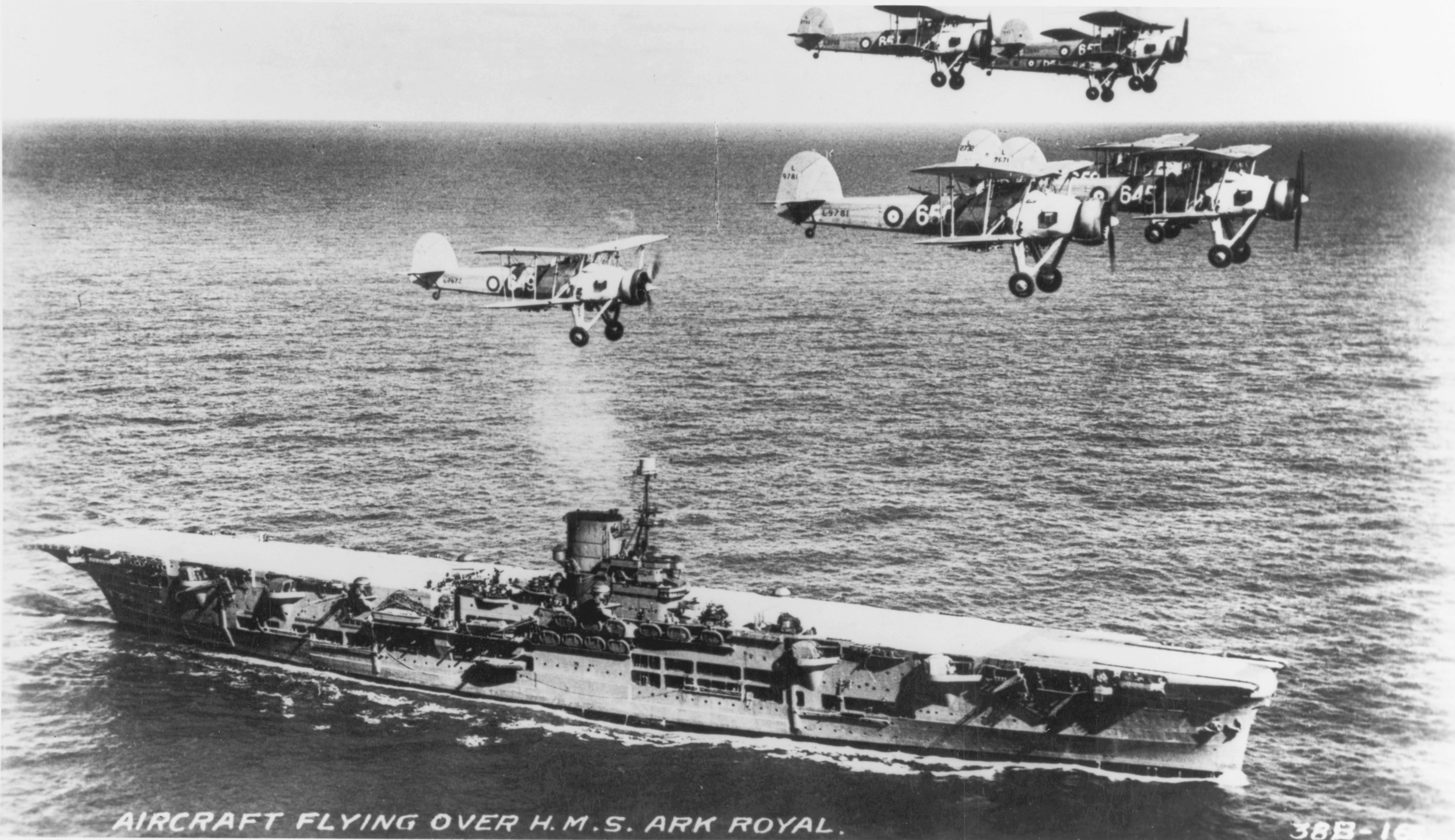
HMS Ark Royal in 1939, with Swordfish of 820 Naval Air Squadron passing overhead.

Ship	Aircraft	Displacement	Propulsion	Service		
Ship	Aircraft	Displacement	Propulsion	Laid down	Commissioned	Fate
HMS Ark Royal (91)	54	27,720 long tons (28,165 t)	6 Admiralty 3-drum boilers, 3 shafts, Parsons geared turbines: max. speed 30-31 kn	16 September 1935	16 December 1938	Sunk 14 November 1941 by German submarine U-81, off Gibraltar.

=== HMS Unicorn ===
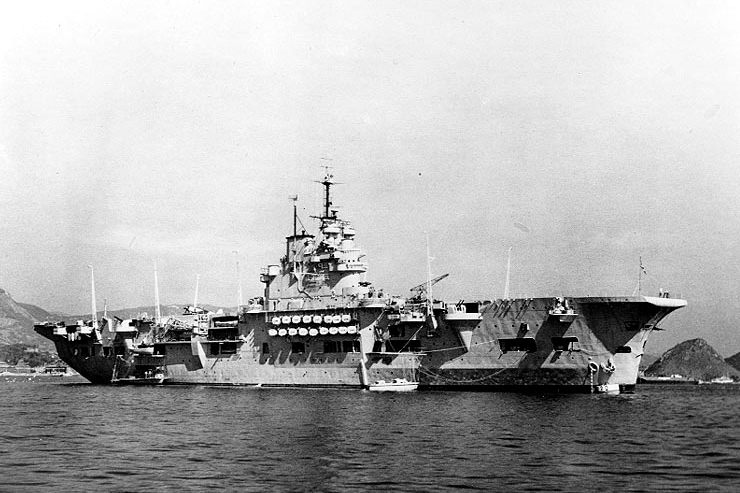
HMS Unicorn 1951

HMS Unicorn was an aircraft repair ship and light aircraft carrier; an "aircraft maintenance carrier".

Ship	Aircraft	Displacement	Propulsion	Service		
Ship	Aircraft	Displacement	Propulsion	Laid down	Commissioned	Fate
HMS Unicorn (I72)	35	20,300 long tons (20,626 t)	4 Admiralty 3-drum boilers; 4 Parsons geared steam turbines, 4 shafts: max. speed 24 kn	26 June 1939	12 March 1943	Sold for scrap 1960

=== Illustrious class ===
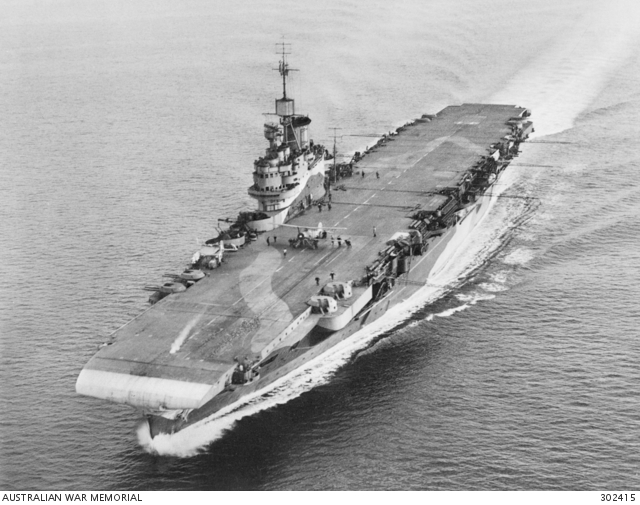
HMS Illustrious

Ship	Aircraft	Displacement	Propulsion	Service		
Ship	Aircraft	Displacement	Propulsion	Laid down	Commissioned	Fate
HMS Illustrious (87)	36	23,000 long tons (23,369 t)	6 Admiralty 3-drum boilers, 3 shafts, Parsons geared turbines	27 April 1937	25 May 1940	Sold for scrap 1956
HMS Formidable (R67)	40	23,000 long tons (23,369 t)	6 Admiralty 3-drum boilers, 3 shafts, Parsons geared turbines	17 June 1937	24 November 1940	Sold for scrap 1956
HMS Victorious (R38)	36	23,000 long tons (23,369 t)	6 Admiralty 3-drum boilers, 3 shafts, Parsons geared turbines	4 May 1937	14 May 1941	Sold for scrap 1969
HMS Indomitable (R92)	45	23,000 long tons (23,369 t)	6 Admiralty 3-drum boilers, 3 shafts, Parsons geared turbines	10 November 1937	10 October 1941	Sold for scrap 1955

=== Implacable class ===
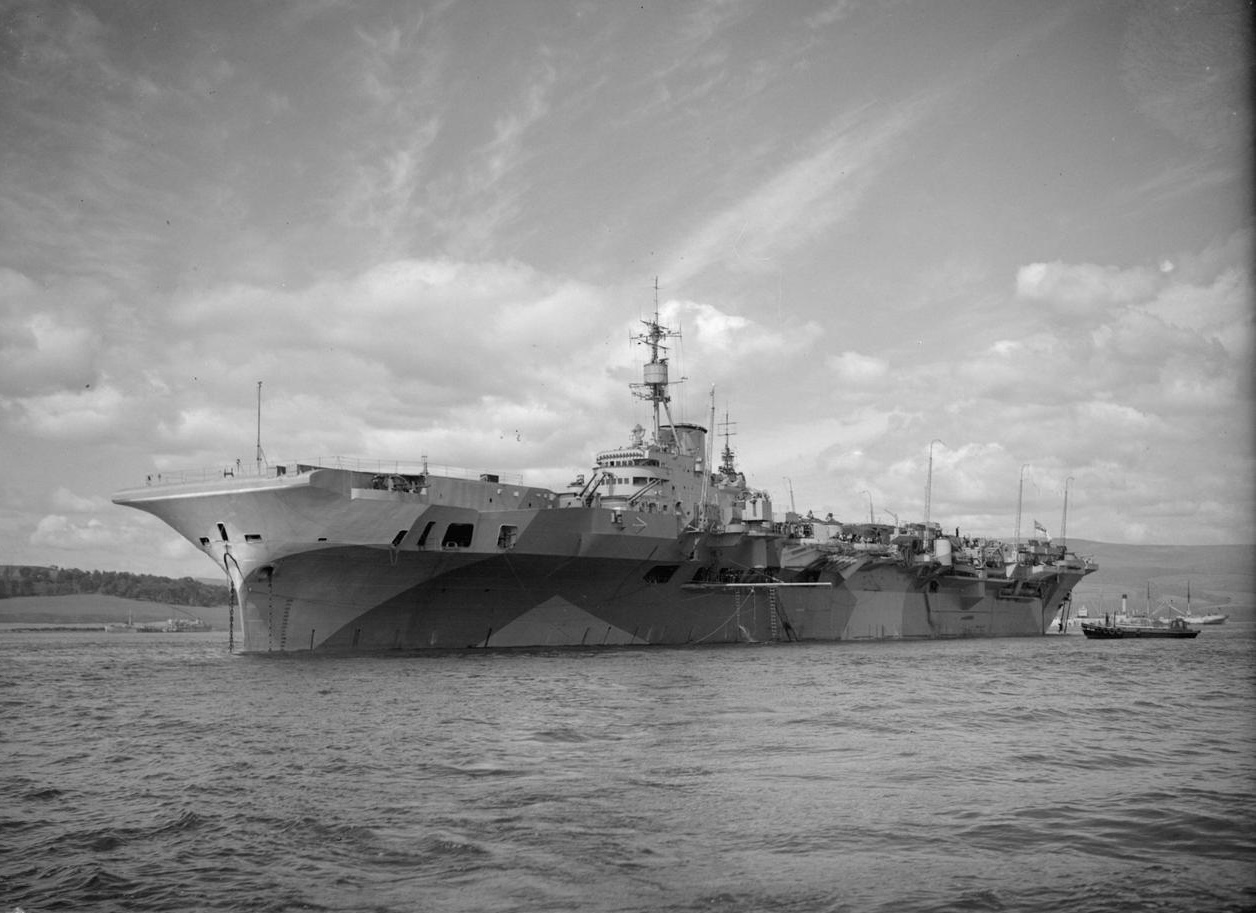
HMS Implacable 1944

Ship	Aircraft	Displacement	Propulsion	Service		
Ship	Aircraft	Displacement	Propulsion	Laid down	Commissioned	Fate
HMS Implacable (R86)	54	32,624 long tons (33,148 t)	8 Admiralty 3-drum boilers, 4 shafts, Parsons geared turbines	21 February 1939	28 August 1944	Sold for scrap 1955
HMS Indefatigable (R10)	54	32,624 long tons (33,148 t)	8 Admiralty 3-drum boilers, 4 shafts, Parsons geared turbines	3 November 1939	3 May 1944	Sold for scrap November 1956

=== Colossus class ===
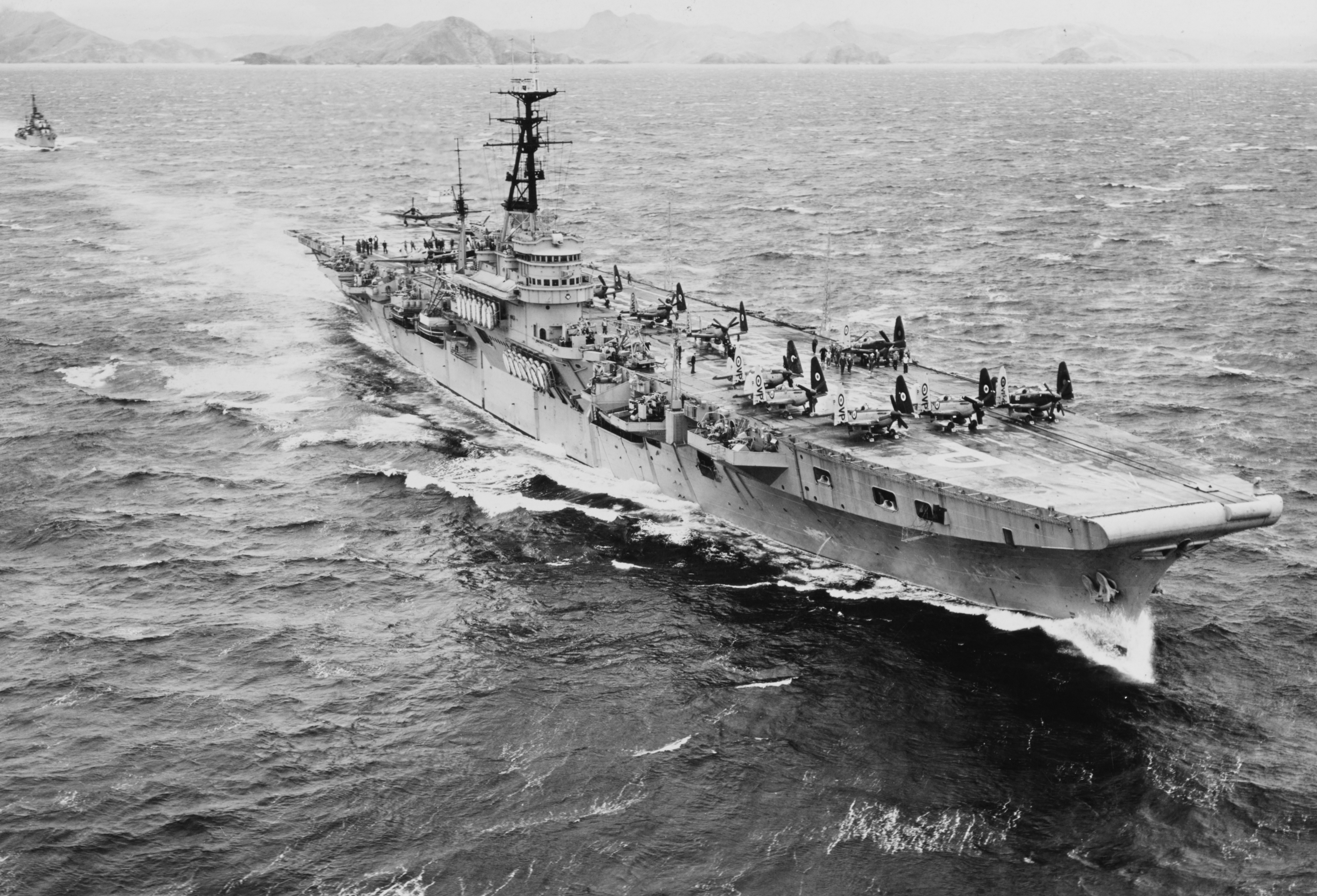
HMS Triumph 1950

The 1942 Design Light Fleet Carriers were designed and constructed by civilian shipyards to serve as an intermediate step between the expensive, full-size fleet aircraft carriers and the less expensive but limited-capability escort carriers. Perseus and Pioneer were modified to operate as maintenance carriers.

Ship	Aircraft	Displacement	Propulsion	Service		
Ship	Aircraft	Displacement	Propulsion	Laid down	Commissioned	Fate
HMS Colossus (R61)	48	18,330 long tons (18,624 t)	4 Admiralty 3-drum boilers, 2 shafts, Parsons geared turbines	1 June 1942	16 December 1944	Loaned to France as Arromanches from August 1946, then sold to France 1951
HMS Glory (R62)	48	18,330 long tons (18,624 t)	4 Admiralty 3-drum boilers, 2 shafts, Parsons geared turbines	27 August 1942	2 April 1945	Scrapped 1961
HMS Ocean (R68)	48	18,330 long tons (18,624 t)	4 Admiralty 3-drum boilers, 2 shafts, Parsons geared turbines	8 November 1942	8 August 1945	Scrapped 1962
HMS Theseus (R64)	48	18,330 long tons (18,624 t)	4 Admiralty 3-drum boilers, 2 shafts, Parsons geared turbines	6 January 1943	9 February 1946	Scrapped 1962
HMS Triumph (R16)	48	18,330 long tons (18,624 t)	4 Admiralty 3-drum boilers, 2 shafts, Parsons geared turbines	27 January 1943	9 May 1946	Scrapped 1981 in Spain
HMS Venerable (R63)	48	18,330 long tons (18,624 t)	4 Admiralty 3-drum boilers, 2 shafts, Parsons geared turbines	3 December 1942	17 January 1945	Sold to Netherlands 1948 and renamed Karel Doorman II then later sold in 1968 to Argentina as Veinticinco de Mayo. Scrapped 2000.
HMS Vengeance (R71)	48	18,330 long tons (18,624 t)	4 Admiralty 3-drum boilers, 2 shafts, Parsons geared turbines	16 November 1942	15 January 1945	Transferred to the Royal Australian Navy from 1953 to August 1955. Sold to Brazil as Minas Gerais December 1956. Scrapped 2004.
HMS Warrior (R31) ex-Brave	48	18,330 long tons (18,624 t)	4 Admiralty 3-drum boilers, 2 shafts, Parsons geared turbines	12 December 1942	November 1948	Loaned to Royal Canadian Navy 1946-48 and not commissioned into RN until November 1948. Returned to UK 1956 and modernised. Sold to Argentina as Independencia 1958.
HMS Perseus (R51) ex-Edgar	48	18,330 long tons (18,624 t)	4 Admiralty 3-drum boilers, 2 shafts, Parsons geared turbines	1 June 1942	19 October 1945	Scrapped 1958
HMS Pioneer (R76) ex-Ethalion ex-Mars	48	18,330 long tons (18,624 t)	4 Admiralty 3-drum boilers, 2 shafts, Parsons geared turbines	2 December 1942	8 February 1945	Scrapped 1954

=== Majestic class ===
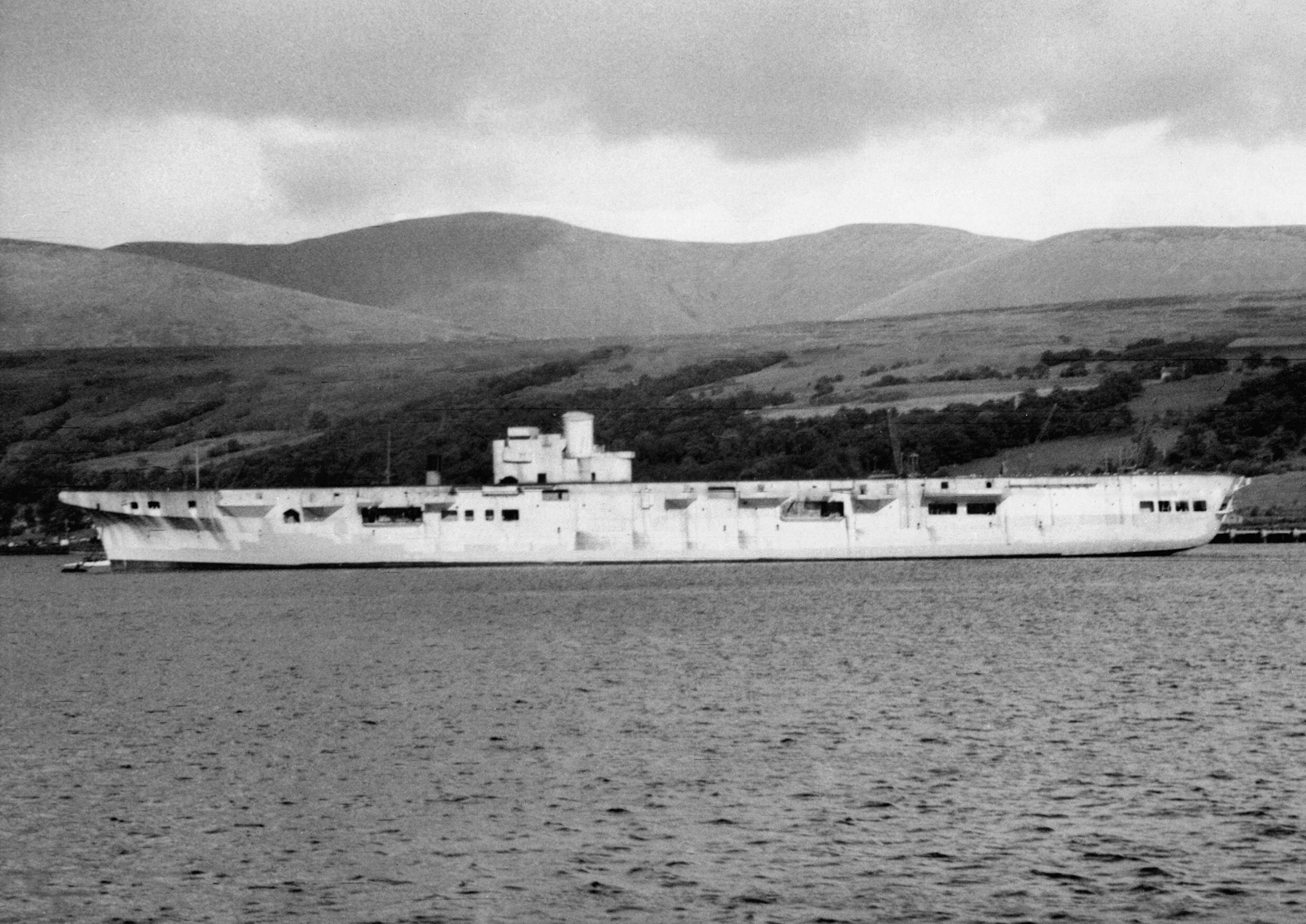
HMS Hercules

The 1942 design was modified to take more modern aircraft and these ships became the Majestic-class. Not completed until after the end of the war, most ended up purchased by other navies.

Ship	Aircraft	Displacement	Propulsion	Service		
Ship	Aircraft	Displacement	Propulsion	Laid down	Commissioned	Fate
HMS Majestic (R77)	37	18,085 long tons (18,375 t)	4 Admiralty 3-drum boilers, 2 shafts, Parsons geared turbines)	15 April 1943	28 October 1955	Sold to Australia in 1949, and completed in 1955 to a modified design including an angled flight deck and renamed as HMAS Melbourne. Sold for scrap in February 1985 to China United Shipbuilding Co. Ltd., Dalian, China.
HMS Hercules (R49)	37	18,085 long tons (18,375 t)	4 Admiralty 3-drum boilers, 2 shafts, Parsons geared turbines)	October 1943	4 March 1961	Laid up till purchased by India in January 1957, renamed INS Vikrant, commissioned 1961, decommissioned 1997, scrapped 2014.
HMS Leviathan (R97)	37	18,085 long tons (18,375 t)	4 Admiralty 3-drum boilers, 2 shafts, Parsons geared turbines)	October 1943		Never completed scrapped 1968
HMS Magnificent (R36)	37	18,085 long tons (18,375 t)	4 Admiralty 3-drum boilers, 2 shafts, Parsons geared turbines)	July 1943	7 April 1948	Loaned to Royal Canadian Navy upon completion in 1948. Commissioned in RCN March 1948, returned to Royal Navy 1957 and scrapped 1965
HMS Powerful (R95)		18,985 long tons (19,290 t)	4 Admiralty 3-drum boilers, 2 shafts, Parsons geared turbines)	November 1943	17 January 1957	Sold to Canada on 23 April 1952, then completed to a modified design with an angled flight deck and renamed HMCS Bonaventure and broken up in 1971
HMS Terrible (R93)	37	18,085 long tons (18,375 t)	4 Admiralty 3-drum boilers, 2 shafts, Parsons geared turbines)	19 November 1943	16 December 1948	Transferred to Royal Australian Navy as HMAS Sydney 1948. Sold for scrap on 28 October 1975 to Dongkuk Steel Mill Co. Ltd., Seoul, South Korea

=== Audacious class ===
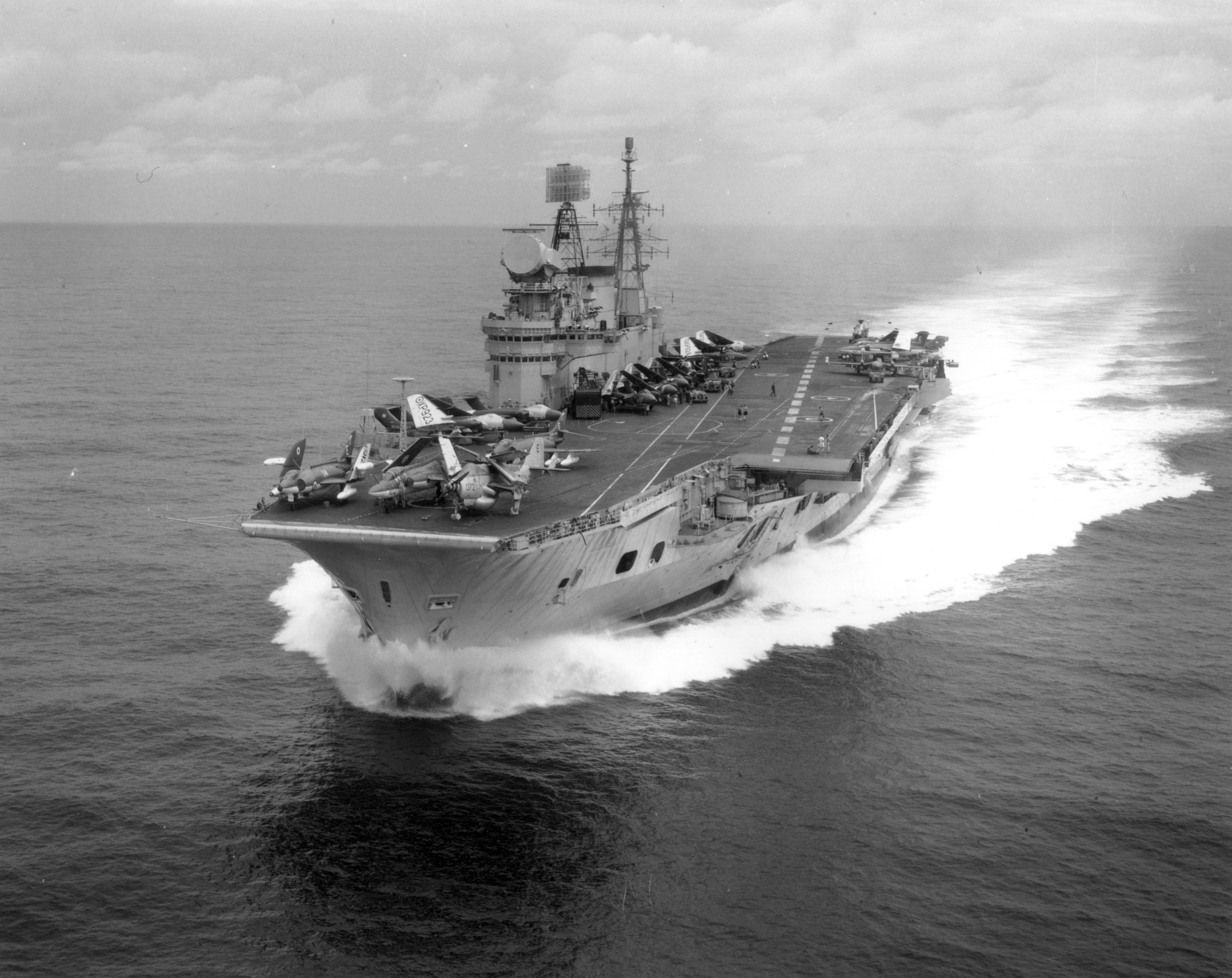
HMS Eagle

Ship	Aircraft	Displacement	Propulsion	Service		
Ship	Aircraft	Displacement	Propulsion	Laid down	Commissioned	Fate
HMS Eagle (R05) ex-Audacious	60+	49,950 long tons (50,752 t)	8 Admiralty 3-drum boilers, 4 shafts, Parsons SR geared turbines	24 October 1942	5 October 1951	Sold for scrap 1978
HMS Ark Royal (R09) ex-Irresistible	50	53,950 long tons (54,816 t)	8 Admiralty 3-drum boilers, 4 shafts, Parsons SR geared turbines	3 May 1943	25 February 1955	Sold for scrap 1980
HMS Eagle	60+	49,950 long tons (50,752 t)	8 Admiralty 3-drum boilers, 4 shafts, Parsons SR geared turbines	19 April 1944		Cancelled January 1946 when 23% complete. Scrapped on slip.
HMS Africa						Cancelled

=== Centaur class ===
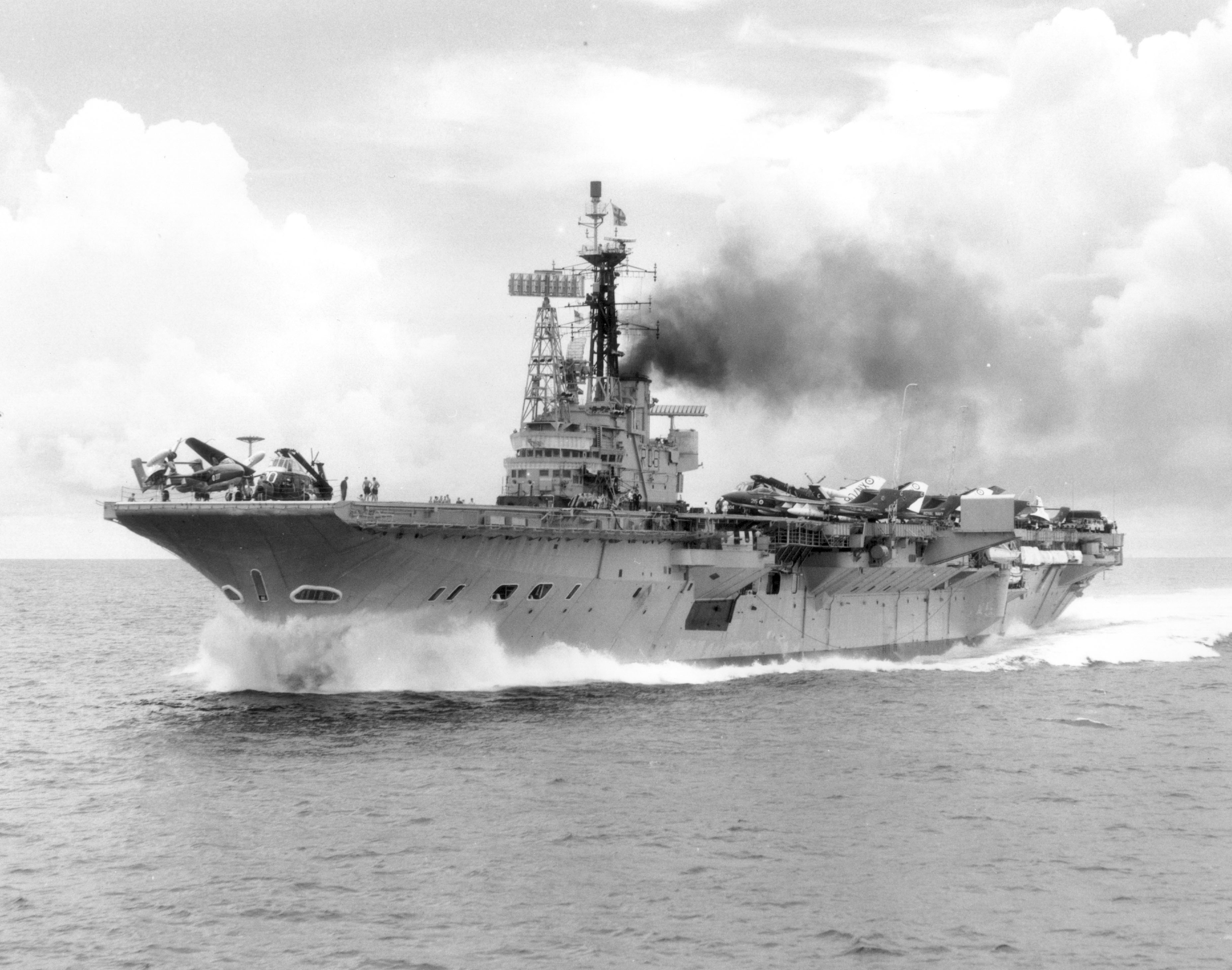
HMS Centaur

Ship	Aircraft	Displacement	Propulsion	Service		
Ship	Aircraft	Displacement	Propulsion	Laid down	Commissioned	Fate
HMS Centaur (R06)	42	26,200 long tons (26,620 t)	4 Admiralty 3-drum boilers, 2 shafts, Parsons geared turbines	30 May 1944	1 September 1953	Scrapped 1972
HMS Albion (R07)	42	27,800 long tons (28,246 t)	4 Admiralty 3-drum boilers, 2 shafts, Parsons geared turbines	23 March 1944	May 1954	Scrapped November 1973
HMS Bulwark (R08)	42	26,200 long tons (26,620 t)	4 Admiralty 3-drum boilers, 2 shafts, Parsons geared turbines	10 May 1945	29 October 1954	Scrapped April 1984
HMS Hermes (R12) ex-Elephant	42	27,800 long tons (28,246 t)	4 Admiralty 3-drum boilers, 2 shafts, Parsons geared turbines	21 June 1944	November 1959	Sold to India April 1986, as INS Viraat, decommissioned.
HMS Hermes	42	27,800 long tons (28,246 t)	4 Admiralty 3-drum boilers, 2 shafts, Parsons geared turbines	21 June 1944		Cancelled October 1945, scrapped on slip.
HMS Arrogant	42	27,800 long tons (28,246 t)	4 Admiralty 3-drum boilers, 2 shafts, Parsons geared turbines	1944		Cancelled October 1945, scrapped on slip.
HMS Monmouth						Cancelled
HMS Polyphemus						Cancelled

=== Malta class ===
Ship	Aircraft	Displacement	Propulsion	Fate
HMS Malta	80	56,800 long tons (57,711 t)	4 or 5 x shafts Steam turbines 8 x boilers	Cancelled 13 December 1945
HMS New Zealand	80	56,800 long tons (57,711 t)	4 or 5 x shafts Steam turbines 8 x boilers	Cancelled 13 December 1945
HMS Gibraltar	80	56,800 long tons (57,711 t)	4 or 5 x shafts Steam turbines 8 x boilers	Cancelled 13 December 1945
HMS Africa	80	56,800 long tons (57,711 t)	4 or 5 x shafts Steam turbines 8 x boilers	Cancelled 13 December 1945

=== Queen Elizabeth class (CVA-01) ===
Ship	Aircraft	Displacement	Propulsion	
Ship	Aircraft	Displacement	Propulsion	Fate
CVA-01 (possible name HMS Queen Elizabeth)	50	54,500 long tons (55,375 t)	3 x shafts Parsons turbines 6 boilers	Cancelled 1966
HMS Duke of Edinburgh (Possibly)	50	54,500 long tons (55,375 t)	3 x shafts Parsons turbines 6 boilers	Cancelled 1963
HMS Prince of Wales (Possibly)	50	54,500 long tons (55,375 t)	3 x shafts Parsons turbines 6 boilers	Cancelled 1963

=== Invincible class ===
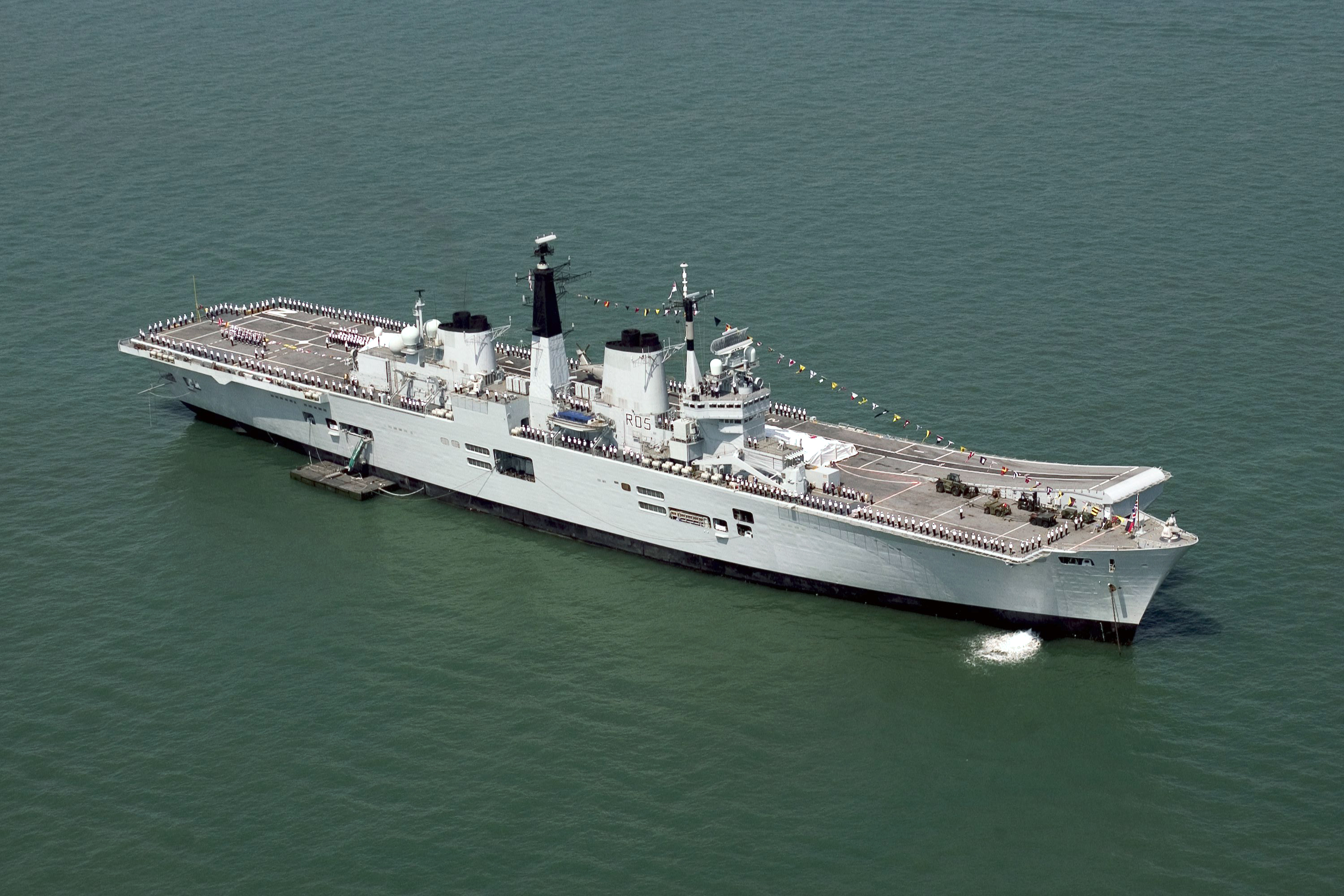
HMS Invincible

Ship	Aircraft	Displacement	Propulsion	Service		
Ship	Aircraft	Displacement	Propulsion	Laid down	Commissioned	Fate
HMS Invincible (R05)	22	22,000 long tons (22,353 t)	4 Olympus gas turbine engines combined gas and gas, 2 Shafts	July 1973	July 1980	Sold for scrap 2010
HMS Illustrious (R06)	22	22,000 long tons (22,353 t)	4 Olympus gas turbine engines combined gas and gas, 2 Shafts	October 1976	June 1982	Sold for scrap 2016
HMS Ark Royal (R07) ex-Indomitable	22	20,000 long tons (20,321 t)	4 Olympus gas turbine engines combined gas and gas, 2 Shafts	December 1978	1 July 1985	Sold for scrap 2012

=== Queen Elizabeth class ===
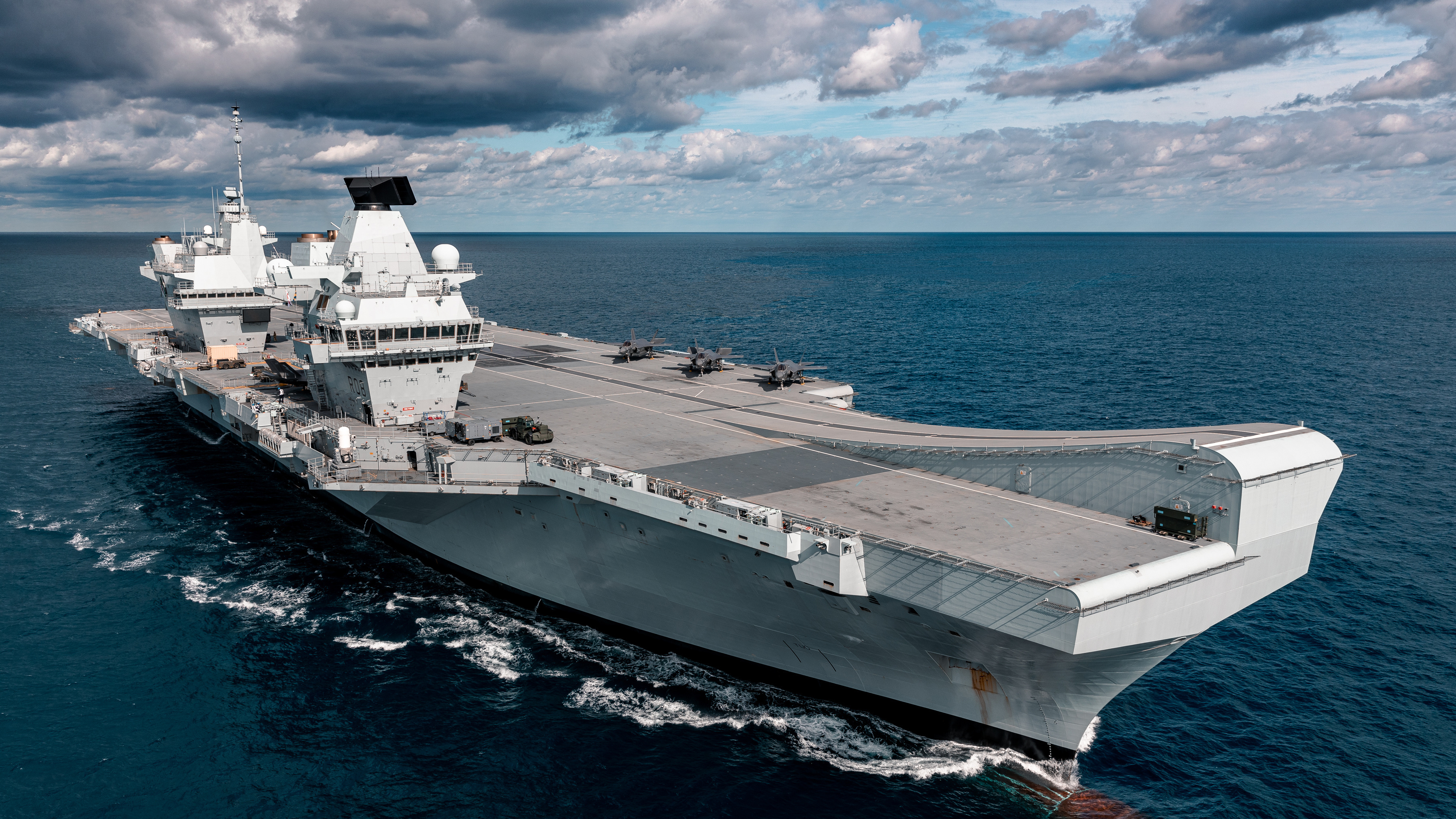
HMS Queen Elizabeth

Ship	Aircraft	Displacement	Propulsion	Service		
Ship	Aircraft	Displacement	Propulsion	Laid down	Commissioned	Fate
HMS Queen Elizabeth (R08)	50	Est. 80,600 tonnes (79,300 long tons; 88,800 short tons) Full Load	2 x Rolls-Royce MT30 Gas Turbines	7 July 2009	7 December 2017	Active
HMS Prince of Wales (R09)	50	Est. 80,600 tonnes (79,300 long tons; 88,800 short tons) Full Load	2 x Rolls-Royce MT30 Gas Turbines	26 May 2011	10 December 2019	Active

== See also ==
- Timeline of aircraft carriers of the Royal Navy
- List of escort carriers of the Royal Navy
- List of seaplane carriers of the Royal Navy
- Aircraft maintenance carriers of the Royal Navy
- List of aircraft carriers in service
- List of sunken aircraft carriers
