= 7th Carrier Air Group =

Royal Navy Fleet Air Arm Carrier Air Group

- White Ensign
- Active: 30 June 1945 - 23 March 1946; 7 December 1950 - 1 June 1951
- Country: United Kingdom
- Branch: Royal Navy
- Type: Carrier Air Group
- Size: 3 x fighter squadron; 1 x TBR squadron
- Part of: Fleet Air Arm
- Formed for: Implacable-class aircraft carrier
- Engagements: World War II: Pacific War; Air raids on Japan

The 7th Carrier Air Group (7th CAG) was a Fleet Air Arm (FAA) carrier air group of the Royal Navy (RN). It was last active between 1950 and 1951 as the 7th Night Air Group embarked in the Colossus-class light aircraft carrier, HMS Vengeance

It was initially formed in June 1945, at HMS Nabthorpe, a Royal Navy Mobile Operational Naval Air Base (MONAB) at the Royal Australian Air Force (RAAF) base RAAF Station Schofields situated at Schofields, New South Wales, in Australia. The unit was allocated to the Implacable-class aircraft carrier HMS Indefatigable as part of the British Pacific Fleet.

== Naval Air Squadrons ==
7th Carrier Air Group consisted of a number of squadrons of the Fleet Air Arm.

Squadron	Aircraft	From	To
820 Naval Air Squadron	Grumman Avenger Mk.II	June 1945	March 1946
887 Naval Air Squadron	Supermarine Seafire F Mk.III, L Mk.III	June 1945	March 1946
894 Naval Air Squadron	Supermarine Seafire L Mk.III	June 1945	March 1946
1700 Naval Air Squadron	Fairey Firefly I	June 1945	July 1945
1772 Naval Air Squadron	Fairey Firefly I	July 1945	March 1946
809 Naval Air Squadron	de Havilland Sea Hornet NF.21	December 1950	June 1951
814 Naval Air Squadron	Fairey Firefly FR.I, AS.Mk 6	December 1950	June 1951

== History ==
The squadrons of the Fleet Air Arm, embarked in the Royal Navy’s Fleet and Light Fleet aircraft carriers, were organized into Air Groups in alignment with United States Navy policy following the conclusion of World War II in Europe. This reorganisation aimed to facilitate operations in the Pacific Theater against Japanese forces in 1945. The two vessels of the Implacable class were designated to Carrier Air Groups seven through ten. Each ship was equipped with two squadrons of twenty-four Supermarine Seafire aircraft, alongside one squadron of fifteen Grumman Avengers and another squadron of fifteen Fairey Fireflys.

=== 1945-1946 ===
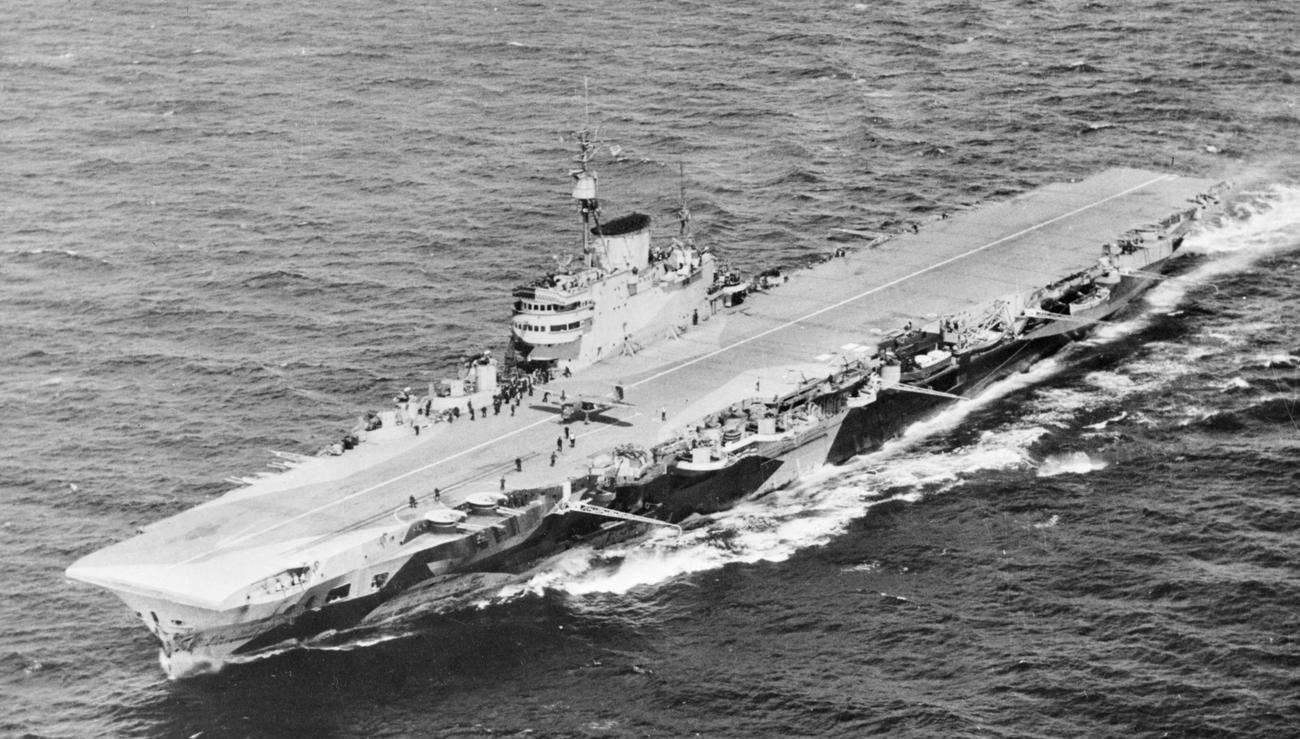
HMS Indefatigable, underway at sea

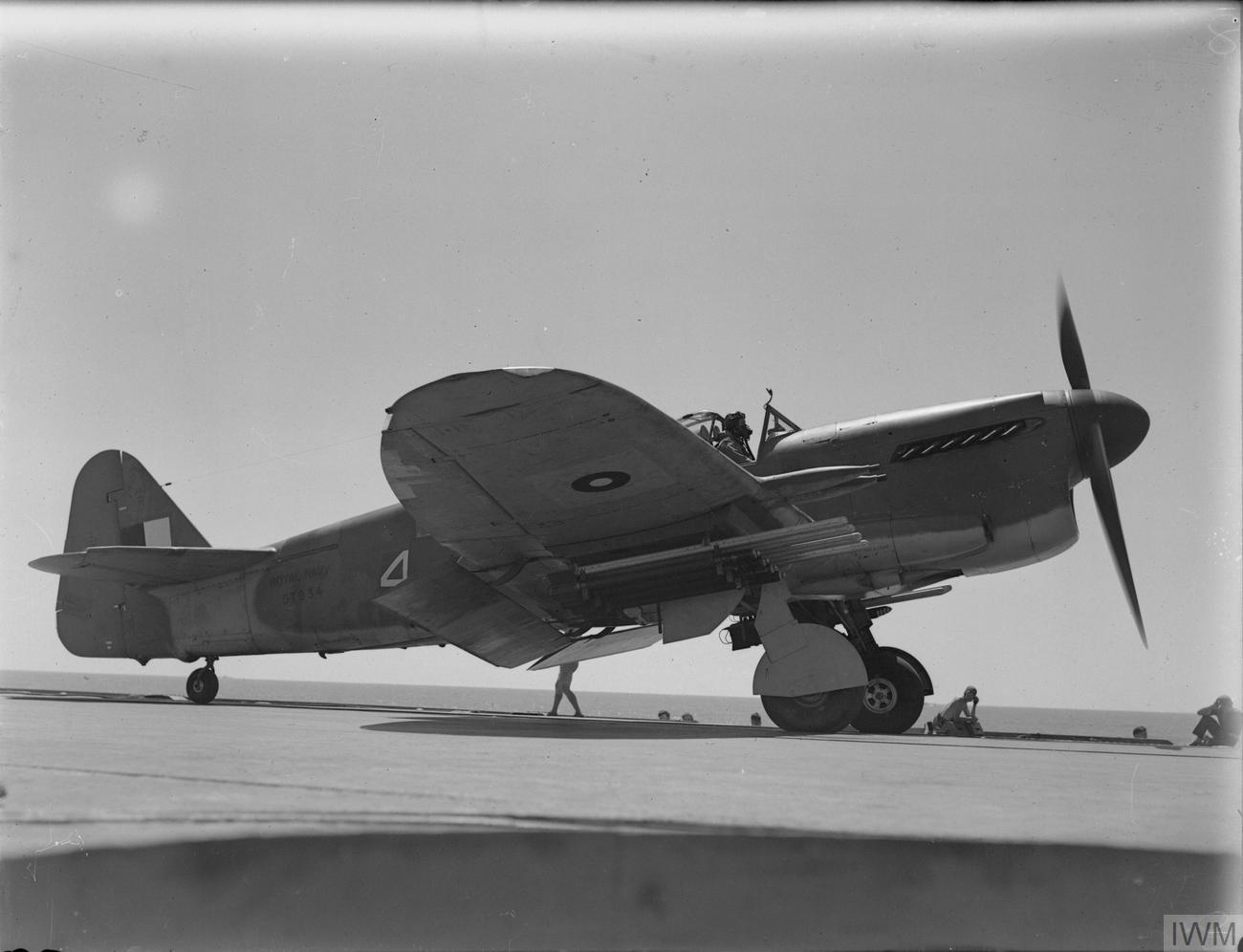
Fairey Firefly of 1770 Squadron, about to take off from HMS Indefatigable, an example of the type also used by 1772 Squadron

The 7th Carrier Air Group was formed on 30 June 1945, HMS Nabthorpe, a Royal Navy MONAB located at RAAF Station Schofields, in Australia. The 7th CAG was assigned to the Implacable-class aircraft carrier, HMS Indefatigable, for service in the British Pacific Fleet. It was made up of 820 Naval Air Squadron, which operated Grumman Avenger, an American torpedo bomber aircraft, 1770 Naval Air Squadron which flew Fairey Firefly, a carrier-borne fighter and anti-submarine aircraft and the squadrons from the 24th Naval Fighter Wing: 887 Naval Air Squadron and 894 Naval Air Squadron, both of which were equipped with Supermarine Seafire, a navalised version of the Supermarine Spitfire fighter aircraft.

As a result of the pressures associated with extended operations, it was decided to relieve 1770 Naval Air Squadron from frontline responsibilities, with the newly arrived 1772 Naval Air Squadron, which had been undergoing training in Australia since late March, taking their position.

==== Mainland Japan strikes ====
The air groups squadrons embarked in HMS Indefatigable on the 7 July and the carrier sailed for Manus. On 20 July, the carrier joined the British Pacific Fleet after their first series of attacks on Japan, during the initial full replenishment period. A replenishment and refuelling period, initially scheduled from 20 to 23 July, was moved forward to 19 July because of adverse weather conditions. The weather continued to be unfavourable for the resumption of flying operations until 24 July. At this time, large external fuel tanks were now being used by the CAG's Supermarine Seafire aircraft, therefore, were now no longer limited to combat air patrol (CAP) due to restricted range.

The second series of airstrikes on Mainland Japan occurred from 24 to 25 July.

On 24 July, airstrike '2D' constituted a Ramrod mission involving twelve Supermarine Seafires that were deployed from HMS Indefatigable to engage targets located at Takamatsu and Kanonji. Airstrike '3' represented a subsequent combined strike, which included eight Supermarine Seafires serving as escorts from the air group. Airstrike '4' marked a third combined strike, featuring sixteen Supermarine Seafires alongside eight Fairey Fireflies launched from the carrier. On this date, HMS Indefatigable's Supermarine Seafires participated in ground attack operations for the first time, with twelve Seafires undertaking a Ramrod mission aimed at targets in Takamatsu and Kanonji. In this capacity, they were equipped with 2 x 250 lb (110 kg) bombs, with a single bomb mounted under each wing.

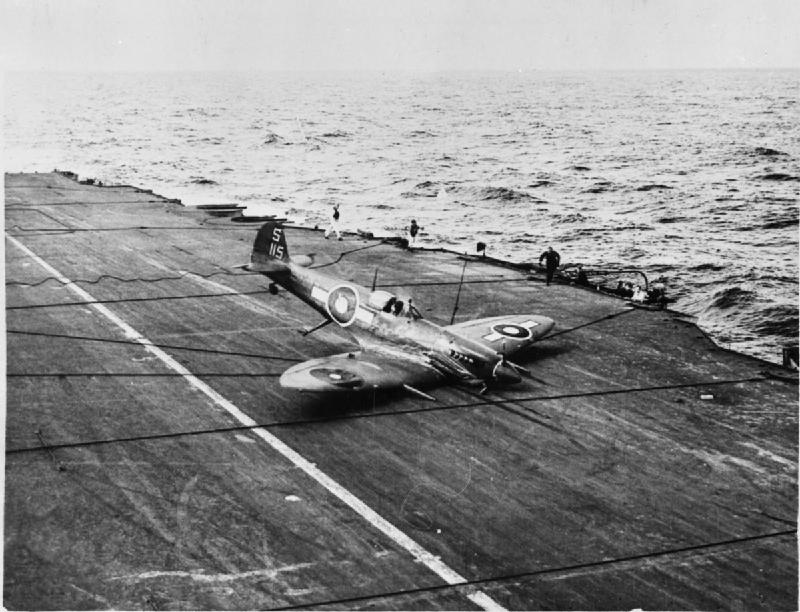
A Supermarine Seafire belly landing, whose undercarriage was damaged during on operation against the Japanese, on board HMS Indefatigable

On 25 July, airstrike '2D', which comprised twelve Supermarine Seafires from the air group, was aborted due to adverse weather conditions upon making landfall. A significant deck crash transpired on HMS Indefatigable when Sub-Lieutenant Gall of 894 Squadron breached the barrier and collided with the island, resulting in the tail swinging and the barrier cables sliding up the aircraft, striking the pilot on the head. He succumbed to his injuries the following day. An additional replenishment period occurred from 26 to 27 July.

Series two airstrikes continued between 28 and 30 July.

On 28 July, airstrike '2D' comprised eight Supermarine Seafires from HMS Indefatigable targeting the Sato and Minato airfields. On 29 July, no air operations were planned; however, the subsequent day saw airstrike '2D' organised with eight Supermarine Seafires from the air group designated for anti-shipping operations in Nagoya Bay.

Following this, a replenishment phase took place from 31 July to 2 August. Adverse weather conditions resulted in the postponement of Series 3 of the airstrikes in mainland Japan. Initially planned for 5 August, the airstrikes were moved to 8 August, requiring an extra day for replenishment, which was conducted on 6 and 7 August.

The third wave of airstrikes on mainland Japan took place between August 8 and August 10.

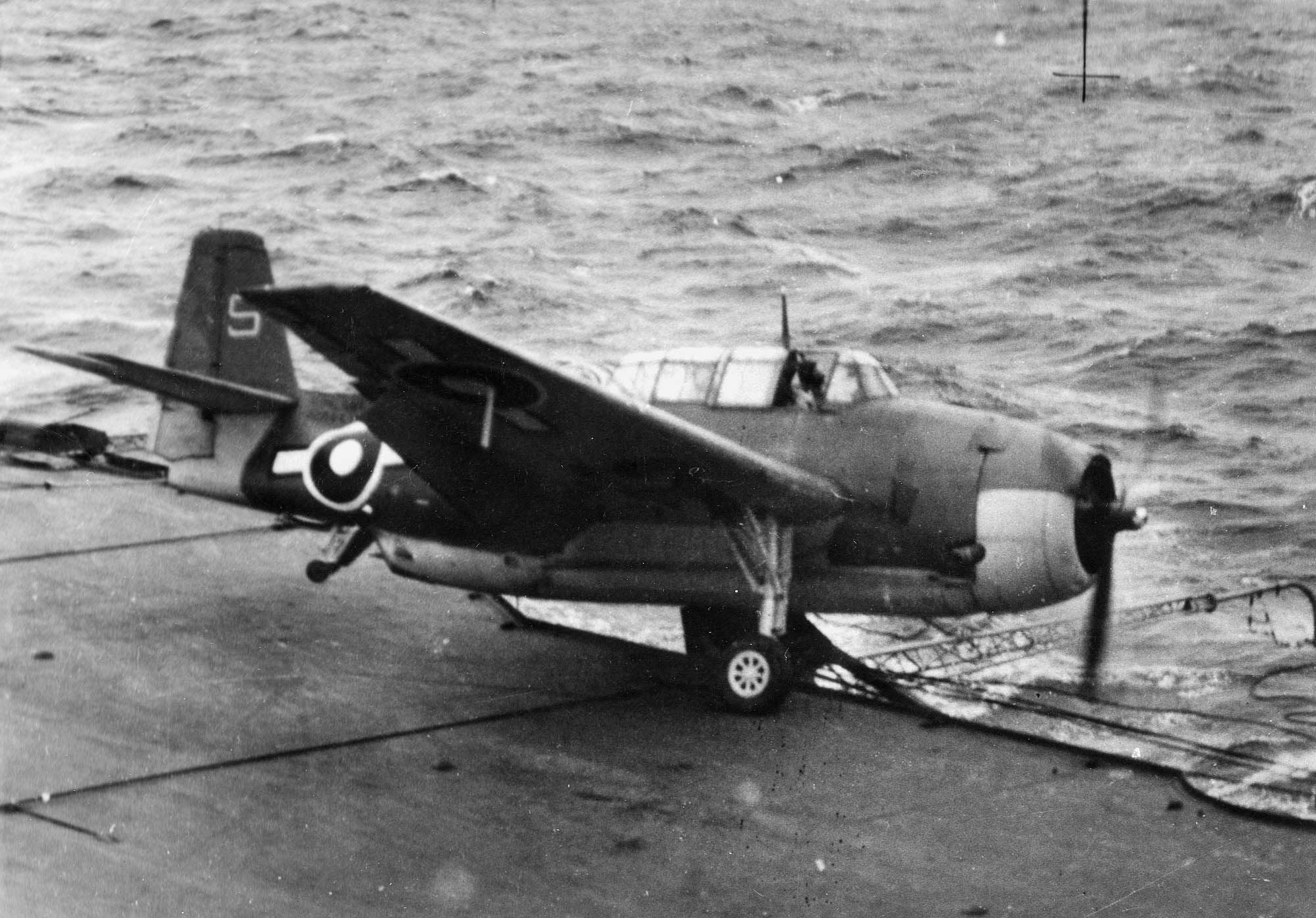
Grumman Avenger from 820 Squadron, going over the edge of the deck of HMS Indefatigable

On the morning of 9 August, airstrike '2D' was composed of nine Supermarine Seafires launched from the carrier, targeting the airfields at Kesennuma, Kakuda and Hachinohe. 10 August was designated as the concluding day of strikes prior to the withdrawal of TF 37, the British Pacific Fleet, to Australia for a scheduled maintenance and replenishment period. Airstrike '2D' comprised eight Supermarine Seafires from HMS Indefatigable, focusing on targets in the Msuda region. Replenishment took place on 11 August.

On 12 August, Task Force 37 was disbanded, and the majority of the British Pacific Fleet set sail for Manus, subsequently proceeding to Sydney; the remaining forces were now integrated into the United States Navy's Task Force 38 and reclassified as Task Group 38.5, therefore, HMS Indefatigable and the carrier air group remained as part of an occupation force and the group and was involved in strikes around Tokyo just before V-J Day.

The third wave of air attacks continued on 13 August.

HMS Indefatigable deployed Supermarine Seafires for combat air patrol operations prior to launching aircraft for the initial strike of the day targeting airfields and air installations in the Tokyo region, extending as far north as the Sendai area. A subsequent strike was later initiated but was called off upon reaching the coastline due to the targets being hidden by adverse weather conditions. Replenishment occurred the following day.

Wave four of the attacks on Mainland Japan took place on 15 August.

HMS Indefatigable deployed a formation comprising four Fairey Fireflies and six Grumman Avengers, accompanied by eight Supermarine Seafires for the initial assault; however, the intended target, Kisarazu Air Field, but poor weather meant it had to instead attack a secondary target. The group was then attacked by a number of Mitsubishi A6M Zero aircraft and the Japanese fighters shot down one Supermarine Seafire on their first pass and crippled a Grumman Avenger.

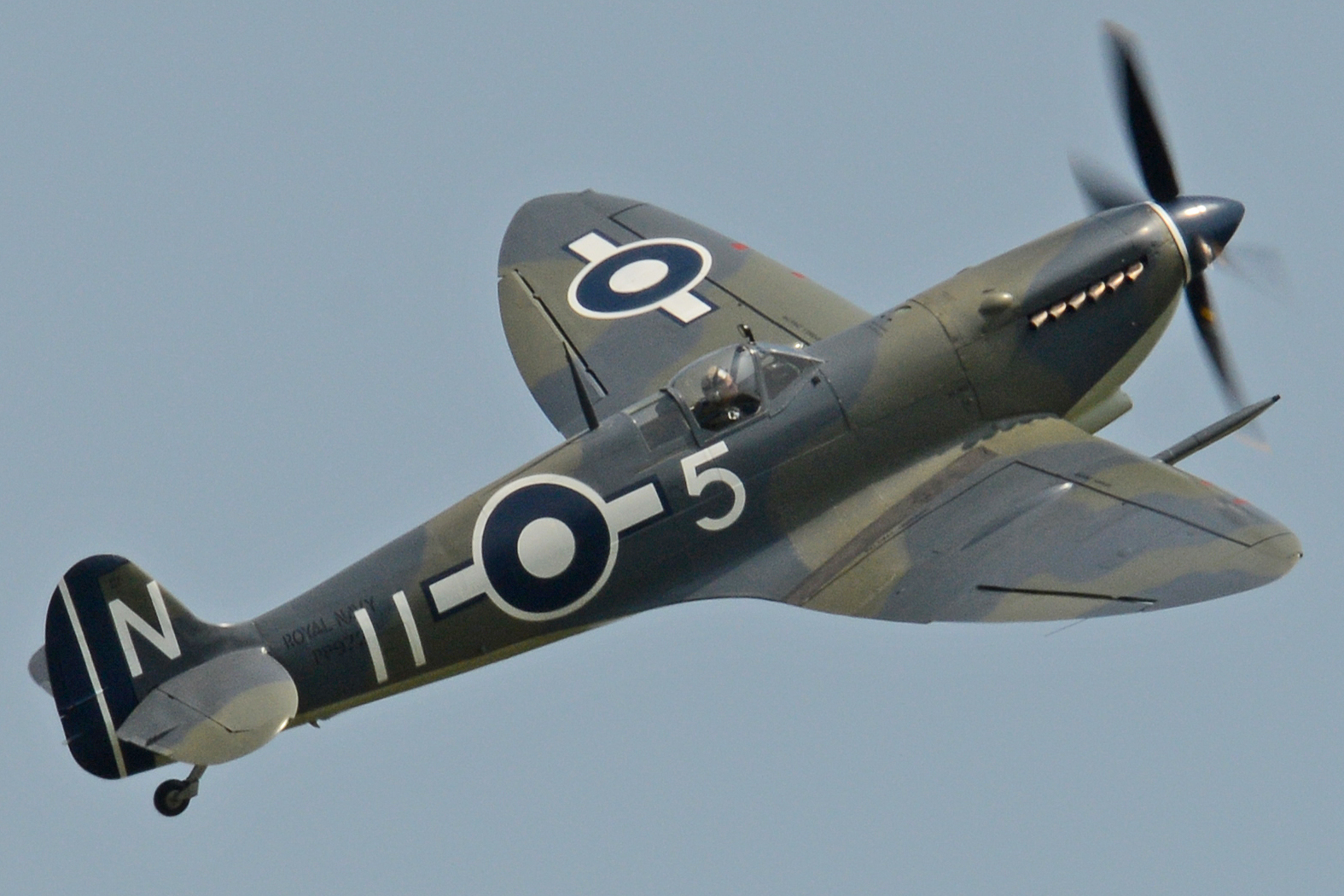
Supermarine Seafire LF Mk.IIIc; seen in 880 Squadron British Pacific Fleet markings but an example of the type used by 887 and 894 Squadrons

Sub Lieutenant Fred Hockley, RNVR, was leading five Supermarine Seafire aircraft from 894 Squadron which was tasked, along with three 887 Squadron Supermarine Seafire aircraft, led by Sub Lieutenant Victor Lowden, RNVR, with defending Fairey Firefly and Grumman Avenger bomber aircraft from the CAG. The target changed to a chemical factory at Odaki Bay, south of Tokyo, and the formation was attacked from behind by a number of Mitsubishi A6M Zero aircraft.

Hockley's radio had failed, therefore, did not hear any warning call and as lead aircraft, was unable to see his formation break. His aircraft was hit and he bailed out of his Supermarine Seafire. Fred Hockley surrendered, however, he was executed by Japanese forces after capture.

From the remaining Supermarine Seafires of 894 Squadron, Sub Lieutenant D.N. Duncan, RNVR, engaged two enemy aircraft; one descended in flames at a near-vertical angle, while another was likely destroyed. Sub Lieutenant R.C. Kay, RNVR, successfully severed the tail of one Mitsubishi A6M Zero and inflicted damage on another. However, Sub Lieutenant R.A. Gorvin, RNVR, sustained damage during the engagement with the Mitsubishi A6M Zeros over Odaki Bay but was able to land safely.

An 887 Naval Air Squadron Supermarine Seafire aircraft, serial number NN212, flown by Sub Lieutenant G.J. Murphy, RN, shot down two Japanese Mitsubishi A6M Zeros. Sub Lieutenant Lowden, RNVR, leading the formation of three aircraft from 887 Squadron engaged with four Mitsubishi A6M Zero fighters over Odaki Bay. Two of the Japenese aircraft were destroyed, one of which was credited jointly with Sub Lieutenant W.I. Williams, RNVR, while another was observed descending in a trail of smoke. By the conclusion of the engagement, pilots of the Supermarine Seafire aircraft reported having shot down four Mitsubishi A6M Zeros, with an additional four likely shot down and another four reported as damaged. Furthermore, a crew from a Grumman Avenger also asserted that they had damaged one Mitsubishi A6M Zero.

The 7th Carrier Air Group lost one Supermarine Seafire aircraft and one Grumman Avenger aircraft. The damaged Grumman Avenger deliberately ditched next to a destroyer on the return journey. Victor Lowden was the last to land his Supermarine Seafire on the return to HMS Indefatigable. He was credited with two Mitsubishi A6M Zero aircraft destroyed, one shared and two damaged. He was awarded the Distinguished Service Cross for his actions over Tokyo Bay.

This marked the final British aerial engagement of the conflict; A directive was issued to halt all air assault operations, and shortly thereafter, it was confirmed that Japan had accepted the terms of surrender set forth by the Allies. HMS Indefatigable's air group continued to fly combat air patrols and also flew reconnaissance missions looking for Allied prisoners of war (POWs), dropping supplies to them as they were located.

The flying operations continued until the group entered Sagami Bay on 5 September. They departed three days later for Australia, where the aircraft carrier had a refit. Upon arriving at the coast of New South Wales, her squadrons departed prior to entering the harbor; 887, 894, and 1772 Naval Air Squadrons proceeded to RNAS Schofield (HMS Nabthorpe), while 820 Squadron was directed to RNAS Nowra (HMS Nabbington).

The aircraft carrier and its air group returned to the United Kingdom, via New Zealand, Australia again and also South Africa. The aircraft carrier and its air group arrived at HMNB Portsmouth on the 16 March 1946 and the 7th Carrier Air Group disbanded on 23 March.

=== 1950-1951 ===
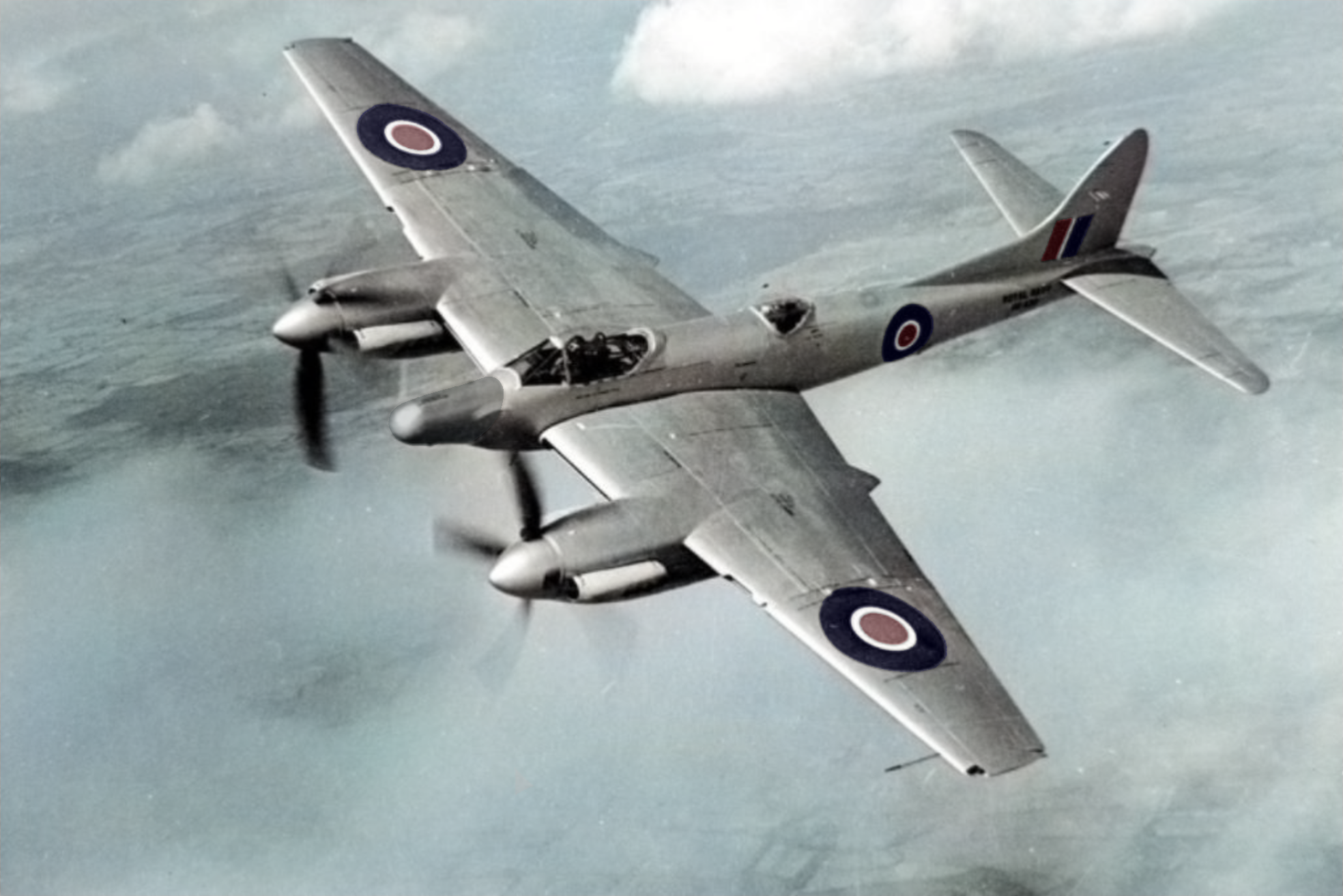
de Havilland Sea Hornet NF.21; an example of the type used by 809 Squadron

On the 7 December 1950, the group reformed, but was known as the 7th Night Air Group. It was assigned to the Colossus-class light aircraft carrier, HMS Vengeance and was made up of 809 Naval Air Squadron, which operated de Havilland Hornet, a twin-engine fighter aircraft, and 814 Naval Air Squadron, which was equipped with Fairey Firefly, a carrier-borne fighter and anti-submarine aircraft.

814 Naval Air Squadron was awarded the Boyd Trophy for its high standard of operational efficiency, night flying with the Fairey Firefly aircraft whilst deployed onboard HMS Vengeance, in 1951.

The night air group approach was deemed unsuccessful, only lasting for six months. The group disbanded on the 1 June 1951.

=== Aircraft carriers ===
Aircraft carriers which the 7th Carrier Air Group was assigned to:

- HMS Indefatigable (June 1945 - March 1946)
- HMS Vengeance (December 1950 - June 1951)

=== Aircraft used ===
Aircraft used by the naval air squadrons that formed the 7th Carrier Air Group from 1945 to 1946 and between 1950 and 1951:

- Grumman Avenger, an American torpedo bomber
- Supermarine Seafire, a navalised version of the Supermarine Spitfire fighter aircraft for service on British aircraft carriers
- de Havilland Sea Hornet, a navalised version of the de Havilland Hornet fighter aircraft for service on British aircraft carriers
- Fairey Firefly, a carrier-borne fighter and anti-submarine aircraft

== Air Group Commanders ==
List of commanding officers of the 7th Carrier Air Group, with date of appointment:

1945 - 1946

- Lieutenant Commander N.G. Hallet, DSC, RN, from 30 June 1945
- disbanded - 23 March 1946

1950 - 1951

- Lieutenant Commander J.O. Armour, RN, from 7 December 1950
- none, from 17 April 1951
- disbanded - 1 June 1951

== See also ==
- List of Fleet Air Arm groups
- List of aircraft carriers of the Royal Navy
- List of aircraft of the Fleet Air Arm
- List of Fleet Air Arm aircraft in World War II
