= 24th Naval Fighter Wing =

Royal Navy Fleet Air Arm aircraft wing

- White Ensign
- Active: 25 October 1943 – 30 June 1945
- Country: United Kingdom
- Branch: Royal Navy
- Type: Naval fighter Wing
- Role: Fleet fighter; carrier air defence
- Size: Two squadrons
- Part of: Fleet Air Arm
- Aircraft carrier: HMS Indefatigable
- Engagements: World War II: European theatre of World War II; Operation Mascot; Operation Turbine; Operation Offspring; Operation Goodwood; Pacific War; Operation Meridian; Operation Meridian II; Operation Iceberg

Insignia
- Wing Code: H

Aircraft flown
- Fighter: Supermarine Seafire F Mk.IIc, F Mk.III & L Mk.III

24th Naval Fighter Wing ("24 Wing") was a Fleet Air Arm formation of the Royal Navy during the Second World War. It was formed at RNAS Henstridge on 25 October 1943 from 887 Naval Air Squadron and 894 Naval Air Squadron, both equipped with the Supermarine Seafire. The wing was formed for service with the fleet carrier HMS Indefatigable and subsequently operated in Home Fleet and British Pacific Fleet operations before being absorbed into the 7th Carrier Air Group on 30 June 1945.

== History ==
=== Formation and training ===
The wing was formed at RNAS Henstridge, Somerset, on 25 October 1943 with 887 and 894 Naval Air Squadrons. Both squadrons operated the Supermarine Seafire fighter aircraft and were intended for employment as a carrier-based fighter force.

894 Squadron had returned to RNAS Henstridge from the Mediterranean in October 1943 and joined 887 Squadron in forming the wing. 887 Squadron subsequently completed its move from RNAS Machrihanish, Argyll and Bute, to RNAS Henstridge in December.

On 8 January 1944 the wing moved to RNAS Burscough, Lancashire and on 6 February moved to RAF Ballyhalbert in County Down, Northern Ireland. During March, 887 Squadron moved to RNAS Eglinton, County Londonderry. In April the two squadrons operated from RAF Culmhead, Somerset, where they provided fighter escort for Hawker Typhoon aircraft engaged in anti-shipping operations in the English Channel. The wing returned to RAF Ballyhalbert on 15 May.

The wing undertook deck landing training aboard HMS Indefatigable in May 1944. This training preceded its operational embarkation: 887 Squadron embarked on 6 July and 894 Squadron on 24 July, completing the wing aboard the carrier.

=== Home Fleet and Norwegian operations ===
HMS Indefatigable operated with the Home Fleet during the summer of 1944, with 24 Wing providing fighter protection for the carrier's operations against German forces in Norway. The wing participated in operations including Operation Mascot, Operation Turbine, Operation Offspring and Operation Goodwood.

During Operation Mascot on 17 July, the carrier's aircraft participated in the attack on the German battleship Tirpitz. The attack failed to damage the battleship, although the operation formed part of the continuing British effort to neutralise the German fleet at its Norwegian base.

On 2 August HMS Indefatigable sailed for Operation Turbine, during which aircraft attacked German radar and communications installations ashore. On 10 August, during Operation Offspring, aircraft from the carrier's force attacked Gossen airfield and destroyed six Messerschmitt Bf 110 heavy fighters on the ground and a radar station.

On 22 August, during Operation Goodwood, HMS Indefatigable contributed Supermarine Seafires to the attacks on Tirpitz. Two 894 Squadron pilots, Sub-Lieutenant H.T. Palmer and Sub-Lieutenant R.H. Reynolds, subsequently shot down two Blohm & Voss BV 138 flying boats off the North Cape. Sub-Lieutenant I. Sargent of 887 Squadron failed to return in his Seafire and subsequently force-landed in Norway, where he was captured.

Operation Divan, planned for September, was cancelled because of bad weather. The wing subsequently prepared for service overseas with the British Pacific Fleet.

=== British Pacific Fleet ===
In November 1944 HMS Indefatigable was allocated to the newly formed British Pacific Fleet. She sailed from Portsmouth on 19 November with an air group including 24 Naval Fighter Wing, comprising 887 and 894 Naval Air Squadrons equipped with Supermarine Seafires, together with 1770 Naval Air Squadron and 820 Naval Air Squadron.

The carrier arrived at Colombo, Ceylon, on 10 December and joined the 1st Aircraft Carrier Squadron. The Supermarine Seafires of 24 Wing subsequently provided the fighter component of HMS Indefatigable's air group during the British Pacific Fleet's operations in the Indian Ocean and Pacific.

During Operation Lentil on 4 January 1945, Supermarine Seafires from 24 Wing provided combat air patrol over the fleet while Grumman Avengers and Fairey Fireflies formed part of the striking force. The same basic division of roles was used during Operation Meridian, the British Pacific Fleet's attacks on Japanese oil refineries at Palembang, Sumatra.

During Operation Meridian II on 29 January, Japanese aircraft attacked the fleet. David Hobbs records that Supermarine Seafires destroyed five of seven Kawasaki Ki-48 bombers attacking the fleet, with the remaining two destroyed by a Vought Corsair from HMS Victorious and a Grumma Hellcat from HMS Indomitable.

The allocation of the individual victories in this engagement differs between later accounts and the surviving operational material. The article therefore does not use the Meridian II figure to establish an individual 24 Wing victory total.

=== Operation Iceberg ===
HMS Indefatigable joined Task Force 57 for Operation Iceberg, the British Pacific Fleet's contribution to the Allied campaign supporting the Battle of Okinawa. The Supermarine Seafires of 24 Wing were principally employed in fleet air defence, providing combat air patrol over the carrier force and, later, over radar-picket cruisers.

The wing suffered aircraft losses during the prolonged operation. The Royal Navy Research Archive's operational chronology records seven 887 Squadron aircraft and five 894 Squadron aircraft lost during the Operation Iceberg period.

The Fleet Air Arm Memorial Church's 2025 VE–VJ Day publication records seven Japanese aircraft shot down by 24 Wing during Iceberg Phase I and a further six during Phase II, giving a combined total of 13 enemy aircraft destroyed during the two phases.

From 12 May, the wing was tasked with providing combat air patrol over radar-picket cruisers positioned to the north-east and south-west of the fleet. Eight Seafires were allocated to the task at a time, comprising four L. Mk III and four F. Mk III aircraft, with the patrol maintained through the daylight period by successive sections.

On 4 May, three 887 Squadron pilots—Lieutenant A.S. Macleod, Sub-Lieutenant D.T. Challick and Chief Petty Officer Pilot I.B. Bird—each destroyed an A6M fighter during an engagement with four Japanese aircraft. The fourth Japanese aircraft escaped.

=== Operations against Japan ===
On 30 June 1945 the 24th Naval Fighter Wing ceased to exist as a separate formation when its two constituent squadrons, 887 and 894 Naval Air Squadrons, became part of the 7th Carrier Air Group. The reorganisation formed part of the post-European-war transition from naval fighter wings to carrier air groups for British Pacific Fleet carriers.

The former 24 Wing squadrons subsequently operated with 7th Carrier Air Group during the British Pacific Fleet's operations against the Japanese mainland. By August the carrier force was operating in conjunction with the United States Third Fleet off Japan.

On 15 August, eight Seafires from 887 and 894 Squadrons escorted Grumman Avengers and Fairey Fireflies on a strike towards the Tokyo area. The formation was intercepted by Japanese fighters, including A6M Zeros and J2M Raidens. The British formation reported four Japanese aircraft destroyed, four probably destroyed and four damaged.

Among the British claims recorded for the engagement, Sub-Lieutenant V.S. Lowden of 887 Squadron was credited with two A6Ms destroyed and a shared third; Sub-Lieutenant L.G.J. Murphy of 887 Squadron was credited with two A6Ms destroyed; and Sub-Lieutenant D.N. Duncan of 894 Squadron was credited with one A6M destroyed and another probable. Other 894 Squadron pilots claimed damage to Japanese aircraft. Sub-Lieutenant F. Hockley of 894 Squadron was shot down and captured and was subsequently executed by Japanese forces.

The engagement occurred on the final day of the war with Japan. Accounts differ over which Allied fighter unit participated in the final fighter engagement of the war, with British and United States Navy formations both encountering Japanese aircraft that morning.

== Squadrons ==
24th Naval Fighter Wing consisted throughout its operational existence of two squadrons, both operating the Supermarine Seafire. The wing was established for carrier operations aboard HMS Indefatigable and remained associated with the carrier through its Home Fleet, British Pacific Fleet and final operations against Japan until its reorganisation into the 7th Carrier Air Group.

- 887 Naval Air Squadron, October 1943 - June 1945
- 894 Naval Air Squadron, October 1943 - June 1945

== Naval air stations and carrier deployments ==
24 Wing operated from a succession of Royal Navy naval air stations and RAF stations in the United Kingdom before embarking in HMS Indefatigable. The two constituent squadrons were occasionally deployed independently during the training and working-up period. Following its deployment to the British Pacific Fleet, the wing also operated temporarily from shore bases in Ceylon, Australia and the Pacific, while its aircraft carrier was at sea.

- Royal Naval Air Station Henstridge (HMS Dipper), Somerset.
  - 24 Wing formed 25 October 1943.
  - 894 Naval Air Squadron (19 October – December 1943).
  - 887 Naval Air Squadron (13 December 1943 – 8 January 1944).
- Royal Naval Air Station Burscough (HMS Ringtail), Lancashire.
  - 24 Wing (8 January – 6 February 1944).
  - 887 Naval Air Squadron.
  - 894 Naval Air Squadron.
- Royal Air Force Ballyhalbert, County Down, Northern Ireland.
  - 24 Wing (6 February – 15 May 1944), except when its squadrons operated separately.
  - 887 Naval Air Squadron (6 February – 21 March 1944).
  - 894 Naval Air Squadron (6 February – 28 April 1944).
- Royal Naval Air Station Eglinton (HMS Gannet), County Londonderry, Northern Ireland.
  - 887 Naval Air Squadron (21 March – 18 April 1944; 30 May – July 1944).
  - 894 Naval Air Squadron (18–24 July 1944).
- Royal Air Force Culmhead, Somerset.
  - 24 Wing (April – 15 May 1944), providing fighter escort for Hawker Typhoon anti-shipping operations.
  - 887 Naval Air Squadron (18 April – 15 May 1944).
  - 894 Naval Air Squadron (28 April – 15 May 1944).
- HMS Indefatigable
  - Deck-landing training (23–30 May 1944).
  - 887 Naval Air Squadron (embarked 6 July 1944).
  - 894 Naval Air Squadron (embarked 24 July 1944).
  - 24 Wing operated with the carrier during Home Fleet operations in Norway, including Operation Mascot, Operation Turbine, Operation Offspring and Operation Goodwood.
- Royal Air Force Wick, Caithness.
  - 887 Naval Air Squadron (4 July 1944), en route to HMS Indefatigable.
- Royal Air Force Skeabrae, Mainland, Orkney.
  - 887 Naval Air Squadron (6 July 1944), before embarking in HMS Indefatigable.
  - 887 and 894 Naval Air Squadrons (24 September – 16 October 1944), following the final Home Fleet operation of the summer.
- Royal Naval Air Station Grimsetter (HMS Robin), Mainland, Orkney.
  - 894 Naval Air Squadron (18–24 July 1944), before embarking in HMS Indefatigable.
  - 887 and 894 Naval Air Squadrons (16 October 1944), before embarking in HMS Implacable for passage south.
- HMS Implacable
  - 24 Wing embarked 16 October 1944 for passage south following the end of the Home Fleet deployment.
  - The wing disembarked to RNAS Lee-on-Solent on 30 October 1944.
- Royal Naval Air Station Lee-on-Solent (HMS Daedalus), Hampshire.
  - 887 and 894 Naval Air Squadrons (30 October – November 1944), following disembarkation from HMS Implacable.
  - Both squadrons were increased to 24 aircraft in preparation for service with the British Pacific Fleet.
- Royal Air Force Mona, Anglesey.
  - 887 and 894 Naval Air Squadrons (21 November 1944), used as an embarkation point for the passage to HMS Indefatigable.
- HMS Indefatigable
  - 24 Wing re-embarked in November 1944 for deployment to the British Pacific Fleet.
  - The carrier arrived at Colombo on 10 December and joined the 1st Aircraft Carrier Squadron.
- Royal Naval Air Station Katukurunda (HMS Ukussa), Ceylon.
  - 887 and 894 Naval Air Squadrons (10–24 December 1944).
  - 24 Wing conducted flying training ashore while preparing for operations with the British Pacific Fleet.
  - The wing re-embarked in HMS Indefatigable on 24 December.
- HMS Indefatigable
  - 24 Wing (24 December 1944 – 10 February 1945).
  - Operation Lentil (January 1945).
  - Operation Meridian (January 1945).
  - The Seafires principally provided combat air patrol and fleet air defence.
- Royal Naval Air Station Schofields (HMS Nabthorpe (Mobile Naval Air Base No. 3), New South Wales.
  - 887 and 894 Naval Air Squadrons (10–27 February 1945).
  - The squadrons were disembarked following the completion of Operation Meridian and re-embarked on 27 February for further operations with the British Pacific Fleet.
- HMS Indefatigable
  - 24 Wing (27 February – 5 June 1945), with the carrier operating from Sydney via Manus Island and Ulithi Atoll before joining Task Force 57.
  - Operation Iceberg, 26 March – 25 May 1945.
  - The wing's Seafires operated principally in fleet air-defence and combat air patrol roles.
- Pityilu Island, Admiralty Islands.
  - A proportion of 24 Wing's personnel and aircraft was temporarily flown ashore during the carrier's working-up period at Manus in March 1945.
- Ulithi Atoll.
  - 24 Wing remained associated with HMS Indefatigable while the British Pacific Fleet assembled for Operation Iceberg.
  - The fleet departed Ulithi on 23 March 1945 for the Sakishima-Gunto operations.
- San Pedro Bay, Leyte.
  - 24 Wing remained embarked in HMS Indefatigable during the first phase of Operation Iceberg.
  - The carrier force arrived at San Pedro Bay on 23 April for replenishment before returning to operations.
- Royal Naval Air Station Schofields (HMS Nabthorpe) (Mobile Naval Air Base No. 3), New South Wales.
  - 887 and 894 Naval Air Squadrons and 24 Wing (5–30 June 1945).
  - The squadrons were disembarked while the British Pacific Fleet replenished and re-equipped in Australia.
- disbanded into 7th Carrier Air Group, 30 June 1945.

The 24th Naval Fighter Wing therefore followed a broadly carrier-oriented progression from its formation and work-up in the United Kingdom, through its operational deployment aboard HMS Indefatigable with the Home Fleet, to its overseas deployment with the British Pacific Fleet. Unlike some other wartime naval fighter wings, it remained associated with the same carrier throughout its principal operational career, although the squadrons operated from shore bases at various stages for training, replenishment and re-equipment.

== Aircraft ==
Naval Air Squadrons assigned to 24 Wing flew different variants of only one aircraft type:

- Supermarine Seafire F Mk.IIc fighter aircraft (1943)
- Supermarine Seafire F Mk.III fighter aircraft (1943 - 1945)
- Supermarine Seafire L Mk.III fighter aircraft (1943 - 1945)

== Wing leaders ==
The wing's recorded commanding officer chronology was:

- Lieutenant Commander N.G. Hallett, DSC, RN, from 31 December 1943.
- Lieutenant Commander B.F. Wiggington, DSC, RNVR, from 22 May 1944.
- Lieutenant Commander(A) A.J. Thomson, DSC, RNVR, from 1 November 1944.
- Lieutenant Commander N.G. Hallett, DSC & Bar, RN, from 12 March 1945.
- absorbed into the 7th Carrier Air Group - 30 June 1945.

Note: Abbreviation (A) signifies Air Branch of the RN or RNVR.

== See also ==
- Fleet Air Arm
- List of aircraft wings of the Royal Navy
- 7th Carrier Air Group
- 887 Naval Air Squadron
- 894 Naval Air Squadron
- HMS Indefatigable
- British Pacific Fleet
- Operation Iceberg

== Bibliography ==
- Ballance, Theo; Howard, Lee; Sturtivant, Ray (2016). The Squadrons and Units of the Fleet Air Arm. Air-Britain Historians Limited. ISBN 978-0-85130-489-2.
- Hobbs, David (2013). British Aircraft Carriers: Design, Development and Service Histories. Seaforth Publishing. ISBN 978-1-84832-138-0.
- Hobbs, David (2011). The British Pacific Fleet: The Royal Navy's Most Powerful Strike Force. Naval Institute Press. ISBN 978-1-59114-044-3.
- Wragg, David (2019). The Fleet Air Arm Handbook 1939–1945. The History Press. ISBN 978-0-7509-9303-6.
