= Lowden =

Lowden is a name that originates in Scotland, where it is a Scottish variant of the geographic name Lothian. Lowden may refer to:

== People ==
- Frank Orren Lowden (1861–1943), American politician
- George Lowden (born 1951), British guitar maker
- Gordon Lowden (1927–2012), British accountant
- Hunter Lowden (born 1982), Canadian sailor
- Jack Lowden (born 1990), Scottish actor
- John Lowden (born 1953), British art historian
- Luke Lowden (born 1991), Australian football player
- Sue Lowden (born 1952), American politician
- Victor Lowden (1923–1998), British pilot and businessman
- William Lowden (c.1740-1820), Scottish-Canadian merchant and shipbuilder

== Places ==
- Lowden, Iowa
- Lowden, Washington
- Lowden State Park, Illinois
- Lowden, Western Australia, a locality in the Shire of Donnybrook–Balingup

== See also ==
- Loudon (disambiguation)
