= HMS Nabthorpe =

Mobile Operational Naval Air Base (MONAB) of the Royal Navy

HMS Nabthorpe Mobile Operational Naval Air Base III
- at RAAF Station Schofields, Schofields, Sydney, New South Wales in Australia

Site information
- Type: Mobile Operational Naval Air Base
- Owner: Department of Defence
- Operator: Royal Navy
- Controlled by: Fleet Air Arm
- Condition: disused

Location
- Location within New South Wales HMS Nabthorpe (Australia)
- Coordinates: 33°42′49″S 150°52′16″E

Site history
- In use: 1945 – 1945
- Fate: MONAB decommissioned, dismantled and removed
- Battles/wars: World War II; Pacific War

Garrison information
- Garrison: MONAB III
- Occupants: Flying units: 702 Instrument Flying Training & Checking Squadron; 706 Crew Pool & Refresher Flying School; 899 Seafire Pool Squadron/OTU; Support functions: Mobile Maintenance (MM) No. 2; Maintenance Servicing (MS) No. 3; Maintenance Servicing (MS) No. 4

Airfield information
- Elevation: 50 feet (15 m) AMSL
Runways
Direction	Length and surface
04/24	1,335 yards (1,221 m) x 50 yards (46 m) unsealed gravel pavement
11/29	1,500 yards (1,372 m) x 50 yards (46 m) unsealed gravel pavement
15/33	1,665 yards (1,522 m) x 50 yards (46 m) unsealed gravel pavement
- Source: Royal Navy Research Archive

HMS Nabthorpe was a Royal Navy, (RN), Mobile Operational Naval Air Base (MONAB) situated at the Royal Australian Air Force (RAAF) base RAAF Station Schofields located at Schofields, New South Wales during the final year of the Second World War. HMS Nabthorpe was also known as MONAB III and Royal Naval Air Station Schofields (or RNAS Schofields).

== History ==
The third MONAB assembled at RNAS Ludham (HMS Flycatcher), Norfolk, on 18 October 1944. The unit was designated as a type A (Small) MONAB, with the responsibility of providing support for a maximum of 50 aircraft. It was assigned the following components: Mobile Maintenance (MM) No. 2 and Mobile Servicing (MS) Nos. 3 and 4, a combination which was responsible for the Vought Corsair Mk II & IV, Grumman Hellcat F. Mk. I & II, Supermarine Seafire F Mk III and Fairey Firefly I. MONAB III was established as an independent command with its own accounts at RNAS Ludham on 4 December, when it was commissioned as HMS Nabthorpe, led by Commander(A) E.W. Kenton, RNVR.

Stores, equipment & vehicles sailed aboard the SS Essex on 4 December 1944, and personnel sailed from Liverpool in the SS Athlone Castle on 22 December 1944 bound for Sydney, Australia. The main party arrived in Sydney on 25 January 1945 and were accommodated at HMS Golden Hind, Camp Warwick, a part of the Royal Navy barracks in Sydney, whilst awaiting the allocation of an operating base and the arrival of SS Essex, which arrived at Sydney on 4 February 1945.

An advance party was sent to RAAF Station Schofields on 5 February 1945 to prepare the airfield for the arrival of squadron personnel and aircraft which were to arrive with the British Pacific Fleet. Upon arrival of the main party of personnel they were accommodated under canvas tents as the station had no permanent buildings at the time.

RAAF Station Schofields was officially transferred to the Royal Navy and commissioned as HMS Nabthorpe, Royal Naval Air Station (RNAS) Schofields, on 18 February 1945.

When 899 Naval Air Squadron disembarked from HMS Chaser on 23 April 1945 the unit became a Supermarine Seafire Pool Squadron, but in July it became a Seafire Operational Training Unit, training RAAF pilots in naval flying techniques, including deck landings. Deck landing training was carried out upon the carrier HMS Indomitable for the first course, and HMS Arbiter for the second course. The successful pilots were to form the nucleus of the Royal Australian Navy Fleet Air Arm.

The 7th Carrier Air Group was formed on 30 June 1945 at HMS Nabthorpe. It consisted 820 Naval Air Squadron, which operated Grumman Avenger, an American torpedo bomber aircraft, and 1700 Naval Air Squadron which flew carrier-borne fighter and anti-submarine Fairey Firefly. These were joined with what was the 24th Naval Fighter Wing from the Implacable-class aircraft carrier, HMS Indefatigable which was made up of 887 Naval Air Squadron and 894 Naval Air Squadron, l both of which were equipped with Supermarine Seafire, a navalised version of the Supermarine Spitfire fighter aircraft.

The Commander in Chief of the British Pacific Fleet, Admiral Sir Bruce Fraser, GCB, KBE, RN, visited RNAS Schofields (HMS Nabberley) on 28 July 1945 as part of his tour of the support facilities in Australia.

HMS Nabthorpe, MONAB III, was paid off on 15 November 1945 and RNAS Schofields re-commissioned as HMS Nabstock, MONAB VI, on the same day.

== Commanding officers ==
List of commanding officers of HMS Nabthorpe with date of appointment:

- Commander(A) E.W. Kenton, RNVR, from 4 December 1944

== Units based at HMS Nabthorpe ==
List of units associated with MONAB III, in support of disembarked Squadrons and the provision of crew pool & refresher flying school:

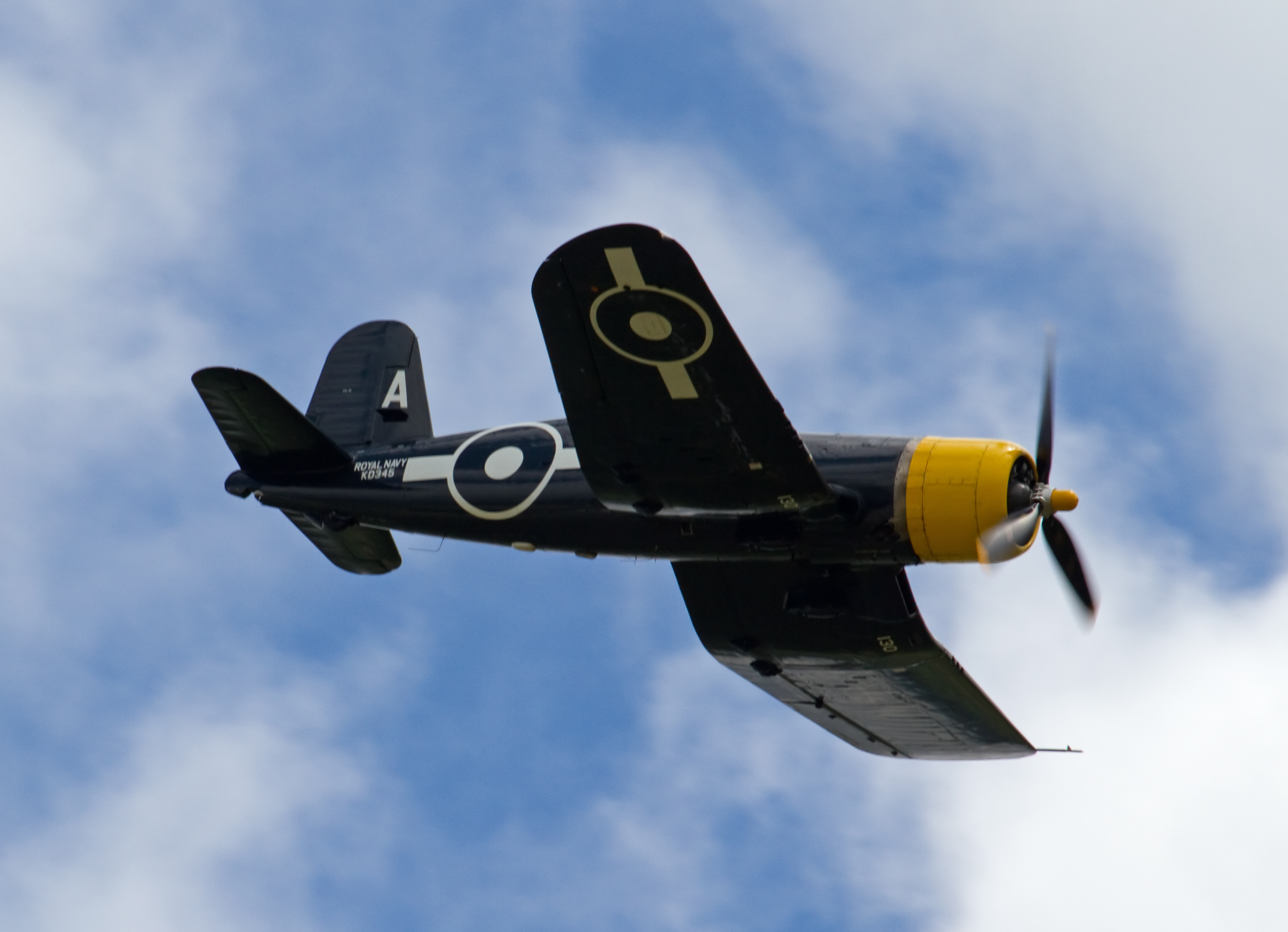
Vought Corsair Mk IV an example of the type seen around HMS Nabthorpe

=== Function ===
- 702 Instrument Flying Training & Checking Squadron
- 706 Pool & Refresher Flying Training Squadron
- Seafire Pool Squadron/Operational Training Unit

=== Aviation support components ===
- Mobile Maintenance (MM) No. 2
- Mobile Servicing (MS) No. 3
- Mobile Servicing (MS) No. 4

=== Aircraft type supported ===
- Vought Corsair Mk II & IV
- Grumman Hellcat F. Mk. I & II
- Supermarine Seafire F MK III & L Mk III
- Fairey Firefly I

== Squadrons at HMS Nabthorpe ==
List of Fleet Air Arm first and second line squadrons, station flight and other flying units either based at or disembarked to RNAS Schofields (HMS Nabthorpe) and MONAB III:

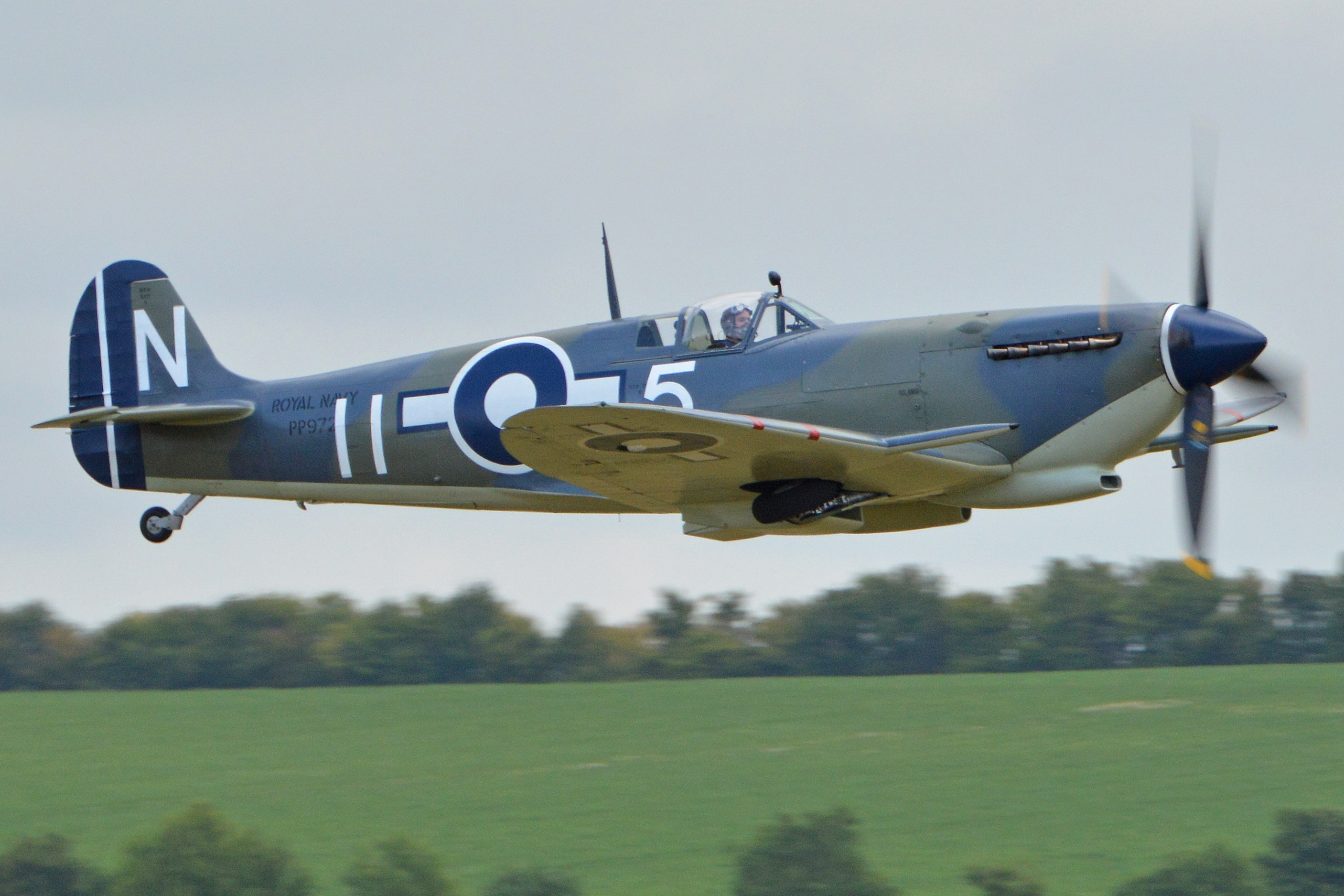
Supermarine Seafire L Mk III in the markings of 880 Naval Air Squadron, which disbanded at RNAS Schofields in September 1945

=== Based squadrons ===
- 702 Naval Air Squadron, an Instrument Flying Training & Checking Squadron. It moved here on 4 September 1945, equipped with Airspeed Oxford training aircraft and North American Havard IIB trainer aircraft.
- 706 Naval Air Squadron was a Crew Pool & Refresher Flying Training Squadron which was equipped with six each of Grumman Avenger, Fairey Barracuda, Vought Corsair, Fairey Firefly, Grumman Hellcat and Supermarine Seafire. The squadron arrived on 6 March 1945 from RNAS Jervis Bay (HMS Nabswick) and left for RNAS Maryborough (HMS Nabstock) on 28 August.

==== Operational Training Unit ====
- 899 Naval Air Squadron, was an Operational Training Unit (OTU) for Supermarine Seafire. It disembarked from HMS Chaser on 23 April 1945. The unit operated No.1 and No.2 RANVR conversion courses, equipped with Supermarine Seafire L Mk III. The squadron disbanded here on 18 September.

=== Disembarked squadrons ===
==== Torpedo, Bomber, Reconnaissance Squadrons ====
- 814 Naval Air Squadron, was a Torpedo, Bomber and Reconnaissance Squadron which disembarked from HMS Venerable on 21 July 1945. It was equipped with the British carrier-borne torpedo and dive bomber, Fairey Barracuda Mk II. The squadron re-embarked in HMS Venerable on 13 August 1945.
- 820 Naval Air Squadron, a Torpedo, Bomber and Reconnaissance Squadron, disembarked from HMS Indefatigable on 5 June 1945, equipped with th American Grumman Avenger torpedo bomber aircraft. The unit re-embarked in HMS Indefatigable 1 July 1945.
- 837 Naval Air Squadron was Torpedo, Bomber and Reconnaissance Squadron which disembarked from HMS Glory on 16 August 1945, equipped with Fairey Barracuda Mk II aircraft. It re-embarked in HMS Glory on 1 September 1945.

==== Fighter Squadrons ====
- 801 Naval Air Squadron, a Single Seat Fighter Squadron which disembarked from the aircraft carrier HMS Implacable, on 9 September 1945, equipped with Supermarine Seafire L Mk III, which was subsequently upgraded to the F Mk XVII variant.
- 880 Naval Air Squadron, a Single Seat Fighter Squadron, disembarked from the aircraft carrier HMS Implacable on 25 August 1945 and was subsequently disbanded on 11 September. The squadron was equipped with Supermarine Seafire L Mk III fighter aircraft.
- 885 Naval Air Squadron was a Single Seat Fighter Squadron. The squadron disembarked from HMS Ruler on 20 March 1945 and re-embarked on 4 April. Subsequently, it disembarked again from HMS Ruler on 5 April, before re-embarking on 14 April. The squadron later disembarked from HMS Indefatigable on 18 September 1945 and was officially disbanded on 27 September. The squadron was equipped with Grumman Hellcat F. Mk. I and II fighter aircraft.
- 887 Naval Air Squadron was a Single Seat Fighter Squadron which was equipped with Supermarine Seafire L Mk III. It was disembarked from HMS Indefatigable between 10 and 27 February 1945. It disembarked again on 5 June from HMS Indefatigable and re-embarked on 7 July. On 18 September, the squadron disembarked once more from HMS Indefatigable, only to re-embark again on 15 November.
- 894 Naval Air Squadron was a Single Seat Fighter Squadron which disembarked from the aircraft carrier HMS Indefatigable on two occasions: first from 10 to 25 February 1945 and again on 5 June. The squadron re-embarked in HMS Indefatigable on 7 July 1945 and subsequently disembarked once more on 18 September. The squadron was equipped with Supermarine Seafire L Mk III fighter aircraft.
- 1770 Naval Air Squadron was Two-Seater Fighter Squadron which disembarked from HMS Indefatigable on two occasions: first from 10 to 27 February 1945 and again on 5 June. Subsequently, the squadron relocated to RNAS Maryborough (HMS Nabstock) on 29 August and was equipped with Fairey Firefly I aircraft.
- 1772 Naval Air Squadron was Two-Seater Fighter Squadron which disembarked from HMS Ruler on 18 March 1945. Subsequently, the squadron embarked in HMS Indefatigable on 7 July and later disembarked from the same vessel on 18 September. It was equipped with Fairey Firefly I aircraft.
- 1790 Naval Air Squadron was a Night Fighter Squadron which disembarked from the escort carrier HMS Vindex on 13 August 1945 and was equipped with Fairey Firefly NF.Mk I night fighter variant.
- 1831 Naval Air Squadron was a Single Seat Fighter Squadron which disembarked from the aircraft carrier HMS Glory on 16 August 1945, and subsequently re-embarked on the same vessel on 1 September. The squadron was equipped with Vought Corsair Mk IV aircraft.
- 1834 Naval Air Squadron was a Single Seat Fighter Squadron which disembarked from the aircraft carrier HMS Victorious between 5–26 June 1945, equipped with Vought Corsair Mk IV aircraft.
- 1836 Naval Air Squadron, a Single Seat Fighter Squadron, also disembarked from HMS Victorious between 5–26 June 1945, utilising Vought Corsair Mk IV aircraft.
- 1840 Naval Air Squadron was a Single Seat Fighter Squadron which disembarked from the escort carrier HMS Speaker on 23 February 1945, and subsequently re-embarked on the same vessel on 9 March. The squadron was equipped with Grumman Hellcat F. MK. II fighter aircraft.
- 1843 Naval Air Squadron was a Single Seat Fighter Squadron which disembarked from the escort carrier HMS Arbiter between 1 and flew to RNAS Maryborough on 4 June and was equipped with Vought Corsair Mk IV aircraft.
- 1845 Naval Air Squadron was a Single Seat Fighter Squadron, equipped with Vought Corsair Mk IV aircraft, which disembarked from the escort carrier HMS Slinger on 25 February 1945 and subsequently re-embarked on 11 March.

== Aircraft carriers disembarked from/embarked to ==
List of Royal Navy aircraft carriers that Royal Navy Fleet Air Arm squadrons disembarked from, or embarked in, at HMS Nabthorpe:

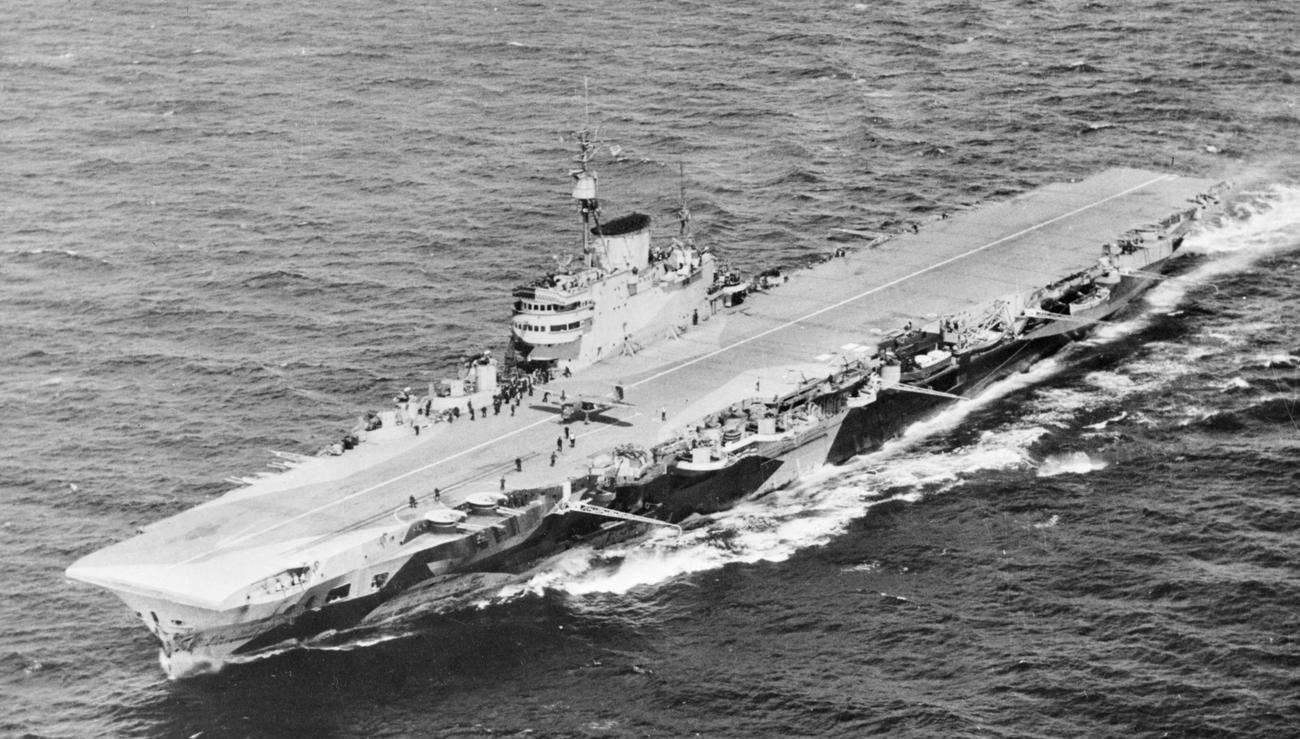
HMS Indefatigable (R10)

- HMS Arbiter
- HMS Chaser
- HMS Glory
- HMS Indefatigable
- HMS Indomitable
- HMS Implacable
- HMS Ruler
- HMS Slinger
- HMS Speaker
- HMS Venerable
- HMS Victorious
- HMS Vindex

== Satellite Airfields ==
- Woy Woy Aerodrome
