= List of Fleet Air Arm battle honours =

This is a List of Fleet Air Arm battle honours. These battle honours for the Fleet Air Arm were initially awarded to naval air squadrons from action during the Second World War. One additional one, 'East Indies 1940-45' was added later and four more have been awarded since 1945: 'Korea 1950-53', 'Falkland Islands 1982', 'Kuwait 1991' and 'Al Faw 2003'.

== History ==
Royal Navy Ships' Battle Honours were formalised in 1954, starting with 'Armada 1588' through to 'Japan 1945'. The Battle Honours Committee, which advises which are official Honours, formed of the head of the Naval Historical Branch plus a senior officer from the staff of the Second Sea Lord. The criteria consisted: "Sinking of enemy merchant ships in an escorted convoy; Engagements with light forces when both sides often incurred losses; Operations resulting in the effective complete frustration of the enemy's intention even although no warship may have been sunk." There were a couple of rules applied: "A Battle Honour will be awarded for those actions resulting in the defeat of the enemy, or when the action was inconclusive but well fought, and for exceptional cases where outstanding efforts were made against overwhelming odds; A Battle Honour will not be awarded for a British defeat, or when the action was inconclusive and badly fought."

== Battle Honours ==
The following is the list of battle honours that have been awarded to Fleet Air Arm squadrons:"Battle honours by unit" (PDF). Royal Navy Research Archive.
Battle Honour	Description	Fleet Air Arm Squadrons
Atlantic 1939-45	Awarded both for convoy escort duty and for participation in any successful action between the Arctic Circle and the Equator.	Squadron Nos: 700, 801, 802, 804, 807, 808, 810, 811, 813, 814, 816, 817, 818, 819, 820, 824, 825, 826, 833, 835, 836, 837, 838, 840, 842, 846, 850, 860, 881, 882, 892, 896, 898 and 1832.
English Channel 1939-45	Awarded to coastal convoy escorts and for participation in any successful action in the English Channel and other waters between Southend-on-Sea and Bristol, east of a line between Ushant and the Isles of Scilly, and including the north coast of Cornwall.	Squadron Nos: 811, 812, 818, 819, 825 and 841.
North Sea 1939-45	Awarded to coastal convoy escorts and for participation in any successful action in the North Sea and other waters between Southend-on-Sea and Shetland, except coastal waters off Norway.	Squadron Nos: 803, 811, 812 and 826.
River Plate 1939	Pursuit and sinking of the Kriegsmarine "pocket battleship" Admiral Graf Spee, December 1939.	Squadron Nos: 700.
Norway 1940-45	Operations in coastal waters off Norway as far north as Tromsø, initially 8 April 1940 - 8 June 1940, but later extended to successful actions in these waters up to VE Day.	Squadron Nos: 700, 701, 800, 801, 802, 803, 804, 806, 810, 816, 817, 818, 820, 821, 823, 825, 827, 828, 829, 830, 831, 841, 842, 846, 852, 853, 856, 880, 881, 882, 887, 894, 896, 898, 1770, 1771, 1832, 1834, 1836, 1840, 1841 and 1842.
Narvik 1940	Forces taking part in the two Battles of Narvik, during the defence of Norway, 10 and 13 April 1940.	Squadron Nos: 700, 816 and 818.
Dunkirk 1940	Evacuation of British Expeditionary Force, Operation Dynamo, 26 May 1940 - 4 June 1940.	Squadron Nos: 801, 806, 825 and 826.
Biscay 1940-45	Awarded for forces taking part in a successful action between Ushant and Cape Ortegal, from 12° west to the French coast.	Squadron Nos: 817.
East Indies 1940-45	For successful attacks against enemy shipping or significant enemy shore installations in the Indian Ocean, including the Red Sea, Bay of Bengal and the Arabian Sea, June 1940 - August 1945.	Squadron Nos: 700, 800, 804, 808, 809, 810, 813, 815, 817, 820, 822, 824, 826, 829, 831, 832, 834, 845, 847, 849, 851, 854, 857, 887, 888, 894, 896, 1770, 1830, 1833, 1834, 1836, 1837, 1839 and 1844
Mediterranean 1940-45	Awarded for any operation in the Mediterranean not covered by a successful award of any other battle honour.	Squadron Nos: 700, 767, 800, 803, 806, 810, 812, 813, 815, 816, 818, 819, 820, 821, 824, 826, 828, 829 and 830.
Calabria 1940	Action against Italian fleet off Calabria, Italy, 9 July 1940.	Squadron Nos: 813 and 824.
Libya 1940-42	Inshore operations between Port Said and Benghazi, and in support of the Army in the Western Desert campaign, September 1940 - June 1942.	Squadron Nos: 803, 805, 806, 813, 819, 821, 824 and 826.
Taranto 1940	Night air strike on Italian fleet and harbour, 11–12 November 1940.	Squadron Nos: 813, 815, 819 and 824.
Spartivento 1940	Action off Cape Spartivento, Sardinia, against Italian battleships and cruisers, 27 November 1940. Battle of Cape Spartivento	Squadron Nos 700, 800, 808, 810, 818 and 820.
Malta Convoys 1941-42	Operations to resupply aircraft and stores to Malta, January 1941 - December 1942.	Squadron Nos: 800, 801, 806, 807, 808, 809, 812, 813, 816, 820, 824, 825, 827, 831, 832, 884 and 885.
Matapan 1941	Night action off Cape Matapan, Greece, against Italian fleet, 28–29 March 1941.	Squadron Nos: 700, 803, 806, 815, 826 and 829.
Crete 1941	For action during the defence and evacuation of Crete, 20 May - 1 June 1941.	Squadron Nos: 805.
Bismarck 1941	Pursuit and destruction of the German battleship Bismarck in North Atlantic, 23–27 May 1941.	Squadron Nos: 800, 808, 810, 818, 820 and 825.
Arctic 1941-45	Covering forces employed as escorts or in support of convoys running to and from northern ports in the Soviet Union within the Arctic Circle, January 1941 - May 1945.	Squadron Nos: 802, 809, 811, 813, 816, 819, 822, 824, 825, 832, 833, 835, 842, 846, 853, 856, 882, 883, 893 and 1832.
Malaya 1942-45	For participation in successful actions in the Straits of Malacca and waters adjacent to the Malay Peninsula and Sumatra between 7° north and 7° south, and 95-108° east, between January 1942 - August 1945.	Squadron Nos: 851.
Diego Suarez 1942	Support of landings in Madagascar, Operation Ironclad, 5–7 May 1942.	Squadron Nos: 800, 806, 810, 827, 829, 831, 880, 881 and 882.
North Africa 1942-43	Support of landing forces and of Army ashore in Algeria and Tunisia, Operation Torch, 8 November 1942 - 20 February 1943.	Squadron Nos: 700, 800, 801, 802, 804, 807, 809, 817, 820, 822, 832, 833, 880, 882, 883, 884, 885, 888, 891 and 893.
Sicily 1943	Support of landing forces in Sicily, 9 July – 17 August 1943, Operation Husky.	Squadron Nos: 807, 817, 820, 880, 885, 888, 893 and 899.
Salerno 1943	Support of landing forces at Salerno on the Italian mainland, 9 – 18 September 1943, Operation Avalanche.	Squadron Nos: 807, 808, 809, 810, 820, 834, 878, 879, 880, 886, 887, 888, 890, 893, 894, 897 and 899.
Normandy 1944	Covering and support of forces in the English Channel, Dover to Ushant, for landings in France, 6 June - 3 July 1944, Operation Neptune.	Squadron Nos: 800, 804, 808, 816, 819, 838, 846, 848, 849, 850, 854, 855, 881, 885, 886, 896 an 897. (No. 700 NAS was also included, even though it had officially disbanded March 1944)
Sabang 1944	Air strikes and bombardment on harbour and oil installations at Sabang, North Sumatra, 25 July 1944, Operation Crimson.	Squadron Nos: 831, 1830, 1833, 1836, 1837 and 1838.
South of France 1944	Support of landing forces on the south coast of France, 15–27 August 1944, Operation Dragoon.	Squadron Nos: 800, 807, 809, 879, 881, 882 and 899.
Aegean 1943-44	Engagements with the enemy in all waters of the Aegean Archipelago, geographically between 35 and 42° north, 22-30° east, between 7 September - 28 November 1943, and January - December 1944.	Squadron Nos: 800, 807, 809, 879, 881 and 899.
Burma 1944-45	Operations over Burma, October 1944 - April 1945 and May - August 1945.	Squadron Nos: 800, 804, 807, 808, 809, 815, 851, 896 and 1700.
Palembang 1945	Air strikes on the oil refineries near Palembang on Sumatra, 24 January 1945, Operation Meridian I.	Squadron Nos: 820, 849, 854, 857, 887, 894, 1770, 1830, 1833, 1834, 1836, 1839 and 1844.
Okinawa 1945	Attacks on airfields in the Sakashima Gunto group of islands in the East China Sea, up to and including the assault on Okinawa, 26 March - 25 May 1945, Operation Iceberg.	Squadron Nos: 820, 848, 849, 854, 857, 885, 887, 894, 1770, 1830, 1833, 1834, 1836, 1839, 1840, 1841, 1842, 1844 and 1845.
Japan 1945	Operations against warships and mainland targets on the Japanese home islands, 16 July - 11 August 1945.	Squadron Nos: 801, 820, 828, 848, 849, 880, 887, 1771, 1772, 1834, 1836, 1841 and 1842.
Korea 1950-53	Ships and Squadrons involved in operations in support of United Nations forces ashore in Korea, 2 July 1950 - 27 July 1953.	Squadron Nos: 800, 801, 802, 804, 805, 807, 808, 810, 812, 817,821, 825 and 827
Falkland Islands 1982	Operation Corporate: the campaign to liberate the Falkland Islands from occupying Argentine forces, ships and Squadrons operating in the South Atlantic between 35°-60° south, 2 April - 13 June 1982.	Squadron Nos: 737, 800, 801, 809, 815, 820, 824, 825, 826, 829, 845, 846, 847, 848 and 899.
Kuwait 1991	Operation Granby: forces engaged in operations against Iraqi forces or in logistic support duties in Central and Northern Gulf, west of 51° east, 17 January - 28 February 1991.	Squadron Nos: 815, 826, 829, 845, 846 and 848.
Al Faw 2003	Operation Telic: forces in contact with the enemy in operations within the sea and land territories of, or the airspace above, Iraq and Kuwait, 19 March - 30 April 2003.	Squadron Nos: 845 and 847.

=== Battle Honours by FAA Squadron ===
The following table is the list of battle honours by Fleet Air Arm squadrons:
Fleet Air Arm Squadron	Battle Honour
700 Naval Air Squadron	River Plate 1939, Norway 1940, Spartivento 1940, Atlantic 1940-41, Matapan 1941, Mediterranean 1942-43, North Africa 1942-43
701 Naval Air Squadron	Norway 1940
737 Naval Air Squadron	Falkland Islands 1982
767 Naval Air Squadron	Mediterranean 1940
800 Naval Air Squadron	Norway 1940, Mediterranean 1940-41, Spartivento 1940, Bismarck 1941, Malta Convoys 1941-42, Diego Suarez 1942, North Africa 1942, Aegean 1943-44, South France 1944, Burma 1944-45, Korea 1950, Falkland Islands 1982
801 Naval Air Squadron	Norway 1940-41, Dunkirk 1940, Malta Convoys 1942, Japan 1945, Korea 1952-53, Falkland Islands 1982
802 Naval Air Squadron	Norway 1940, Atlantic 1941, Arctic 1942, Korea 1952
803 Naval Air Squadron	North Sea 1939, Norway 1940, Libya 1940-41, Matapan 1941, Mediterranean 1941
804 Naval Air Squadron	Norway 1940-44, Atlantic 1941, North Africa 1942, Burma 1945, Korea 1951-52
805 Naval Air Squadron	Crete 1941, Libya 1941-42, Korea 1951-52
806 Naval Air Squadron	Norway 1940, Dunkirk 1940, Mediterranean 1940-41, Libya 1940-41, Matapan 1941, Diego Suarez 1942, Malta Convoys 1942
807 Naval Air Squadron	Atlantic 1940, Malta Convoys 1941-42, North Africa 1942-43, Sicily 1943, Salerno 1943, South France 1944, Aegean 1944, Burma 1945, Korea 1950-53
808 Naval Air Squadron	Spartivento 1940, Bismarck 1941, Malta Convoys 1941, Atlantic 1943, Salerno 1943, Normandy 1944, Burma 1945, Korea 1951-52
809 Naval Air Squadron	Arctic 1941, Malta Convoys 1942, North Africa 1942, Salerno 1943, Aegean 1944, South France 1944, Burma 1945, Falkland Islands 1982
810 Naval Air Squadron	Norway 1940, Mediterranean 1940-41, Spartivento 1940, Bismarck 1941, Atlantic 1941, Diego Suarez 1942, Salerno 1943, Korea 1950-53
811 Naval Air Squadron	English Channel 1942, North Sea 1942, Atlantic 1942-44, Arctic 1944
812 Naval Air Squadron	North Sea 1940, English Channel 1940-42, Mediterranean 1941, Malta Convoys 1941, Korea 1951-52
813 Naval Air Squadron	Calabria 1940, Mediterranean 1940-41, Taranto 1940, Libya 1940-41, Malta Convoys 1942, Atlantic 1944, Arctic 1944-45
814 Naval Air Squadron	Atlantic 1940
815 Naval Air Squadron	Mediterranean 1940-41, Taranto 1940, Libya 1940-41, Matapan 1941, Burma 1944, Falkland Islands 1982, Kuwait 1991
816 Naval Air Squadron	Norway 1940, Malta Convoys 1941, Mediterranean 1941, Atlantic 1943, Arctic 1944, Korea 1951-52
817 Naval Air Squadron	Norway 1941, North Africa 1942, Biscay 1942, Sicily 1943, Korea 1951-52
818 Naval Air Squadron	Norway 1940, Spartivento 1940, Mediterranean 1940-41, Bismarck 1941, Atlantic 1941
819 Naval Air Squadron	Libya 1940, Taranto 1940, Mediterranean 1940-41, English Channel 1942, Atlantic 1943-44, Arctic 1944
820 Naval Air Squadron	Norway 1940-44, Spartivento 1940, Mediterranean 1940, Bismarck 1941, Atlantic 1941, Malta Convoys 1941, North Africa 1942-43, Sicily 1943, Salerno 1943, Palembang 1945, Okinawa 1945, Japan 1945, Falkland Islands 1982
821 Naval Air Squadron	Norway 1940, Libya 1942, Mediterranean 1942-43, Korea 1952-53
822 Naval Air Squadron	North Africa 1942-43, Arctic 1943
823 Naval Air Squadron	Norway 1940
824 Naval Air Squadron	Calabria 1940, Mediterranean 1940, Taranto 1940, Libya 1940-41, Malta Convoys 1942, Arctic 1944, Falkland Islands 1982
825 Naval Air Squadron	Dunkirk 1940, English Channel 1940-42, Norway 1940, Bismarck 1941, Malta Convoys 1941, Arctic 1942-45, Atlantic 1944, Korea 1952, Falkland Islands 1982
826 Naval Air Squadron	Dunkirk 1940, North Sea 1940-44, Matapan 1941, Mediterranean 1941-43, Libya 1941-42, Falkland Islands 1982, Kuwait 1991
827 Naval Air Squadron	Diego Suarez 1942, Malta Convoys 1942, Norway 1944, Korea 1950
828 Naval Air Squadron	Mediterranean 1941-43, Norway 1944, Japan 1945
829 Naval Air Squadron	Matapan 1941, Mediterranean 1941, Diego Suarez 1942, Norway 1944, Falkland Islands 1982, Kuwait 1991
830 Naval Air Squadron	Mediterranean 1940-42, Norway 1944
831 Naval Air Squadron	Diego Suarez 1942, Malta Convoys 1942, Norway 1944, Sabang 1944
832 Naval Air Squadron	Arctic 1942, Malta Convoys 1942, North Africa 1942
833 Naval Air Squadron	North Africa 1942, Arctic 1944, Atlantic 1944
834 Naval Air Squadron	Atlantic 1942, Salerno 1943
835 Naval Air Squadron	Atlantic 1943-44, Arctic 1944-45
836 Naval Air Squadron	Atlantic 1943-45
837 Naval Air Squadron	Atlantic 1942-43
838 Naval Air Squadron	Atlantic 1943
840 Naval Air Squadron	Atlantic 1943
841 Naval Air Squadron	English Channel 1943, Norway 1944
842 Naval Air Squadron	Norway 1944, Arctic 1944
845 Naval Air Squadron	Falkland Islands 1982, Kuwait 1991, Al Faw 2003
846 Naval Air Squadron	Atlantic 1944, Norway 1944-45, Arctic 1944-45, Falkland Islands 1982, Kuwait 1991
847 Naval Air Squadron	Falkland Islands 1982, Kuwait 1991, Al Faw 2003
848 Naval Air Squadron	Okinawa 1945, Japan 1945, Falkland Islands 1982, Kuwait 1991
849 Naval Air Squadron	Palembang 1945, Okinawa 1945, Japan 1945
850 Naval Air Squadron	Normandy 1944, Atlantic 1944
851 Naval Air Squadron	Malaya 1945, Burma 1945
882 Naval Air Squadron	Norway 1944
853 Naval Air Squadron	Arctic 1944-45, Norway 1945
854 Naval Air Squadron	Palembang 1945, Okinawa 1945
856 Naval Air Squadron	Norway 1944-45, Arctic 1945
857 Naval Air Squadron	Palembang 1945, Okinawa 1945
860 Naval Air Squadron	Atlantic 1944-45
878 Naval Air Squadron	Salerno 1943
879 Naval Air Squadron	Salerno 1943
880 Naval Air Squadron	Diego Suarez 1942, North Africa 1942, Sicily 1943, Salerno 1943, Norway 1944, Japan 1945
881 Naval Air Squadron	Diego Suarez 1942, Norway 1944, Aegean 1944, South France 1944, Atlantic 1944
882 Naval Air Squadron	Diego Suarez 1942, North Africa 1942, Atlantic 1943-44, South France 1944, Norway 1944-45, Arctic 1945
883 Naval Air Squadron	Arctic 1942, North Africa 1942
884 Naval Air Squadron	Malta Convoys 1942, North Africa 1942
885 Naval Air Squadron	Malta Convoys 1942, North Africa 1942-43, Sicily 1943, Normandy 1944, Okinawa 1945
886 Naval Air Squadron	Salerno 1943, Normandy 1944
887 Naval Air Squadron	Salerno 1943, Norway 1944, Palembang 1945, Okinawa 1945, Japan 1945
888 Naval Air Squadron	North Africa 1942-43, Sicily 1943, Salerno 1943
890 Naval Air Squadron	Salerno 1943
891 Naval Air Squadron	North Africa 1942
892 Naval Air Squadron	Atlantic 1943
893 Naval Air Squadron	North Africa 1942-43, Sicily 1943, Salerno 1943, Arctic 1943
894 Naval Air Squadron	Salerno 1943, Norway 1944, Palembang 1945, Okinawa 1945
896 Naval Air Squadron	Atlantic 1944, Norway 1944, Burma 1945
897 Naval Air Squadron	Salerno 1943, Normandy 1944, Korea 1952-53
898 Naval Air Squadron	Norway 1944, Atlantic 1944, Korea 1952-53
899 Naval Air Squadron	Sicily 1943, Salerno 1943, South France 1944, Aegean 1944, Falkland Islands 1982
1700 Naval Air Squadron	Burma 1945
1770 Naval Air Squadron	Norway 1944, Palembang 1945, Okinawa 1945
1771 Naval Air Squadron	Norway 1944, Japan 1945
1772 Naval Air Squadron	Japan 1945
1830 Naval Air Squadron	Sabang 1944, Palembang 1945, Okinawa 1945
1832 Naval Air Squadron	Atlantic 1944, Norway 1944, Arctic 1944
1833 Naval Air Squadron	Sabang 1944, Palembang 1945, Okinawa 1945
1834 Naval Air Squadron	Norway 1944, Sabang 1944, Palembang 1945, Okinawa 1945, Japan 1945
1836 Naval Air Squadron	Norway 1944, Sabang 1944, Palembang 1945, Okinawa 1945, Japan 1945
1837 Naval Air Squadron	Sabang 1944
1838 Naval Air Squadron	Sabang 1944
1839 Naval Air Squadron	Palembang 1945, Okinawa 1945
1840 Naval Air Squadron	Norway 1944, Okinawa 1945
1841 Naval Air Squadron	Norway 1944, Okinawa 1945, Japan 1945
1842 Naval Air Squadron	Norway 1944, Okinawa 1945, Japan 1945
1844 Naval Air Squadron	Palembang 1945, Okinawa 1945
1845 Naval Air Squadron	Okinawa 1945

== See also ==
- List of Fleet Air Arm aircraft squadrons
