= 1770 Naval Air Squadron =

Inactive flying squadron of the Royal Navy's Fleet Air Arm

- Squadron badge
- Active: 1943–1945
- Disbanded: 30 September 1945
- Country: United Kingdom
- Branch: Royal Navy
- Type: Two-seat fighter squadron
- Role: Fighter Squadron
- Size: twelve aircraft
- Part of: Fleet Air Arm
- Home station: See Naval air stations section for full list.
- Mottos: Videre est vincere (Latin for 'To see is to conquer')
- Engagements: World War II: European theatre of World War II; Operation Mascot; Pacific War; Operation Meridian; Operation Iceberg
- Battle honours: Norway 1944; East Indies; Palembang 1945; Okinawa 1945

Commanders
- Notable commanders: Major V.B.G. Cheesman, DSO, MBE, DSC, RM

Insignia
- Squadron Badge Description: Blue, issuant from a base barry wavy of four white and blue a trident gold on the centre tine a firefly lambent proper (1943)
- Identification Markings: single letters 5A+ 4A+ 270-281 (March 1945) single letters (August 1945)
- Fin Carrier Code: S (March 1945)

Aircraft flown
- Fighter: Fairey Firefly

1770 Naval Air Squadron (1770 NAS) was a Naval Air Squadron of the Royal Navy's Fleet Air Arm. It formed at RNAS Yeovilton (HMS Heron), on 10 September 1943, as a two-seat Fighter Squadron and embarked on HMS Indefatigable in May 1944. It took part in several attacks on the German Battleship Tirpitzand other operations in Norwegian waters before sailing for the Far East. In 1945, as part of the British Pacific Fleet, the squadron took part in attacks on Sumatra, Sakishima Gunto and Formosa. It disembarked to Australia in June 1945 and then disbanded on 30 September 1945 at RNAS Maryborough (HMS Nabstock), Queensland, Australia.

== History ==
=== Two-seater Fighter Squadron (1943-1945) ===
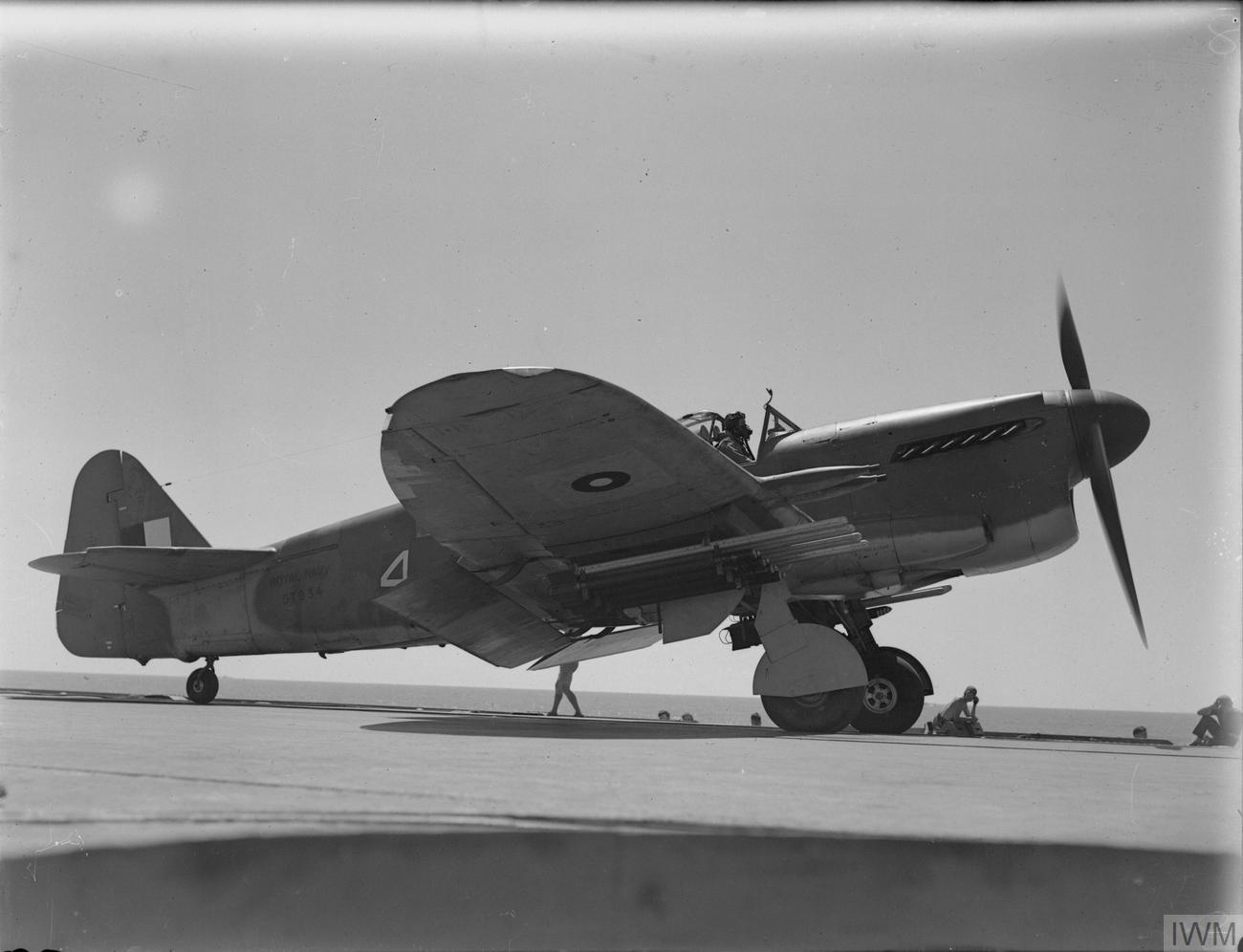
A Fairey Firefly of 1770 Naval Air Squadron awaiting the signal to take off from the flight deck of HMS Indefatigable

1770 Naval Air Squadron formed at RNAS Yeovilton (HMS Heron), Somerset, on 10 September 1943 as a two-seater fighter squadron, led by Lieutenant Commander(A) I.P. Godfrey, RNVR. It was equipped with twelve Fairey Firefly I, a carrier-borne fighter, anti-submarine and reconnaissance aircraft.

During the middle of December the squadron flew north to the Orkney Islands. Initially based at RNAS Grimsetter (HMS Robin), near Kirkwall, Mainland. Major V.B.G. Cheesman, DSO, MBE, DSC, RM took command and it then moved the short distance to RNAS Hatston (HMS Sparrowhawk), in the middle of February 1944.

The squadron embarked in the newly completed Implacable-class aircraft carrier, HMS Indefatigable, in May 1944. It took part in operations against the German battleship Tirpitz in July, as part of Operation Mascot, where it attacked German auxiliary vessels and shore-based gun positions.

More sorties were later conducted off Norway, along with another attack on the Tirpitz, before Indefatigable sailed along with the squadron for the Far East, and subsequently joined the British Pacific Fleet.

During April 1945, the squadron was part of the attacks on the Japanese-held oil refineries situated at Palembang on the Dutch East Indies island of Sumatra. It also operated over the Sakishima Islands between March and May 1945, and later against Formosa, the main island of Taiwan.

1770 Naval Air Squadron disembarked to RNAS Schofields (HMS Nabthorpe), New South Wales, Australia, in June, where it became part of the 7th Carrier Air Group, but it disbanded, shortly after the Second World War ended, on 30 September 1945.

== Aircraft flown ==
1770 Naval Air Squadron flew only one aircraft type:

- Fairey Firefly I fighter and anti-submarine aircraft (September 1943 - September 1945)

== Battle honours ==
The battle honours awarded to 1770 Naval Air Squadron are:

- Norway 1944
- East Indies 1945
- Palembang 1945
- Okinawa 1945

== Assignments ==
1770 Naval Air Squadron was assigned as needed to form part of a number of larger units:

- 7th Carrier Air Group (30 June - July 1945)

== Naval air stations ==
1770 Naval Air Squadron operated from a number of naval air stations of the Royal Navy, in the United Kingdom, a number overseas, and a Royal Navy fleet carrier:

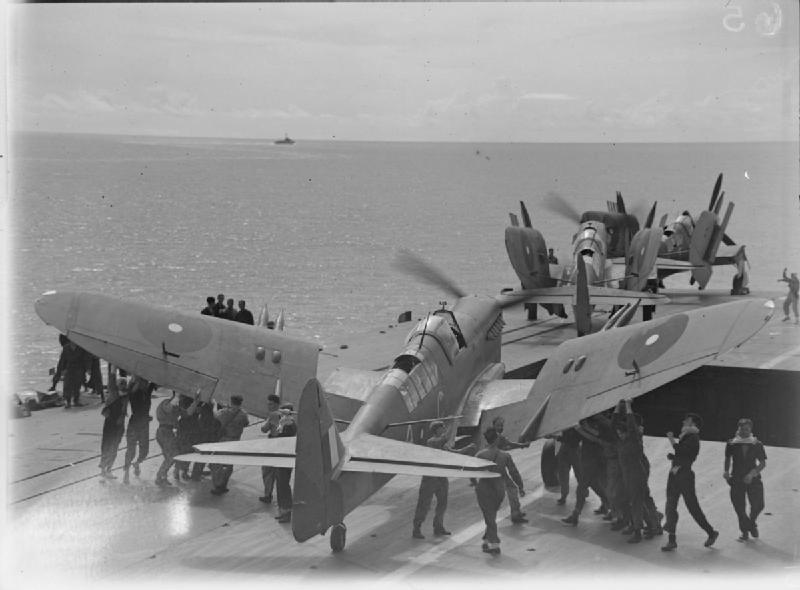
A Fairey Firefly of 1770 Naval Air Squadron, on board HMS Indefatigable, on the aircraft's return from an air strike on a Japanese oil refinery, on Sumatra

- Royal Naval Air Station Yeovilton (HMS Heron), Somerset, (10 September - 14 December 1943)
- Royal Naval Air Station Grimsetter (HMS Robin), Mainland, Orkney, (14 December 1943 - 15 February 1944)
- Royal Naval Air Station Hatston (HMS Sparrowhawk), Mainland, Orkney, (15 February - 18 May 1944)
- HMS Indefatigable (18 - 29 May 1944)
- Royal Naval Air Station Ауг (HMS Wagtail), South Ayrshire, (29 May - 10 June 1944)
- HMS Indefatigable (10 June - 5 July 1944)
- Royal Naval Air Station Grimsetter (HMS Robin), Mainland, Orkney, (5 - 9 July - 1944)
- HMS Indefatigable (9 - 25 July 1944)
- Royal Naval Air Station Hatston (HMS Sparrowhawk), Mainland, Orkney, (transit) (25 July 1944)
- Royal Naval Air Station Donibristle (HMS Merlin), Fife, (25 - 27 July 1944)
- Royal Naval Air Station Burscough (HMS Ringtail), Lancashire, (27 July - 2 August 1944)
- Royal Naval Air Station Hatston (HMS Sparrowhawk), Mainland, Orkney, (2 - 7 August 1944)
- HMS Indefatigable (7 August - 26 September 1944)
  - Royal Naval Air Station Grimsetter (HMS Robin), Mainland, Orkney, (Detachment 6–17 September 1944)
- Royal Naval Air Station Ayr (HMS Wagtail), South Ayrshire, (26 September - 16 November 1944)
- Royal Naval Air Station Dale (HMS Goldcrest), Pembrokeshire, (16 - 21 November 1944)
- HMS Indefatigable (21 November - 16 December 1944)
- Royal Naval Air Station Puttalam (HMS Rajaliya), Ceylon, (16 - 24 December 1944)
- HMS Indefatigable (24 December 1944 - 10 February 1945)
- Royal Naval Air Station Schofields (HMS Nabthorpe), New South Wales, (10 - 27 February 1945)
- HMS Indefatigable (27 February - 5 June 1945)
- Royal Naval Air Station Schofields (HMS Nabthorpe), New South Wales, (5 June - 29 August 1945)
- Royal Naval Air Station Maryborough (HMS Nabstock), Queensland, (29 August - 30 September 1945)
- disbanded - (30 September 1945)

== Commanding officers ==
List of commanding officers of 1770 Naval Air Squadron with date of appointment.

- Lieutenant Commander(A) I.P. Godfrey, RNVR, from 10 September 1943
- Major V.B.G. Cheesman, DSO, MBE, DSC, RM, from 5 February 1944
- Lieutenant Commander(A) D.J. Holmes, RN, 22 June 1945
- disbanded 30 September 1945

Note: Abbreviation (A) signifies Air Branch of the RN or RNVR.
