= 887 Naval Air Squadron =

Inactive flying squadron of the Royal Navy's Fleet Air Arm

- Squadron badge
- Active: 1942–1946
- Disbanded: 16 March 1946
- Country: United Kingdom
- Branch: Royal Navy
- Type: Single-seat fighter squadron
- Role: Fleet fighter squadron
- Size: Squadron
- Part of: Fleet Air Arm
- Home station: See Naval air stations section for full list.
- Mottos: Nec Temere Nec Timide (Latin for 'Neither rashly, nor timidly')
- Engagements: World War II: Operation Avalanche; Operation Mascot; Operation Goodwood; Operation Meridian; Operation Iceberg
- Battle honours: Salerno 1943; Norway 1944; East Indies 1945; Palembang 1945; Okinawa 1945; Japan 1945

Insignia
- Squadron Badge Description: Blue, a base barry wavy of eight white and blue a sword winged gold surmounted by a terrestrial globe white (1943)
- Identification Markings: 2A+ (Seafire); P5A+ (Seafire June 1944); H5A+ (Seafire December 1944); 111+ (Seafire August 1945)
- Tail Codes: S (Seafire August 1945)

Aircraft flown
- Fighter: Fairey Fulmar; Supermarine Spitfire; Supermarine Seafire

887 Naval Air Squadron (887 NAS) was a Naval Air Squadron of the Royal Navy's Fleet Air Arm, which last disbanded during March 1946. It was formed as a Fleet Fighter squadron in May 1942 at HMS Daedalus, RNAS, Lee-on-Solent. The squadron embarked in HMS Unicorn during 1943 for convoy escort duties and later in the year to cover the allied landings at Salerno, Italy. At the end of 1943 it formed part of the 24th Naval Fighter Wing. 1944 saw it embark in HMS Indefatigable and the squadron saw action in operations against the German battleship Tirpitz during early 1944 and then joined the British Pacific Fleet at the end of the year. It was part of the attacks on the oil refineries at Palembang at the start of 1945 and later in the year it was involved in sorties around Tokyo, as part of the 7th Carrier Air Group, before V-J Day.

== History ==
=== Fleet fighter squadron (1942 - 1946) ===
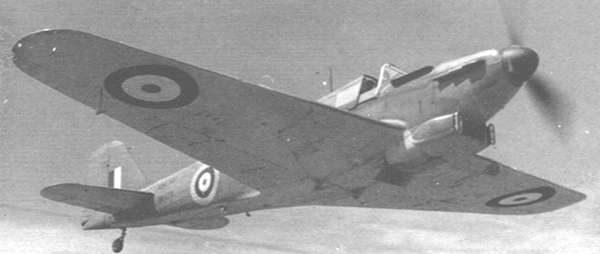
Fairey Fulmar Mk.II, of the type used by 887 NAS

887 Naval Air Squadron formed at RNAS Lee-on-Solent (HMS Daedalus), Hampshire, as a Fleet Fighter squadron, on 1 May 1942, under the command of Lieutenant G.R. Callingham, RN. It was initially equipped with six Fairey Fulmar Mk.II, a carrier-based reconnaissance and fighter aircraft.

Working up and training saw the squadron move around a number of airbases. On 1 June it moved to RNAS Yeovilton (HMS Heron), Somerset. On 10 July it relocated to RNAS Charlton Horethorne (HMS Heron II), Somerset, before moving again to RNAS St Merryn (HMS Vulture), Cornwall, on the 25.

The squadron flew north to RAF Dyce, Aberdeenshire, Scotland, at the end of July. Lieutenant Commander D.W. Kirke, RN, arrived to take command of the squadron on 29 August. It spent two and a half months in Scotland before it moved again, this time to Northern Ireland, arriving at RNAS Belfast on the 15 October and four days later moved to RAF Ballyhalbert, County Down. Then from 4 November the squadron operated from its satellite station at RAF Kirkistown, County Down and eventually moving back to RNAS Lee-on-Solent (HMS Daedalus), in mid-December.

In December, 887 Naval Air Squadron re-equipped with six Supermarine Spitfire Mk Va single seat fighter aircraft, pending the arrival of Supermarine Seafire, a navalised development of the Spitfire and it eventually acquired Supermarine Seafire Mk.Ib.

In April 1943 the squadron, now equipped with nine Supermarine Seafire Mk.IIc, embarked on the light aircraft carrier, HMS Unicorn for a convoy escort duty during May. Afterwards it disembarked to RNAS Belfast, Northern Ireland, and then re-embarked in HMS Unicorn on 11 July to return to the Mediterranean, subsequently provided air cover over the amphibious landing at Salerno, Italy, Operation Avalanche, in September 1943, with some aircraft detached ashore for a short period. In October 1943, 887 Naval Air Squadron joined the 24th Naval Fighter Wing.

During April 1944 the squadron escorted RAF Hawker Typhoon fighter-bomber aircraft on anti-shipping sorties in the English Channel. Then in July it embarked in the Implacable-class aircraft carrier, HMS Indefatigable for action off Norway, including fighter cover during Operation Mascot, the dive-bombing attack on the German battleship Tirpitz at her anchorage in Kaafjord, North Norway and Operation Goodwood also against Tirpitz and also both Operations Turbine and OffSpring along the Norwegian coast. In October 1944 the squadron briefly operated from HMS Indefatigable's sister ship HMS Implacable. The squadron embarked again in HMS Indefatigable, from RNAS Lee-on-Solent (HMS Daedalus) in November, for the East Indies Fleet and subsequently the British Pacific Fleet.

In January 1945 the squadron took part in the attack on the oil refineries at Palembang, Sumatra and it was subsequently involved in strikes on the Sakashima Gunto islands in the East China Seas, and on Formosa. June 1945 was spent at RNAS Schofields, the squadron re-embarking on HMS Indefatigable in July and was involved in strikes around Tokyo just before VJ-Day, with 887 squadron Seafire NN212 coded "112/S" flown by Sub Lt GJ Murphy shooting down 2 Japanese A6M in flames, at Odaki Bay on 15 August 1945, whilst escorting Avengers to Kisarazu airfield, 30 miles south of Tokyo. The ship and squadrons finally returned to the UK in March 1946.

== Aircraft operated ==
The squadron has operated a number of different aircraft types, including:

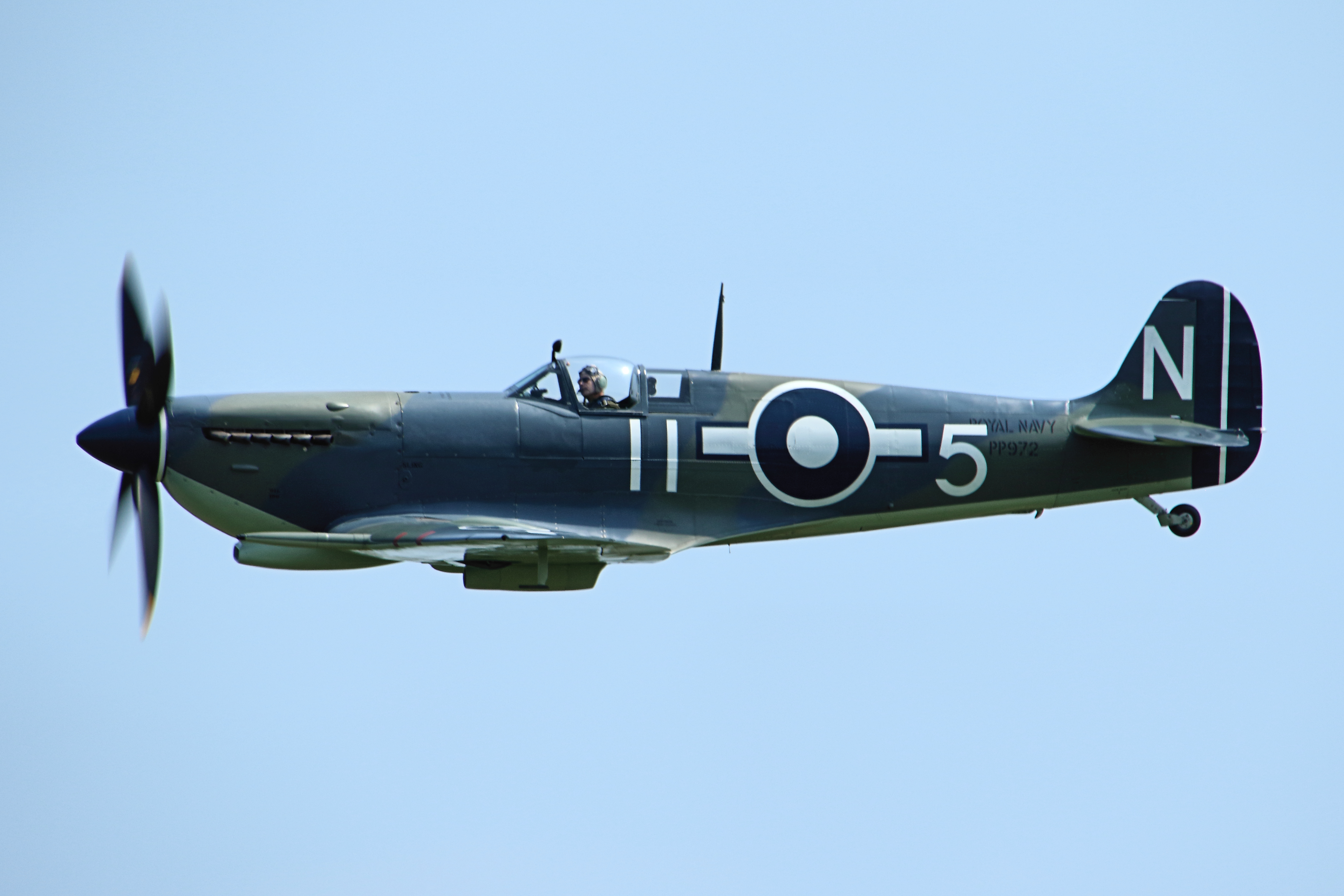
Supermarine Seafire F Mk.III

- Fairey Fulmar Mk.I reconnaissance/fighter aircraft (June 1942)
- Fairey Fulmar Mk.II reconnaissance/fighter aircraft (May - December 1942)
- Supermarine Spitfire Mk Va fighter aircraft (December 1942 - April 1943)
- Supermarine Seafire Mk.Ib fighter aircraft (January - February 1943)
- Supermarine Seafire F Mk.IIc fighter aircraft (March - December 1943)
- Supermarine Seafire F Mk.III fighter aircraft (December 1943 - March 1946)
- Supermarine Seafire L Mk.III fighter aircraft (December 1943 - March 1946)

== Battle honours ==
The battle honours awarded to 887 Naval Air Squadron are:

- Salerno 1943
- Norway 1944
- East Indies 1945
- Palembang 1945
- Okinawa 1945
- Japan 1945

== Naval air stations and aircraft carriers ==
887 Naval Air Squadron operated from a number of naval air stations of the Royal Navy, and Royal Air Force stations in the UK and overseas, and also a number of Royal Navy fleet carriers and escort carriers and other airbases overseas:

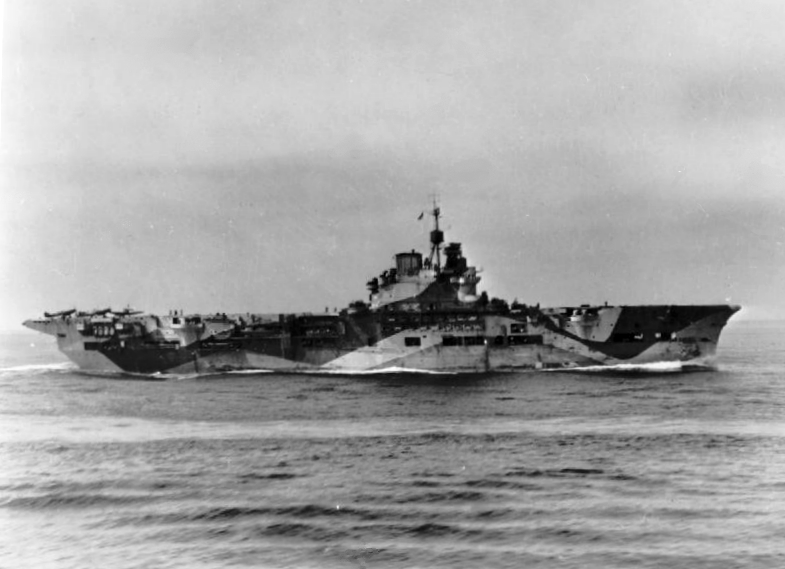
HMS Unicorn

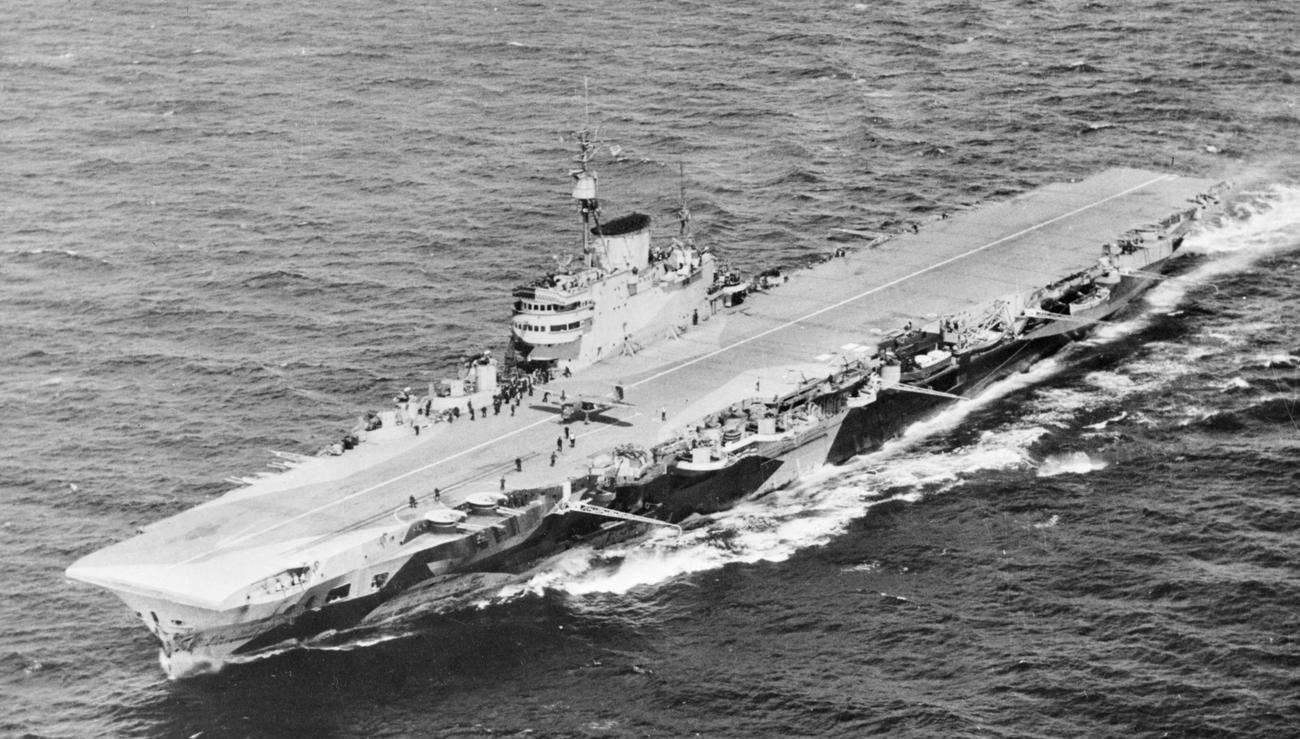
HMS Indefatigable

- Royal Naval Air Station Lee-on-Solent (HMS Daedalus) (1 May - 1 Jun 1942)
- Royal Naval Air Station Yeovilton (HMS Heron) (1 June - 10 July 1942)
- Royal Naval Air Station Charlton Horethorne (HMS Heron II) (10 - 25 July 1942)
- Royal Naval Air Station St Merryn (HMS Vulture) (25 - 28 July 1942)
- Royal Air Force Dyce (14 Gp) (28 July - 15 October 1942)
- Royal Naval Air Station Belfast (15 - 19 October 1942)
- Royal Air Force Ballyhalbert (19 October - 4 November 1942)
- Royal Air Force Kirkistown (4 November - 19 December 1942)
- Royal Naval Air Station Lee-on-Solent (HMS Daedalus) (19 December 1942 - 21 February 1943)
- Royal Naval Air Station Machrihanish (HMS Landrail) (21 February - 3 March 1943)
- Royal Naval Air Station St Merryn (HMS Vulture) (3 - 22 March 1943)
- Royal Naval Air Station Hatston (HMS Sparrowhawk) (22 March - 9 April 1943)
- Royal Naval Air Station Machrihanish (HMS Landrail) (9 - 19 April 1943)
- HMS Unicorn (19 April - 18 June 1943)
- Royal Naval Air Station Belfast (18 June - 11 July 1943)
- HMS Unicorn (11 July - 11 October 1943)
  - Paestum Airfield (Detachment 12–15 September 1943)
- Royal Naval Air Station Machrihanish (HMS Landrail) (11 October - 13 December 1943)
- Royal Naval Air Station Henstridge (HMS Dipper) (13 December 1943 - 8 January 1944)
- Royal Naval Air Station Burscough (HMS Ringtail) (8 January - 5 February 1944)
- Royal Naval Air Station Ballyhalbert (HMS Corncrake) (5 February - 21 March 1944)
- Royal Naval Air Station Eglinton (HMS Gannet) (21 March - 20 April 1944)
- Royal Air Force Culmhead (20 April - 15 May 1944)
- Royal Naval Air Station Ballyhalbert (HMS Corncrake) (15 - 23 May 1944)
- HMS Indefatigable (23 - 30 May 1944)
- Royal Naval Air Station Eglinton (HMS Gannet) (30 May - 6 July 1944)
- HMS Indefatigable (6 July - 24 September 1944)
- Royal Air Force Skeabrae (24 September - 16 October 1944)
- HMS Implacable (16 - 30 October 1944)
- Royal Naval Air Station Lee-on-Solent (HMS Daedalus) (30 October - 21 November 1944)
- HMS Indefatigable (21 November - 10 December 1944)
- Royal Naval Air Station Katukurunda (HMS Ukussa) (10 - 24 December 1944)
- HMS Indefatigable (24 December 1944 - 10 February 1945)
- Royal Naval Air Station Schofields (HMS Nabthorpe) (10 - 27 February 1945)
- HMS Indefatigable (27 February - 5 June 1945)
- Royal Naval Air Station Schofields (HMS Nabthorpe) (5 June - 7 July 1945)
- HMS Indefatigable (7 July - 18 September 1945)
- Royal Naval Air Station Schofields (HMS Nabthorpe) (18 September 15 November 1945)
- HMS Indefatigable (15 November - 22 December 1945)
- Royal Naval Air Station Schofields (HMS Nabthorpe) (22 December 1945 - 31 January 1946)
- HMS Indefatigable (31 January - 15 March 1946)
- Royal Naval Air Station Gosport (HMS Siskin) (15 - 16 March 1946)
- disbanded - (16 March 1946)

== Commanding officers ==
List of commanding officers of 887 Naval Air Squadron:

- Lieutenant G.R. Callingham, RN from 1 May 1942
- Lieutenant Commander D.W. Kirke, RN, from 29 August 1942
- Lieutenant Commander(A) B.F. Wiggington, DSC, RNVR, from 19 January 1944
- Lieutenant Commander(A) A.J. Thomson, DSC, RNVR, from 19 August 1944
- Lieutenant Commander N.G. Hallett, DSC & Bar, RN, from 14 May 1945
- Lieutenant Commander(A) G. Dennison RNVR, from 27 September 1945
- disbanded - 16 March 1946

Note: Abbreviation (A) signifies Air Branch of the RN or RNVR.
