= Gordon Lowden =

Scottish chartered accountant and businessman

Professor Gordon Stuart Lowden (22 May 1927 – 21 November 2012) was a Scottish chartered accountant and businessman.

== Early life ==
Lowden was born in Bangkok, the younger brother of Victor Lowden. He was educated at the High School of Dundee from 1932 to 1935 and Strathallan School from 1935 to 1944. Following a brief stint in the Royal Navy he graduated with an MA in law from St. John's College, Cambridge. On 12 December 1945, Lowden received his blue for Cambridge University R.U.F.C., playing scrum-half against Oxford University RFC in The Varsity Match, which Cambridge won 11–8 at Twickenham Stadium. He completed his studies in Dundee, graduating LLB and CA, from the University of St. Andrews.

== Career ==
Lowden started his career with Moody, Stuart & Robertson in Dundee, training with them from 1949 to 1953, becoming a partner in 1959. Later, he joined Peat Marwick McLintock before their merger with KPMG, becoming office managing partner in 1985. From 1979 to 1992 he was chairman of Dundee Port Authority.

In 1955, Lowden started lecturing part-time at the University of Dundee. He is credited with setting up the Department of Accountancy at the University. Lowden became senior lecturer and then professor in the Department of Accountancy and Business Finance. From 1991 to 1997 he was a member of the court of the University.

Lowden served as president of the Institute of Chartered Accountants of Scotland (ICAS) from 1989 to 1990, having served as senior vice-president from 1988 to 1989. His term in office was one of the most traumatic in the history of the organisation. As president, he oversaw a vote amongst the membership which would have merged the organisation with the Institute of Chartered Accountants in England and Wales (ICAEW), creating a new British Institute.

On 6 June 1989, members of ICAS and the ICAEW voted on a merger. ICAS voted against the merger, with 4023 voting no and 3274 voting yes, on a 60% turnout of 12,500 members. The ICAEW membership were overwhelmingly in favour of a merger, with 33,495 voting yes and only 2291 against, on a 40% turnout.

From London the message was one of disappointment and in Edinburgh one of reconciliation. The debate had been divisive and heated for over 18 months. ICAS members had made a decisive choice and as of 2015 retain their own Institute. In February 1990, Lowden explained his predictions for the future of the profession in Scotland.

== Sportsman ==
Lowden was a keen sportsman playing rugby for Dundee HSFP and captaining the team from 1949 to 1951. He was also a member of the Rules of Golf Committee at The Royal and Ancient Golf Club of St Andrews. In 2004 the committee became part of The R&A group of companies and still works in conjunction with the United States Golf Association to govern the rules of golf on a worldwide basis.
