= 1772 Naval Air Squadron =

Inactive flying squadron of the Royal Navy's Fleet Air Arm

- Squadron badge
- Active: 1944–1945
- Disbanded: 10 March 1946
- Country: United Kingdom
- Branch: Royal Navy
- Type: Two-seat fighter squadron
- Role: Fighter Squadron
- Size: twelve aircraft
- Part of: Fleet Air Arm
- Home station: See Naval air stations section for full list.
- Mottos: Tenax propositi (Latin for 'Steadfast of purpose')
- Engagements: World War II: Pacific War; Air raids on Japan
- Battle honours: Japan 1945

Insignia
- Squadron Badge Description: Per fess red and blue, a bow strung full draught in pale white with an arrow winged and flighted point downwards wings interlaced all gold (1944)
- Identification Markings: single letters 4A+ (October 1943); 270-281 (June 1945)
- Fin Carrier Codes: S (June 1945)

Aircraft flown
- Fighter: Fairey Firefly

1772 Naval Air Squadron (1772 NAS) was a Naval Air Squadron of the Royal Navy's Fleet Air Arm (FAA), which last disbanded, at Portsmouth, in March 1946. The squadron formed at HMS Ringtail, RNAS Burscough as a Fighter Squadron during May 1944. It joined HMS Ruler for passage to Australia leaving January 1945 and disembarking at HMS Nabstock, RNAS Schofields, mid-March. The squadron embarked in HMS Indefatigable in July, joining the British Pacific Fleet for attacks againgst the Japanese home islands. After the end of the Second World War it dropped supplies on PoW camps.

== History ==
=== Two-seater Fighter Squadron (1944–1946) ===
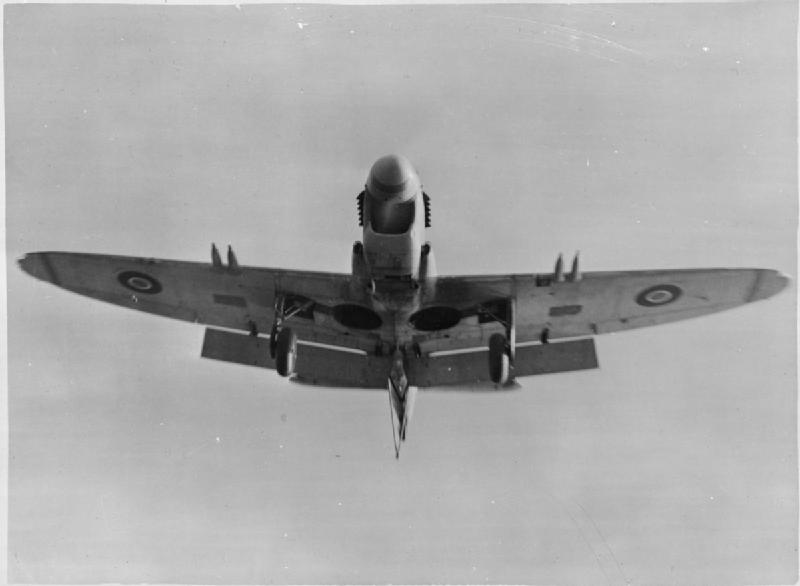
Fairey Firefly, an example of the type used by 1772 NAS

1772 Naval Air Squadron formed at RNAS Burscough (HMS Ringtail), Lancashire, England, on 1 May 1944, as a two-seater fighter squadron. It was equipped with twelve Fairey Firefly I, a carrier-borne fighter, anti-submarine and reconnaissance aircraft. During November the squadron undertook deck landing training (DLT) using the Ruler-class escort carrier HMS Empress. On completion of the training the squadron received new aircraft fitted with long-range fuel tanks (the original aircraft being re-allocated to 766 Naval Air Squadron.

The squadron travelled to RNAS Belfast (HMS Gadwall), Belfast, Northern Ireland in January 1945 where it prepared for embarking on the name ship of her class, HMS Ruler, for passage to the Pacific, for operations with the British Pacific Fleet, and departed on 20 January. disembarking for RNAS Schofields (HMS Nabstock), New South Wales, on 18 March 1945. It embarked in the Implacable-class aircraft carrier HMS Indefatigable on 7 July, becoming part of the 7th Carrier Air Group, for attacks against the Japanese home islands.

After V-J Day the squadron dropped supplies on PoW camps in Japan and HMS Indefatigable spent four days anchored in Tokyo Bay for the Japanese surrender in September. The aircraft carrier with its air group sailed for the United Kingdom at the end of January 1946. 1772 Naval Air Squadron disbanded on arrival at Portsmouth on 10 March.

== Aircraft flown ==
1772 Naval Air Squadron flew only one aircraft type:

- Fairey Firefly I fighter and anti-submarine aircraft (May 1944 - March 1946)

== Battle honours ==
The battle honours awarded to 1772 Naval Air Squadron are:

- Japan 1945

== Assignments ==
1772 Naval Air Squadron was assigned as needed to form part of a number of larger units:

- 7th Carrier Air Group (July 1945 - March 1946)

== Naval air stations ==
1772 Naval Air Squadron operated from a couple of naval air stations of the Royal Navy, in the United Kingdom and one overseas in Australia, and a couple of Royal Navy escort carriers and a Royal Navy fleet carrier:

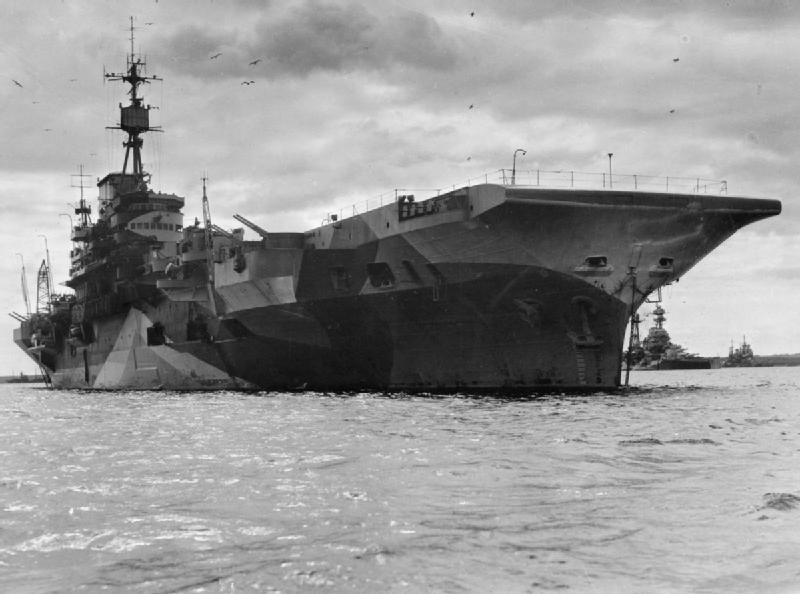
HMS Indefatigable

- Royal Naval Air Station Burscough (HMS Ringtail), Lancashire, (1 May 1944 - 16 January 1945)
  - HMS Empress (Detachment deck landing training (DLT) 25 - 27 November 1944)
- Royal Naval Air Station Belfast (HMS Gadwall), County Antrim, (16 - 20 January 1945)
- HMS Ruler (20 January - 18 March 1945)
- Royal Naval Air Station Schofields (HMS Nabstock), New South Wales, (18 March - 7 July 1945)
- HMS Indefatigable (7 July - 18 September 1945)
- Royal Naval Air Station Schofields (HMS Nabstock), New South Wales, (18 September - 18 November 1945)
- HMS Indefatigable (18 November - 22 December 1945)
- Royal Naval Air Station Schofields (HMS Nabstock), New South Wales, (22 December 1945 - 31 January 1946)
- HMS Indefatigable (31 January - 10 March 1946)
- disbanded - (10 March 1946)

== Commanding officers ==
List of commanding officers of 1772 Naval Air Squadron with date of appointment:

- Lieutenant Commander(A) A.H.D. Gough, RN, from 1 May 1944
- Lieutenant Commander(A) L.C. Wort, DSC, RNVR, from 3 November 1944
- Lieutenant Commander(A) D.J. Holmes, RNVR, from 24 September 1945
- disbanded - 10 March 1946

Note: Abbreviation (A) signifies Air Branch of the RN or RNVR.
