= Fred Hockley =

Royal Navy Sub-Lieutenant, Fleet Air Arm fighter pilot (1923–1945)

- Born: 4 March 1923; Littleport, Ely, Cambridgeshire
- Died: 15 August 1945 (aged 22); Ichinomiya, Chiba, Japan
- Military career
- Allegiance: United Kingdom
- Branch: Fleet Air Arm
- Rank: Sub-Lieutenant
- Conflicts: Second World War

Sub-Lieutenant Frederick (Fred) Hockley RNVR (1923–1945) was an English Royal Navy Fleet Air Arm fighter pilot who was shot down over Japan while taking part in the last combat mission flown by British aircraft in the Second World War.

Nine hours after Emperor Hirohito announced the unconditional surrender of Japan, on 15 August 1945, Hockley was secretly executed by soldiers from the Imperial Japanese Army. The two officers who instigated the killing were convicted of war crimes and hanged in Hong Kong in 1947.

== Early life ==
Hockley was born in Littleport near Ely in Cambridgeshire. His father was a foreman for the water board and a bellringer in the parish church. Fred attended Soham Grammar School and was a keen swimmer.

== Mission over Japan ==
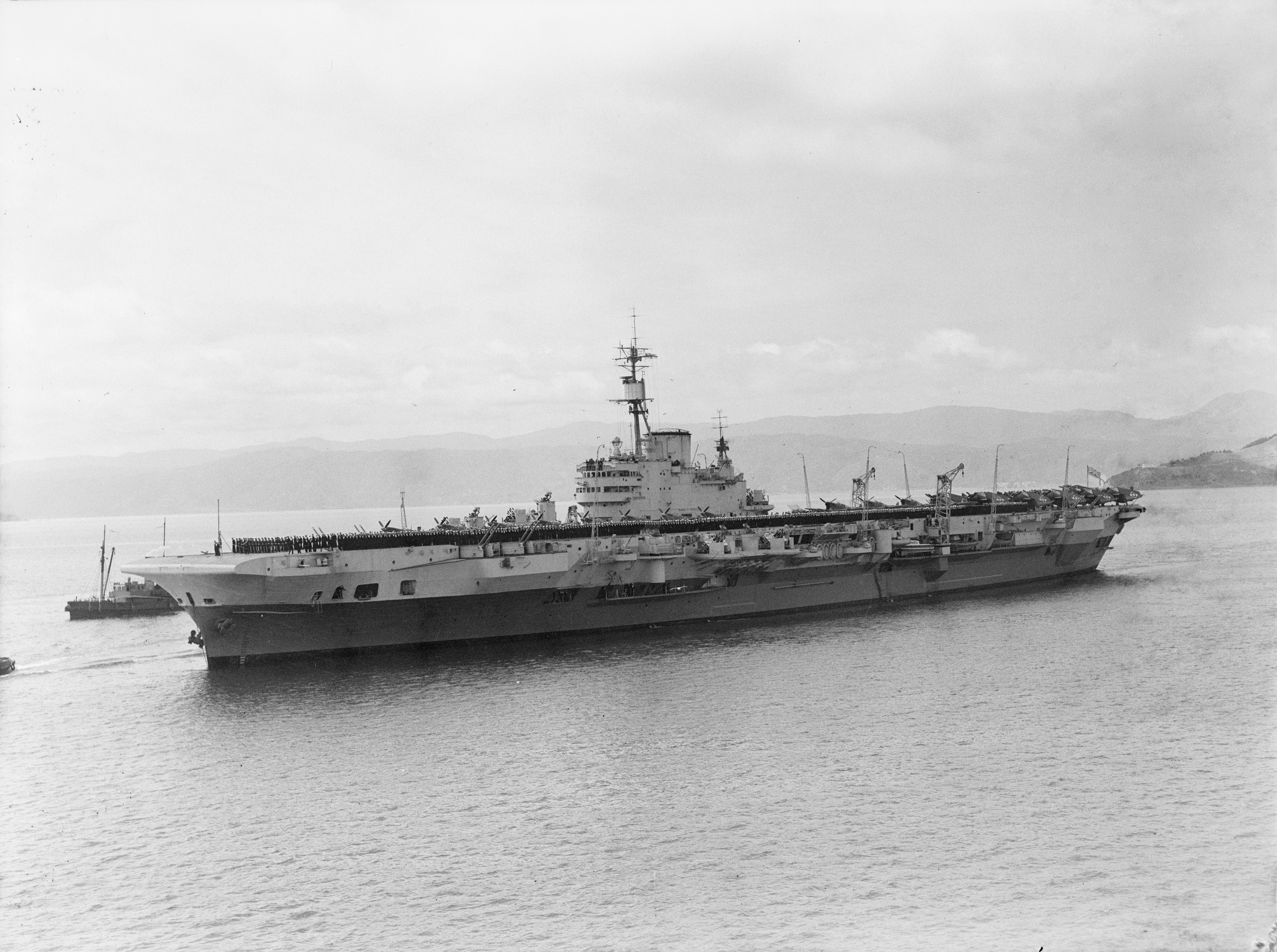
HMS Indefatigable in 1945

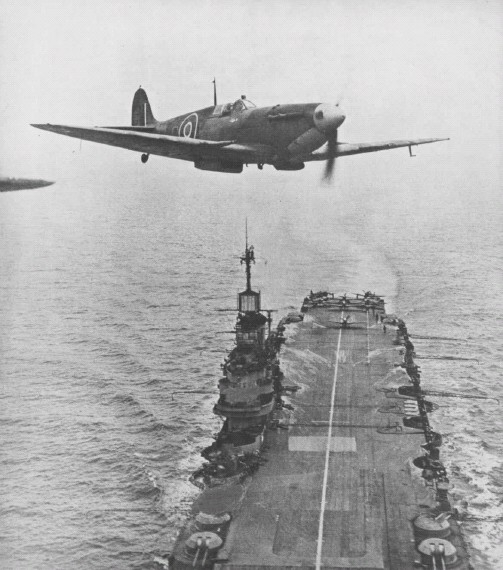
A Supermarine Seafire over an aircraft carrier

Hockley was commissioned as an officer in the Royal Naval Volunteer Reserve and was posted to the aircraft carrier HMS Indefatigable as a Supermarine Seafire fighter pilot with 24 Wing of the Fleet Air Arm. On 15 August 1945 he took off from the carrier leading five Seafires from 894 Squadron NAS tasked with defending Fairey Firefly and Grumman Avenger fighter bombers on a mission to attack airfields in the Tokyo Bay area of Japan. The 15 aircraft diverted to the alternate target which was a chemicals factory in Odaki Bay. Hockley's radio was not functioning and he bailed out of his aircraft after it was attacked by Mitsubishi Zero fighters, parachuting to the ground near the village of Higashimura (now Chōnan). The formation, now led by Victor Lowden, bombed the target and completed their mission.

== Surrender, captivity and execution ==
Hockley surrendered to an air raid warden who took him to the local civil defence HQ. The commander there handed him over to the 426th Infantry Regiment, stationed in Ichinomiya. At regimental headquarters the commanding officer, Colonel Tamura Tei'ichi, having heard Emperor Hirohito announce the Japanese surrender at 12 noon, called divisional headquarters for advice on what to do with the prisoner. The 147th Division's intelligence officer, Major Hirano Nobou, responded with words to the effect that he was to shochi-se (finish him off) in the mountains that night, despite the fact that Tamura had sought no authority to do so. Tamura claimed that he was shocked by the order, which he felt was "unkind", but he could not ignore an order from divisional command. He therefore told his adjutant, Captain Fujino Masazo, that Hockley had to be executed, adding that Fujino should do it so that no one could witness it. Fujino then ordered Sergeant Major Hitomi Tadao to move Hockley to regimental headquarters. There Hitomi was ordered by another officer to take six soldiers into the mountains to dig a grave with pickaxes and shovels. At about nine o'clock at night, nine hours after the Emperor had announced the surrender, Hockley was taken to the grave blindfolded, his hands were tied and he was told to stand with his back to the hole. He was then shot twice and rolled into the hole, where Fujino stabbed him in the back with a sword to ensure that he was dead. His body was later exhumed and cremated after Colonel Tamura began to fear that it might be found.

== Investigation and trial ==
Hockley's fate was revealed when Allied Occupation forces investigated and Fujino told the truth about what had happened, though Tamura had implored not to do so. Tamura, Hirano and Fujino were transferred to British custody and put on trial as war criminals in Hong Kong between 30 May and 13 June 1947. Tamura and Fujino cited superior orders in their defence, and Hirano maintained that he had ordered that Hockley be dealt with in accordance with intelligence service regulations and claimed he had not anticipated that Hockley would be killed. Following differing accounts of the precise wording of the orders, Tamura and Hirano were convicted, sentenced to death and hanged on 16 September 1947, and Fujino was sentenced to 15 years imprisonment. The case haunted Major Murray Ormsby (1919-2012), who was the military prosecutor at the trial, for he feared that Hockley's sacrifice would be forgotten. In 1995 he started placing a memorial notice in the Daily Telegraph on 15 August each year, the anniversary of Hockley's death.
