= Victor Lowden =

Scottish businessman and Royal Navy Fleet Air Arm fighter pilot (1923–1998)

Victor Soutar Lowden
- Born: 13 September 1923; Bangkok
- Died: June 13, 1998 (aged 74)
- Education: The High School of Dundee; Strathallan School; St John's College, Cambridge
- Occupations: businessman pilot
- Relatives: Gordon Lowden (brother)

Sub-lieutenant Victor Soutar Lowden DSC (13 September 1923 – 13 June 1998) was a Scottish businessman and Royal Navy Fleet Air Arm fighter pilot during World War II. On 15 August 1945 he flew as fighter escort with one of the last Allied bombing raids on Tokyo Bay, subsequently participating in the last dogfight of the war, for which he was honoured.

== Early life ==
Victor Lowden was born in Bangkok where his father was working as an accountant. He was educated at the High School of Dundee and Strathallan School in Scotland and St John's College, Cambridge. Lowden graduated with a BA (Hons) in economics, which had been accelerated over two years, so that he could join the Fleet Air Arm. His younger brother was Gordon Lowden.

== Naval career ==
Lowden joined the Fleet Air Arm in July 1942 and completed his basic flying training at RAF Sealand and RCAF Station Kingston in Canada. Whilst training at RNAS Henstridge Lowden came to the attention of Commander R Mike Crosley who described him as a 'natural'. He started flying the Supermarine Seafire in August 1943 and joined 899 Naval Air Squadron in Northern Ireland before embarking on HMS Khedive (D62).

Lowden's first sortie took place in June 1944 near Peterhead, Scotland as part of the Air Defence of Great Britain. He then flew sorties over France during Operation Dragoon and over the Aegean Sea in September 1944. In April 1945, 899 Naval Air Squadron arrived in Australia aboard HMS Chaser (D32). The squadron was dismantled and pilots and planes transferred to the fleet carrier HMS Indefatigable (R10).

In May 1945 he officially joined 887 Naval Air Squadron as part of the British Pacific Fleet in Task Force 37 off the Sakishima Islands, Japan. As part of Task Force 38 from July 1945, he was engaged in combat air patrols off Shikoku and Honshu. Ramrod operations continued over the next few weeks, with attacks on shipping and shore installations near Sendai.

=== Raid on Tokyo Bay ===
On 15 August 1945, the British launched an attack from HMS Indefatigable on Kisarazu Air Field in Tokyo Bay. Eight Supermarine Seafires were tasked with escorting six Grumman TBF Avengers to the target. Sub-lieutenant Fred Hockley was the lead fighter of five Seafires which provided close cover for the Avengers, whilst Lowden was lead fighter of three Seafires providing top cover. Due to bad weather the formation changed target to a chemical factory at Odaki Bay, south of Tokyo.

En route to the chemical factory, the formation was attacked from behind by a dozen Japanese Mitsubishi A6M Zero naval fighter aircraft. Hockley's radio failed and his Seafire hit instantly; taking to his parachute he was captured by the Japanese and executed.

The remaining Seafires entered the battle, which they won convincingly. The top cover Seafires, led by Lowden, downed six Zeroes. Lowden was credited with two destroyed, one shared and two damaged. Lowden's wingman, 'Taffy' Williams, destroyed one zero and shared another with him. The number three, 'Spud' Murphy, downed another two Zeroes.

At the same time, the close cover Seafires, were also engaged in battle. Hockley's wingman Ted Garvin, damaged one Zero and Don Duncan a further two. Randy Kay shot one down, probably another and damaged a third Zero.

Meanwhile, four Zeroes managed to attack the six Avenger bombers. One of the bombers was very badly damaged but remained in formation. Another Avenger claimed to have downed a Zero from their gun turret. All six bombers made it to the chemical factory and dropped their bombs.

Overall, the Seafires claimed seven destroyed, three probably destroyed and four damaged Zeroes. The Fleet Air Arm lost one Seafire and one Avenger. The damaged Avenger had deliberately ditched next to a destroyer on the return journey. Lowden's plane was the last to return to HMS Indefatigable.

Later that day, Emperor Hirohito, announced via a pre-recorded radio address that Japanese forces had surrendered to the Allies. Following the official surrender on 2 September 1945 in Tokyo Bay, HMS Indefatigable returned to Sydney.

On 11 September 1945, Lowden was awarded the Distinguished Service Cross for his actions over Tokyo Bay.

== Businessman ==
After the war, Lowden returned to Scotland and joined the graduate programme at Low and Bonar, the Dundee based textile and electronics group. He became chief executive of the company's textile division with responsibility for all their textile units worldwide. Lowden was also a former chairman of the Dundee Jute and Linen Merchants' Association.
