= 1700 Naval Air Squadron =

Non-flying squadron of the Royal Navy's Fleet Air Arm

- Squadron badge
- Active: 1944–1946; 2017–present
- Country: United Kingdom
- Branch: Royal Navy
- Type: Amphibian Bomber Reconnaissance Squadron (1944–1946); Non-flying squadron (2017–present)
- Role: Air Sea Rescue (1944–1946); Engineering, aviation and logistical support (2017–present)
- Part of: Fleet Air Arm
- Home station: RNAS Culdrose
- Mottos: Auxilio ad alta (Latin for 'Reaching the heights with help'); Ex mari messi (Latin for 'Our harvest is from the sea') (1944-46)
- Aircraft: See Aircraft flown section for full list. (1944-46)
- Battle honours: Burma 1945
- Website: Official website

Commanders
- Current commander: Lieutenant Commander Barry Smith, RN

Insignia
- Squadron Badge Description: Blue, issuant from a base barry wavy white and blue two cubit arms proper grasping a stockless anchor erect gold winged white (1945)

1700 Naval Air Squadron (1700 NAS), sometimes called 1700 Squadron, is a non-flying Fleet Air Arm (FAA) naval air squadron of the United Kingdom's Royal Navy (RN). On 31 October 2017, the Maritime Aviation Support Force (MASF) at RNAS Culdrose, Cornwall, was recommissioned as 1700 Naval Air Squadron. The unit provides personnel and naval aviation support to operations for Royal Navy ships and land bases globally. It serves as a comprehensive resource for specialised skills, fulfilling personnel needs and delivering naval aviation support to both maritime and terrestrial bases worldwide. Comprising medics, meteorologists, engineers, and aircraft controllers, the can deploy to any location around the globe within hours.

The squadron was formed in November 1944 at RNAS Lee-on-Solent, Hampshire, as an amphibian bomber reconnaissance squadron. It was equipped with the Supermarine Sea Otter, and the squadron joined the escort carrier HMS Khedive in January 1945 bound for Sulur in India. On arrival the Sea Otters were augmented with Supermarine Walrus amphibian aircraft.

The squadron's aircraft were distributed among the escort carriers of the Far East Fleet for air sea rescue and minesweeping duties. By April 1945 aircraft of the squadron were serving in the escort carriers HMS Stalker, HMS Hunter, HMS Khedive, HMS Emperor, HMS Ameer, HMS Attacker and HMS Shah. July saw operations at Car Nicobar, and off Phuket Island.

== History ==
=== Air Sea Rescue (1944-1946) ===
1700 Naval Air Squadron formed on 1 November 1944 as an Air Sea Rescue (ASR) squadron at RNAS Lee-on-Solent (HMS Daedalus), Hampshire, England. It was initially equipped with six Supermarine Sea Otter, an amphibious maritime patrol and air sea rescue aircraft, planned for operations in the Pacific theatre. The squadron personnel consisted commanding officer Lieutenant(A) A.B. Edgar, RNVR, six pilots and six observers. Upon finishing the work-up, the squadron boarded the Ruler-class escort carrier, HMS Khedive, on 8 January 1945, at the Aircraft Maintenance Yard, RNAMY Belfast (HMS Gadwall), County Londonderry, Northern Ireland. in preparation for the journey to southern India.

HMS Khedive reached Cochin, India, on 3 February. Following the unloading of their aircraft, 1700 Naval Air Squadron departed for RNAS Sulur (HMS Vairi) in Coimbatore, Southern India, located 120 miles (190 km) to the northeast, on 8 February. At this location, several Supermarine Sea Otter aircraft and multiple Supermarine Walrus amphibious maritime patrol aircraft, as the Supermarine Sea Otter had yet to receive clearance for landing on the deck, were provided by the nearby RN Aircraft Repair Yard (RNARY) at Coimbatore, HMS Garuda. On 4 April 1945, the squadron relocated to the Royal Air Force flying boat base in Koggala, Ceylon, where aircraft were embarked in small numbers in various escort carriers for Air Sea Rescue, including the Attacker-class escort carriers, HMS Stalker and HMS Hunter which were among the escort carriers that constituted the protective force for the amphibious assault on Rangoon, which took place on 2 May and was designated Operation Dracula. Additionally, HMS Hunter participated in an anti-shipping operation in the Andaman Sea, known as Operation Mitre, as well as in Operation Dukedom.

A detachment was embarked in the Ruler-class escort carrier, HMS Emperor during operations at Car Nicobar in July, and also minesweeping activities. Additional detachments were assigned to the escort carriers HMS Ameer, HMS Attacker, HMS Shah and HMS Khedive. After the Victory over Japan Day, the squadron was primarily stationed on land. 'A' Flight operated six Supermarine Sea Otter aircraft from RNAS Trincomalee (HMS Bambara), Ceylon, starting in November, while 'B' Flight had six Supermarine Walrus aircraft at RNAS Katukurunda (HMS Ukussa), Ceylon,. 'C' Flight occasionally operated from RNAS Sembawang (HMS Nabrock), Sembawang, Singapore, and a small number of Fairey Swordfish torpedo bomber aircraft and other aircraft types such as Grumman Avenger and Supermarine Seafire, were also flown during this period.

On 3 June 1946, 1700 Naval Air Squadron was absorbed into 733 Naval Air Squadron at RNAS Trincomalee (HMS Bambara).

=== Aviation Support Squadron (2017-present) ===
Previously known as the Maritime Aviation Support Force (MASF) and stationed at RNAS Culdrose (HMS Seahawk), Cornwall, the unit was reclassified as 1700 Naval Air Squadron on 2 October 2017. The official commissioning of the new squadron took place during a ceremony on 31 October with Lieutenant Commander C. Roberts, RN, serving as the commanding officer.

When a Fleet Air Arm aircraft or squadron is deployed to a ship or a distant operational base, it is the responsibility of the squadron to establish the required support facilities. 1700 Naval Air Squadron deploys specialised teams consisting of two to fifty personnel, guaranteeing that vessels and other remote operational bases are equipped with the essential support staff whenever and wherever needed. This squadron offers a comprehensive array of services, including engineering, aviation, and logistical support, as well as flight deck operations, warfare capabilities, and medical assistance.

== Aircraft flown ==
1700 Naval Air Squadron flew a number of different aircraft types, including:

- Supermarine Sea Otter ABR.I amphibious air sea rescue aircraft (November 1944 - June 1946)
- Supermarine Walrus amphibious maritime patrol aircraft (May 1945 - June 1946)
- de Havilland Tiger Moth trainer aircraft (November 1945 - January 1946)
- Stinson Reliant liaison and training aircraft (November 1945 - January 1946)
- Grumman Avenger Mk.II torpedo bomber (December 1945 - January 1946)
- Supermarine Seafire F Mk.IIc fighter aircraft (December 1945 - January 1946)
- Fairey Swordfish II torpedo bomber (January - June 1946)

== Battle honours ==
The battle honours awarded to 1700 Naval Air Squadron are:

- Burma 1945

== Naval air stations ==
1700 Naval Air Squadron operated mostly from a number of naval air stations of the Royal Navy overseas and a number of Royal Navy escort carriers, during its initial formation:

1944 - 1946

- Royal Naval Air Station Lee-on-Solent (HMS Daedalus), Hampshire, (1 November 1944 - 8 January 1945)
- HMS Khedive (8 January - 8 February 1945)
- Royal Naval Air Station Sollur (HMS Vairi), India, (8 February - 4 April 1945)
- Royal Air Force Koggala, Ceylon, (4 April - 26 May 1945)
  - HMS Stalker (Detachment 14 April - 24 June 1945)
  - HMS Hunter (Detachment 23 April - 12 June 1945)
- Royal Naval Air Station Trincomalee (HMS Bambara), Ceylon, (26 May 1945 - 3 June 1945)
  - HMS Khedive (Detachment 12 June - 18 September 1945)
  - HMS Ameer (Detachment 19 June - 20 July 1945)
  - HMS Emperor (Detachment 2–13 July 1945)
  - HMS Shah (Detachment 8–26 August 1945)
  - HMS Attacker (Detachment 16 August - 21 September 1945)
  - HMS Hunter (Detachment 6 August - 18 September 1945)
  - HMS Emperor (Detachment 17–30 October 1945)
- disbanded - (3 June 1946)

'A' Flight:

- Royal Naval Air Station Trincomalee (HMS Bambara), Ceylon, (17 November 1945 - 3 June 1946)

'B' Flight:

- Royal Naval Air Station Katukurunda (HMS Ukussa), Ceylon, (24 November 1945 - 3 June 1946)

'C' Flight:

- Royal Naval Air Station Sembawang (HMS Nabrock), Singapore, (8 - 20 November 1945)
- Royal Naval Air Station Katukurunda (HMS Ukussa), Ceylon, (20 November - 15 December 1945)
- Royal Naval Air Station Sembawang (HMS Nabrock) (15 December 1945 - 26 January 1946)
- transferred to 791 Naval Air Squadron (26 January 1946)

2017–present

- Royal Navy Air Station Culdrose (HMS Seahawk), Cornwall, (2 October 2017 – present)

== Commanding officers ==
List of commanding officers of 1700 Naval Air Squadron with date of appointment:

1944 - 1946

- Lieutenant(A) A.B. Edgar, RNVR, from 1 November 1944
- Lieutenant(A) J.A. Gossett, RNVR, from 25 January 1946
- disbanded - 3 June 1946

2017–present

- Lieutenant Commander C. Roberts, RN, from 2 October 2017
- Lieutenant Commander R. Turrell, RN, from March 2022
- Lieutenant Commander B.J. Smith, RN, from 17 July 2024

Note: Abbreviation (A) signifies Air Branch of the RN or RNVR.
