= MDMF =

MDMF may refer to:

- Merlin Depth Maintenance Facility
- Multiple Data Message Format, a function within Caller ID
