= 791 Naval Air Squadron =

Inactive flying squadron of the Royal Navy's Fleet Air Arm

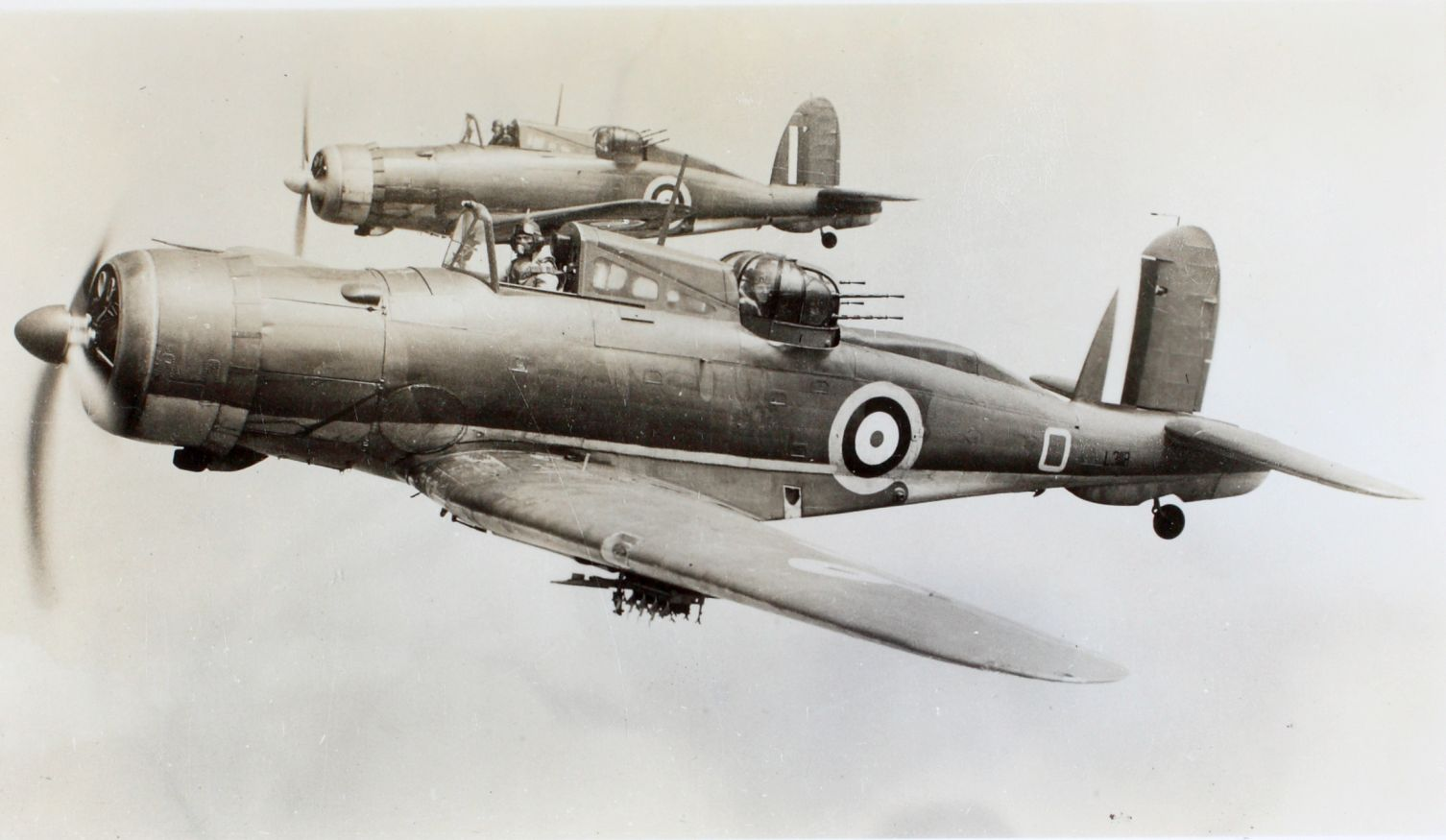
- Blackburn Roc, of the type used by 791 NAS
- Active: 1940–1944; 1945–1947
- Disbanded: 16 June 1947
- Country: United Kingdom
- Branch: Royal Navy
- Type: Fleet Air Arm Second Line Squadron
- Role: Air Target Towing Unit; Fleet Requirements Unit
- Size: Squadron
- Part of: Fleet Air Arm
- Home station: See Naval air stations section for full list.
- Aircraft: See Aircraft flown section for full list.

Insignia
- Identification Markings: A8A+ (up to 1944) single letters (1945-1947)

791 Naval Air Squadron (791 NAS), sometimes called 791 Squadron, is an inactive Fleet Air Arm (FAA) naval air squadron of the United Kingdom’s Royal Navy (RN) which last disbanded at RNAS Sembawang, Singapore, in June 1947.

It formed as an Air Target Towing Unit, at RNAS Arbroath (HMS Condor), in Scotland, in October 1940. It operated various types of aircraft for target towing duties, used to support air gunnery training and practice. The squadron disbanded in December 1944, at RNAS Arbroath.

It reformed at RNAS Trincomalee (HMS Bambara), in British Ceylon, (now Sri Lanka), in November 1945, as a Fleet Requirements Unit. The squadron moved to RNAS Sembawang (HMS Simbang), in Singapore, in December 1945, ferried via the escort carrier, HMS Smiter. It also operated a Communications Flight and an Air-Sea Rescue Flight, as well as undertaking anti Mosquito spraying duties.

== History ==
=== Air Target Towing Unit (1940-1944) ===
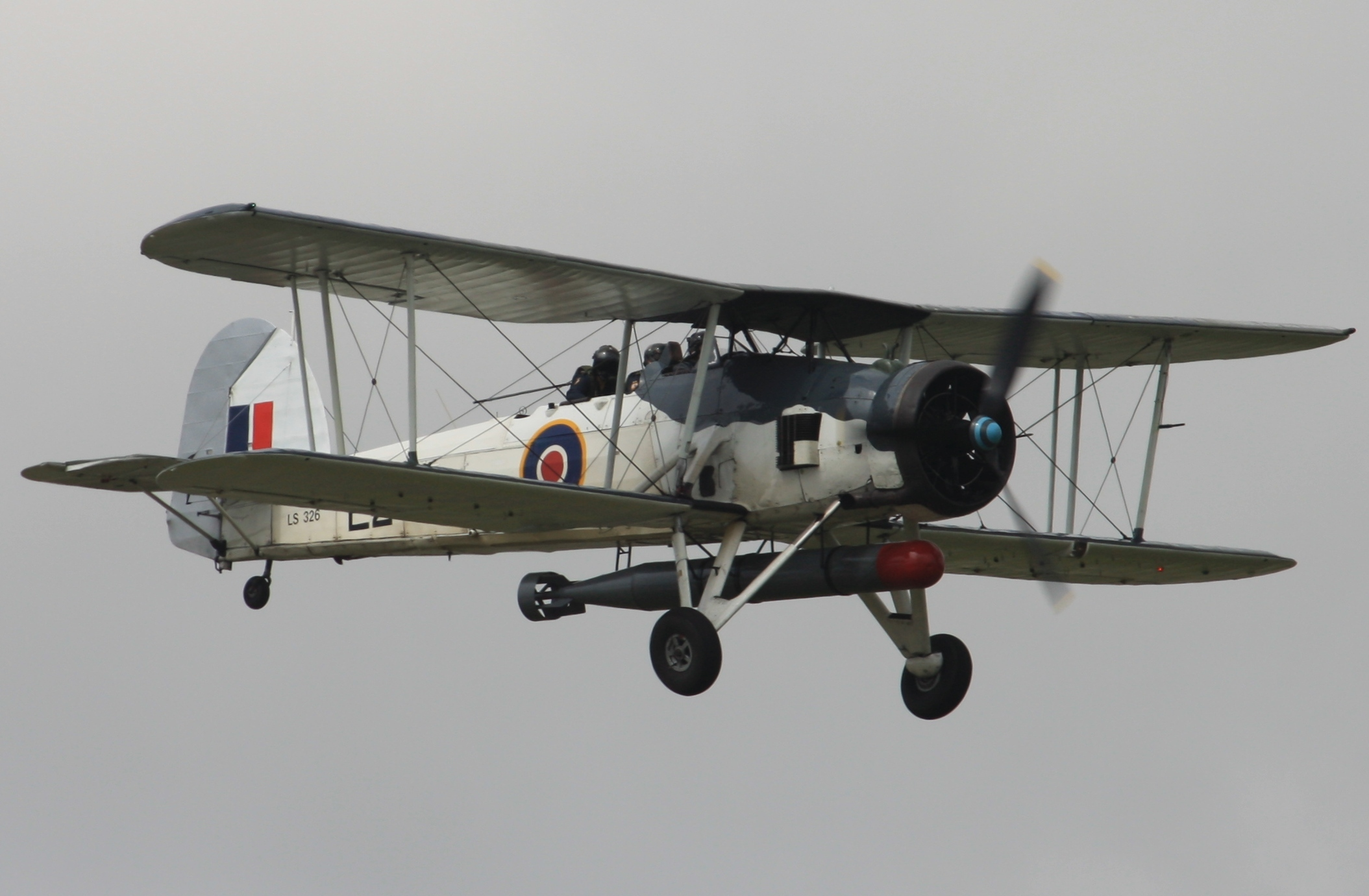
Fairey Swordfish II; an example of the type used by 791 NAS.

791 Naval Air Squadron formed as an Air Target Towing Unit, on the 15 October 1940, at RNAS Arbroath (HMS Condor), located near Arbroath in East Angus, Scotland. The squadron was initially equipped with two Blackburn Roc, a carrier-based turret-armed fighter aircraft, for target towing.

It operated various types of aircraft while at Arbroath, in March 1941 Fairey Albacore, a single-engine biplane torpedo bomber aircraft, were received. One year on, in March 1942, the squadron started using Blackburn Skua, a carrier-based dive bomber/fighter aircraft and Gloster Sea Gladiator single-seat fighter biplane aircraft, fitted with arrestor hooks, and these were followed by Fairey Swordfish biplane torpedo bomber aircraft in the April. October 1942 saw the arrival of Supermarine Spitfire, a single-seat fighter aircraft, to the squadron and one year later, in October 1943, Hawker Sea Hurricane, a single-seat fighter aircraft, were received. By the end of that year the squadron received a later variant of Swordfish and in April 1944, it started using the TT III variant of the Boulton Paul Defiant, which was a dedicated turret-less target tug.

791 Naval Air Squadron disbanded as an Air Target Towing Unit, on the 10 December 1944, at RNAS Arbroath.

=== Fleet Requirements Unit (1945-1947) ===
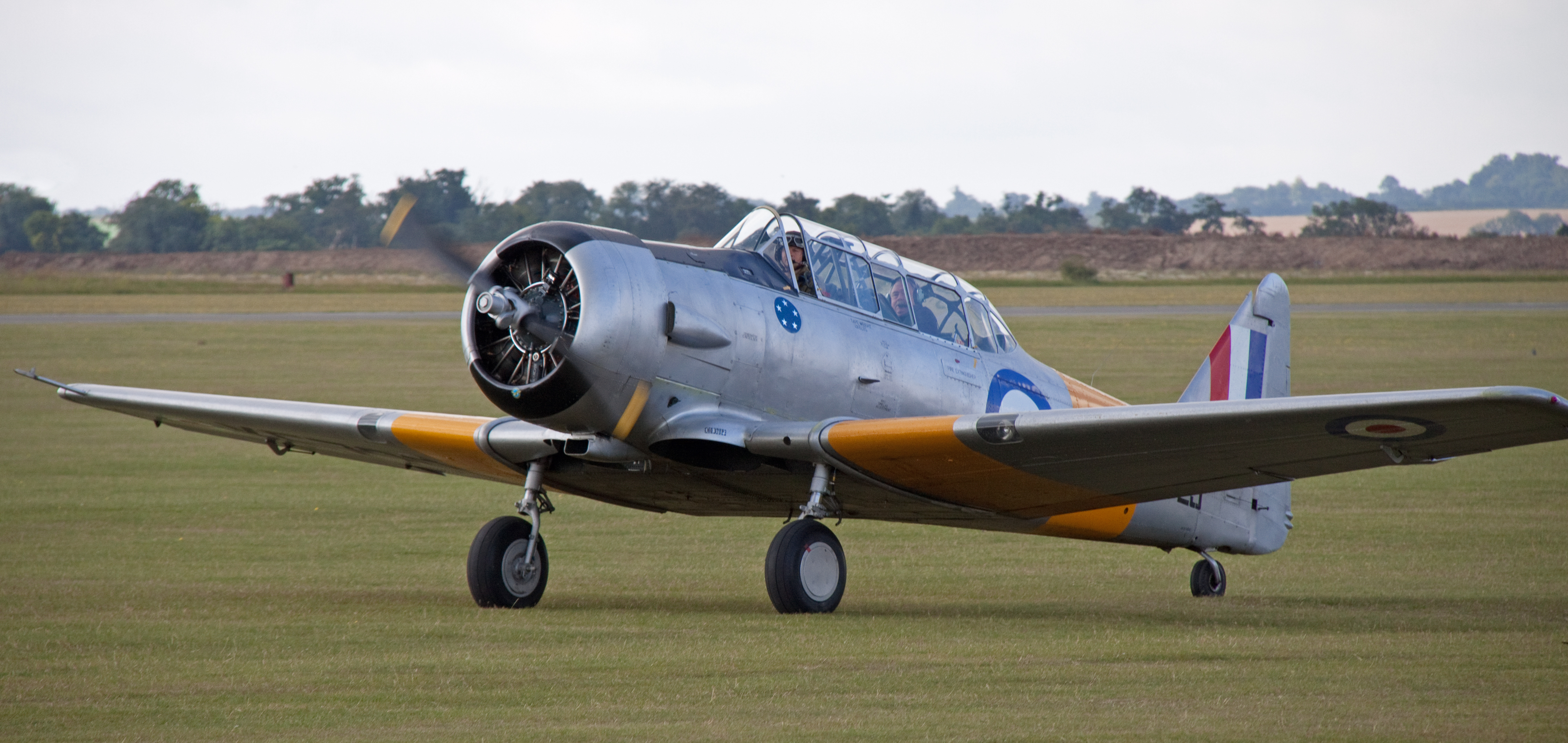
North American Harvard; an example of the type operated by 791 NAS.

791 Naval Air Squadron reformed as a Fleet Requirements Unit, on the 1 November 1945, at RNAS Trincomalee (HMS Bambara), located in China Bay in eastern British Ceylon (Sri Lanka). It was equipped with six Vought F4U Corsair, an American fighter aircraft, six Vultee Vengeance, an American dive bomber aircraft, and a single North American Harvard, an American single-engined advanced trainer aircraft. In December, the squadron moved to RNAS Sembawang (HMS Simbang), located at Sembawang, in the northern part of Singapore. HMS Smiter, a Ruler-class escort carrier, was tasked with ferrying aircraft of 888 Naval Air Squadron, to the newly reopened Naval air station in Singapore. They were joined by the Vought Corsair, Vultee Vengeance and North American Harvard aircraft of 791 Naval Air Squadron. The two squadrons disembarked, from Smiter, to RNAS Sembawang, on the 27 December 1945.

April 1946 saw the arrival of two Beech Expediter, an American twin-engined light aircraft. These were followed by three Taylorcraft Auster, British military liaison and observation aircraft, in the October. November 1946 saw the withdrawal of the Corsair aircraft, however, in December, two Supermarine Seafire, a navalised version of the Supermarine Spitfire, were received. The squadron also operated a Communications Flight and an Air-Sea Rescue flight. Australian Vengeance aircraft were acquired and used for DDT spraying against Mosquito flies.

791 Naval Air Squadron disbanded as a Fleet Requirements Unit, on the 16 June 1947, at RNAS Sembawang.

== Aircraft flown ==
791 Naval Air Squadron has operated a number of different aircraft types, including:

- Blackburn Roc fighter aircraft (October 1940 - March 1944)
- Fairey Albacore torpedo bomber (March 1941)
- Blackburn Skua dive bomber and fighter aircraft (March 1942 - March 1944)
- Gloster Sea Gladiator fighter aircraft (March 1942)
- Fairey Swordfish I torpedo bomber (April 1942 - December 1944)
- Supermarine Spitfire Mk I fighter aircraft (October 1942 - May 1943)
- Hawker Sea Hurricane Mk IIC fighter aircraft (October 1943)
- Hawker Sea Hurricane Mk IA fighter aircraft (December 1943 - January 1944)
- Hawker Sea Hurricane Mk IB fighter aircraft (December 1943 - January 1944)
- Fairey Swordfish II torpedo bomber (December 1943 - January 1944)
- Boulton Paul Defiant TT Mk III target tug (April 1944 - June 1944)
- Vought Corsair Mk IV fighter bomber (November 1945 - November 1946)
- Vultee Vengeance II dive bomber (December 1945 - December 1946)
- North American Harvard IIB advanced trainer aircraft (December 1945 - May 1947)
- Vultee Vengeance IV dive bomber (December 1945 - December 1946)
- Beech Expediter trainer, transport and utility aircraft (April 1946 - April 1947)
- Taylorcraft Auster V liaison aircraft (October 1946 - June 1947)
- Supermarine Seafire F Mk XV fighter aircraft (December 1946 - June 1947)

== Naval air stations and aircraft carriers ==
791 Naval Air Squadron operated from a number of naval air stations of the Royal Navy, both in the UK and overseas and a Royal Navy escort aircraft carrier:

- Royal Navy Air Station Arbroath (HMS Condor), Angus, (15 October 1940 - 10 December 1944)
- Royal Naval Air Station Trincomalee (HMS Bambara), Ceylon, (1 November 1945 - 23 December 1945)
- HMS Smiter (ferry 23 December 1945 - 27 December 1945)
- Royal Naval Air Station Sembawang (HMS Simbang), Singapore, (27 December 1945 - 16 June 1947)
- disbanded - (16 June 1947)

== Commanding officers ==
List of commanding officers of 791 Naval Air Squadron with date of appointment:

1940 - 1944

- Lieutenant Commander(A) L. Gilbert, RNVR, from October 1940
- Lieutenant Commander(A) K.B. Brotchie, RNVR, from December 1941
- Lieutenant J.C.M. Harman, RN, from September 1942
- Lieutenant Commander(A) C.A. Crighton, RNVR, from May 1943
- Lieutenant Commander(A) A.P.T. Pierrsene, RNVR, from April 1944
- disbanded - 10 December 1944

1945 - 1947

- Lieutenant Commander(A) C.M.T. Hallewell, RN, from November 1945
- Lieutenant(A) R.A. Shilcock, RN, from August 1946
- Lieutenant(A) D.M. Jeram, RN, from April 1947
- disbanded - 16 June 1947

Note: Abbreviation (A) signifies Air Branch of the RN or RNVR.
