= Sembawang Air Base =

Military airbase of the Republic of Singapore Air Force

- Pangkalan Udara Sembawang (Malay) 三巴旺空軍基地 (Chinese) செம்பவாங் வான்படைத் தளம் (Tamil)
- Sembawang in Singapore
- Badge of the Sembawang Air Base

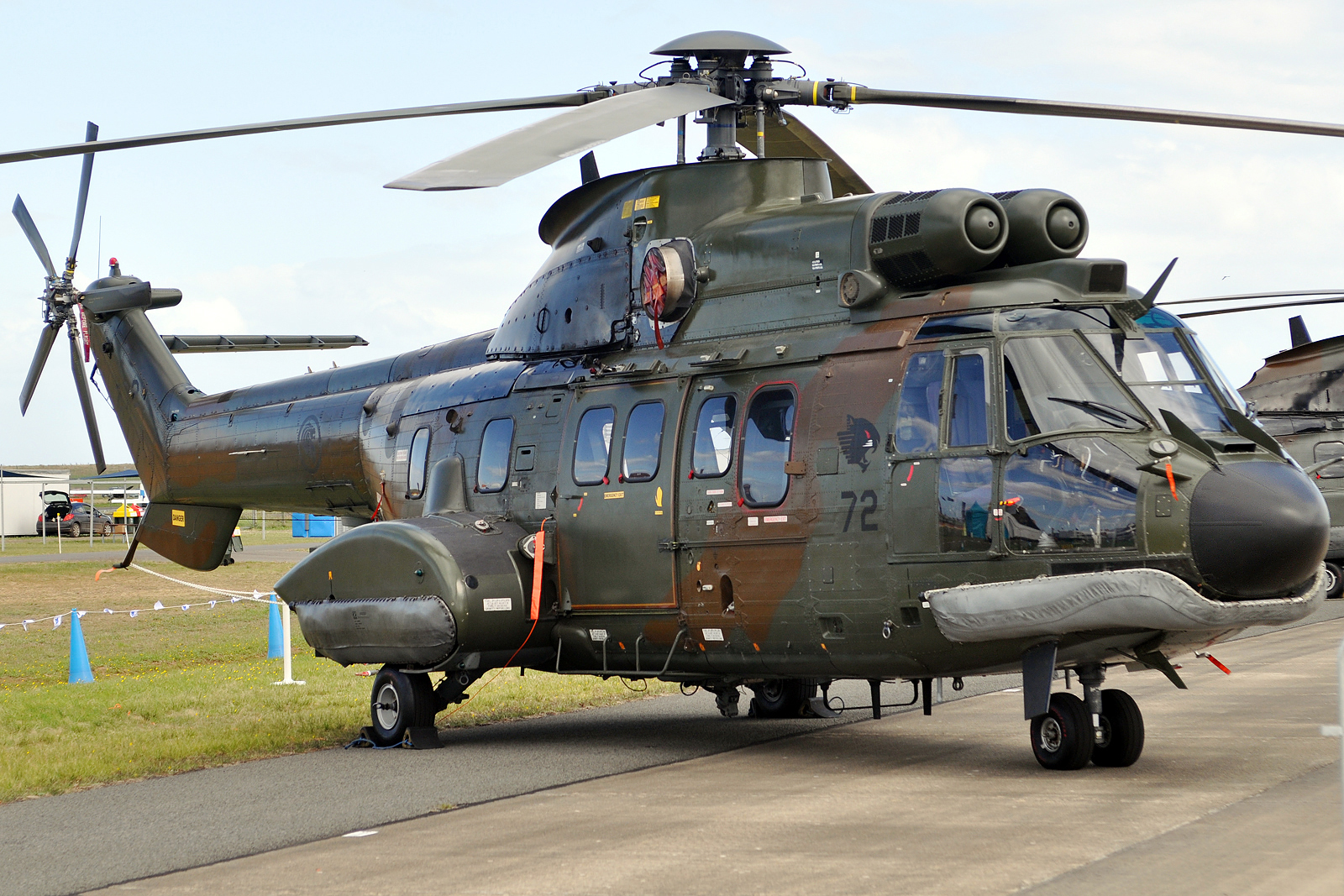
- A Eurocopter AS532M1 Cougar, c/n 2368 of 126 Squadron based at Sembawang, Singapore

Site information
- Type: Military airbase
- Owner: Government of Singapore
- Operator: Republic of Singapore Air Force
- Condition: Operational

Location
- Coordinates: 01°25′31″N 103°48′46″E

Site history
- Built: 1937–1938
- In use: 1939 – present

Garrison information
- Occupants: Flying units: 120 Squadron; 123 Squadron; 124 Squadron; 125 Squadron; 126 Squadron; 127 Squadron

Airfield information
- Identifiers: ICAO: WSAG
- Elevation: 25.6 metres (84 ft) AMSL
Runways
Direction	Length and surface
05/23	914 metres (2,999 ft) Asphalt (for helicopter use only)
~~04/22~~	~~1,907 metres (6,257 ft)~~ ~~Asphalt~~
- Source: CAAS - Civil Aviation Authority of Singapore

The Sembawang Air Base (ICAO: WSAG) is a military airbase of the Republic of Singapore Air Force (RSAF) located at Sembawang, in the northern part of Singapore. The base motto is Swift and Resolute.

Before Singapore's independence from the United Kingdom, it was a Royal Air Force station known as RAF Sembawang as well as the Royal Navy airbase, known as Royal Naval Air Station Sembawang (or RNAS Sembawang), commissioned as HMS Simbang, to the carrier pilots of the Fleet Air Arm (attached to the Eastern Fleet based in Singapore). The pilots used it for rest and refit whenever an aircraft carrier of the Royal Navy berthed at the nearby HMNB Singapore for refuel and repairs, which also housed the largest Royal Navy dockyard east of Suez up to the time of UK forces' withdrawal from Singapore in 1971.

After the Japanese capture of Singapore during World War II, the Imperial Japanese Navy Air Service took over the two RAF stations of Sembawang and Seletar. Singapore was split into north–south spheres of control, and the Imperial Japanese Army Air Force took over RAF Tengah. It was not until September 1945 that the two airfields reverted to British control following the Japanese surrender. RAF Sembawang was a key part of Britain's continued military presence in the Far East (along with the three other RAF bases in Singapore: RAF Changi, RAF Seletar, RAF Tengah) during the critical period of the Malayan Emergency (1948–1960), the Brunei Revolt in 1962 and the Indonesia–Malaysia confrontation (1962–1966).

== History ==
=== Beginnings (1934-1940) ===
In the years 1934 and 1935, a section of the Bukit Sembawang Rubber Estate located on Singapore Island was acquired by the Air Ministry for the purpose of establishing a grass airfield intended for the Royal Air Force. The necessary approval for this construction was granted in 1936, leading to the commencement of work by British Army engineers in the subsequent year. The airfield was originally designed to accommodate two RAF bomber squadrons, however, it was later reassigned to the Admiralty. Plans were then made to convert the site into an airbase and aircraft repair yard, aimed at supporting a proposed Eastern Fleet that would include up to four Royal Navy fleet carriers. By May 1940, the airfield was nearly operational and was once again transferred, this time to the Royal Australian Air Force.

=== RAAF Station Sembawang (1940-1941) ===
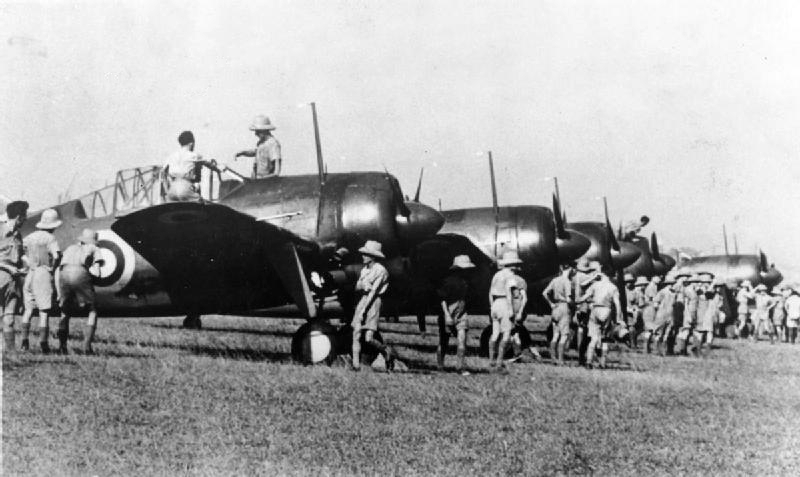
Brewster Buffalo Mk I for the re-equipment of Nos. 21 and 453 Squadrons RAAF, being inspected by RAF personnel at Sembawang airfield, Singapore

July and August of 1940, saw the Royal Australian Air Force's Nos. 1 and No. 8 Squadrons stationed here with twelve Lockheed Hudson light bomber aircraft each, but with No. 8 squadron departing in November. In early 1941, No. 21 Squadron RAAF relocated from RAF Seletar, Singapore, to re-equip with Brewster Buffalo fighter aircraft, briefly conducting operations from RAAF Station Sembawang before being sent to Malaya. Additionally, No. 453 Squadron RAAF, which also utilised Buffalo fighter aircraft, arrived in August 1941 and remained operational at this location until their deployment to Malaya in mid-December 1941.

=== Imperial Japanese Navy Air Service (1942-1945) ===
On 8 December 1941, the Japanese military launched an invasion of Malaya. Subsequently, Singapore succumbed to the Japanese forces and surrendered on 15 February 1942, after the air base was partially burned by the retreating British to deny its use to the Japanese.

In September 1945, British naval advance parties landed to reclaim the air base. Hundreds of abandoned Mitsubishi Zeros and "Betty" bombers were left on the airfield layout.

=== HMS Nabrock (1945) ===
HMS Nabrock was a Royal Navy (RN), Mobile Operational Naval Air Base (MONAB) at the naval air station at Sembawang. HMS Nabrock was also known as MONAB IX and Royal Naval Air Station Sembawang (or RNAS Sembawang).

The initial contingent of MONAB IX officially commissioned Royal Naval Air Station Sembawang as HMS Nabrock on 5 October 1945. To ensure the provision of essential equipment and infrastructure for the operation of the station, MONAB IX was designated to establish its presence and commence naval aviation and support facilities in the area.

Upon the arrival of the advance party tasked with assuming command of the airbase and facilitating its preparation for reopening, they discovered the station was intricately interwoven with a network of tunnels and foxholes, exhibiting a significant degree of disarray. Approximately ninety Mitsubishi A6M "Zero" fighter aircraft were stationed at the airfield, accompanied by around seven-hundred Japanese personnel. The Japanese had been engaged in efforts to construct a runway, employing prisoners of war in the process. A number of steamrollers were found abandoned on what subsequently became known as the "Jap runway". Efforts to restore the station to operational status commenced without delay, utilising Japanese prisoners of war for tasks such as filling up the tunnels and the foxholes, in addition to the construction of a 1,400 yards (1,300 m) by 50 yards (46 m) pierced steel planking runway.

Personnel and equipment for Mobile Naval Air Base IX had commenced assembly on 1 June 1945, at RNAS Middle Wallop (HMS Flycatcher), Hampshire, UK. This base was designated as the second Fighter Support Mobile Naval Air Base (MONAB) and its technical components were Mobile Maintenance (MM) No. 8, Mobile Servicing (MS) Nos. 15 & 16 and Mobile, Storage & Reserve (MSR) No. 10, all of which provided support for Vought Corsair Mk II & IV, Grumman Hellcat F Mk. II and Supermarine Seafire F Mk III, L Mk III & F Mk XV. MONAB IX was established as an independent command under the designation HMS Nabrock on 1 August 1945, with Captain J.S.C. Salter DSC, OBE, RN, assuming command.

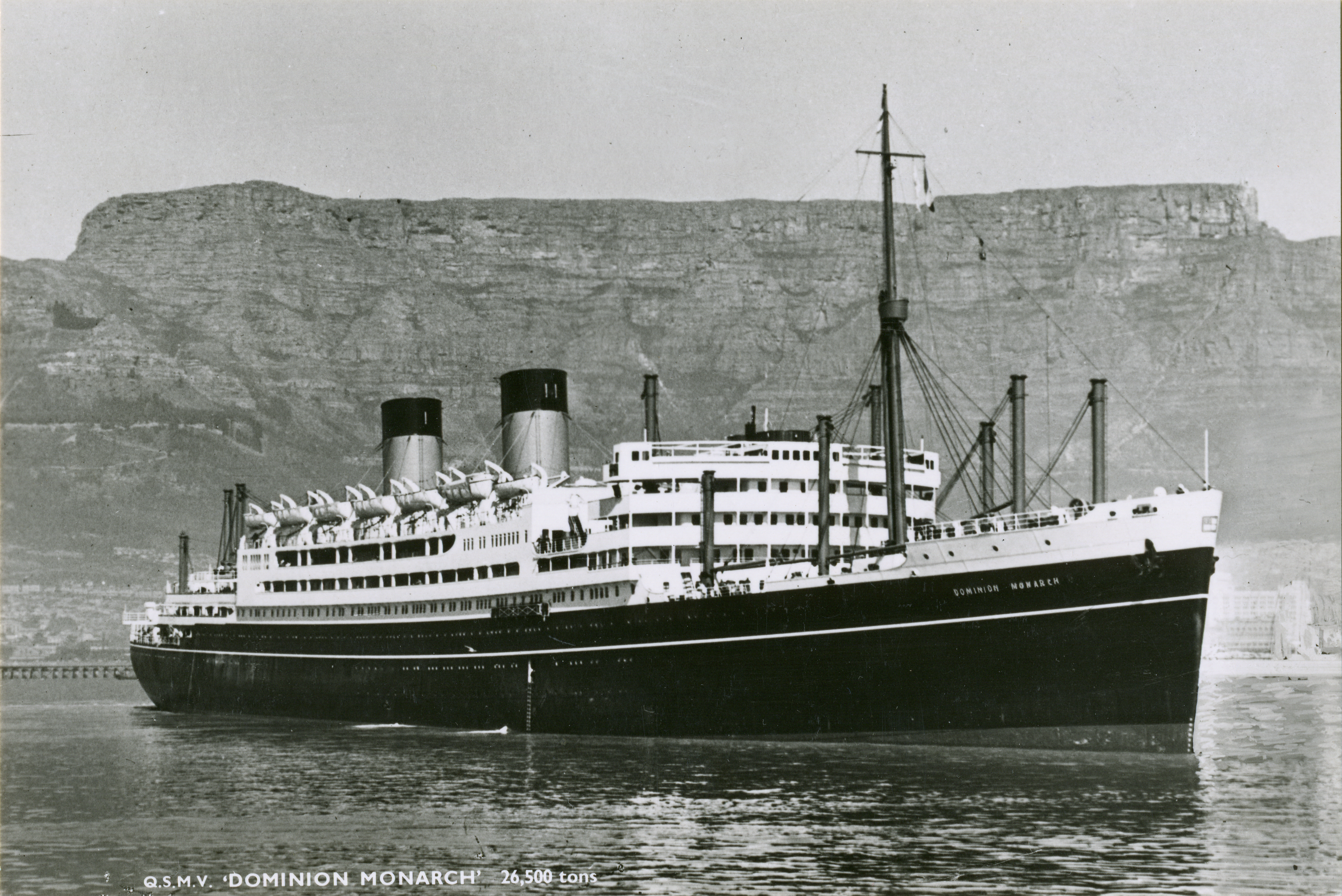
MV Dominion Monarch

The personnel of MONAB IX reached Liverpool from HMS Flycather and boarded the troopship MV Dominion Monarch, which then set sail for Sydney, Australia, via the Suez Canal. Upon arrival, the MONAB personnel were transferred to HMS Golden Hind, where they awaited the assignment of an operational base. During this interim period, they were temporarily accommodated in tents at Warwick Farm Racecourse. It was determined that the unit would be deployed similarly to MONAB VIII, with plans to reopen the airfield at Sembawang on the Island of Singapore. Three advance parties travelled by aircraft, while the remaining members of the unit, constituting the main body, were to journey by sea, embarking on the Australian troopship MV Largs Bay.

On 1 November, the primary contingent of personnel aboard the MV Largs Bay arrived in Singapore. They initiated the process of assembling crated United States manufactured aircraft, a significant number of which were Grumman Hellcat fighter aircraft. After assembly, these aircraft were transported by road to a nearby dockyard, where they were loaded onto aircraft carriers for disposal at sea. This procedure was in accordance with the stipulations of the Lend-Lease Act policy with the United States, which facilitated the provision of these aircraft. Following the conclusion of the war, the United Kingdom was obligated to either return any remaining equipment or compensate for it. However, the United States was not inclined to reclaim the aircraft due to an existing surplus, and the UK lacked the financial resources to make payment. Consequently, the destruction of the aircraft was deemed the most viable solution.

On 15 December 1945, HMS Nabrock was decommissioned at RNAS Sembawang, coinciding with the re-commissioning of the naval air station as HMS Simbang. Although the Mobile Naval Air Base (MONAB) effectively came to an end, the personnel remained the same, and efforts to construct airframes for disposal persisted.

==== Commanding officers ====
List of commanding officers of HMS Nabrock with date of appointment:

- Captain J.S.C. Salter DSC, OBE, RN, from 1 August 1945

==== Units based at HMS Nabrock ====
List of units associated with MONAB IX, in support of disembarked fighter squadrons:

Function

- Support for disembarked fighter squadrons, an air-sea rescue squadron and a Fleet Requirements Unit

Aviation support components

- Mobile Maintenance (MM) No. 8
- Mobile Servicing (MS) No. 15
- Mobile Servicing (MS) No. 16
- Mobile, Storage & Reserve (MSR) No. 10

Aircraft type supported

- Vought Corsair Mk II & IV
- Fairey Firefly I
- Grumman Hellcat F. Mk. I & II
- Supermarine Seafire F Mk III, L Mk III & F Mk XV

=== HMS Simbang (1945-1947) ===
The apparatus from the decommissioned MONAB IX was retained at RNAS Sembawang (HMS Simbang), serving as the foundation for an upgraded reserve MONAB. This reserve was kept in storage under 'care and maintenance', ready for reactivation if necessary. The original components were augmented with additional equipment and vehicles salvaged from other MONABs that had recently been decommissioned in Australia. This reserve unit remained in storage at RNAS Sembawang until the 1950s.

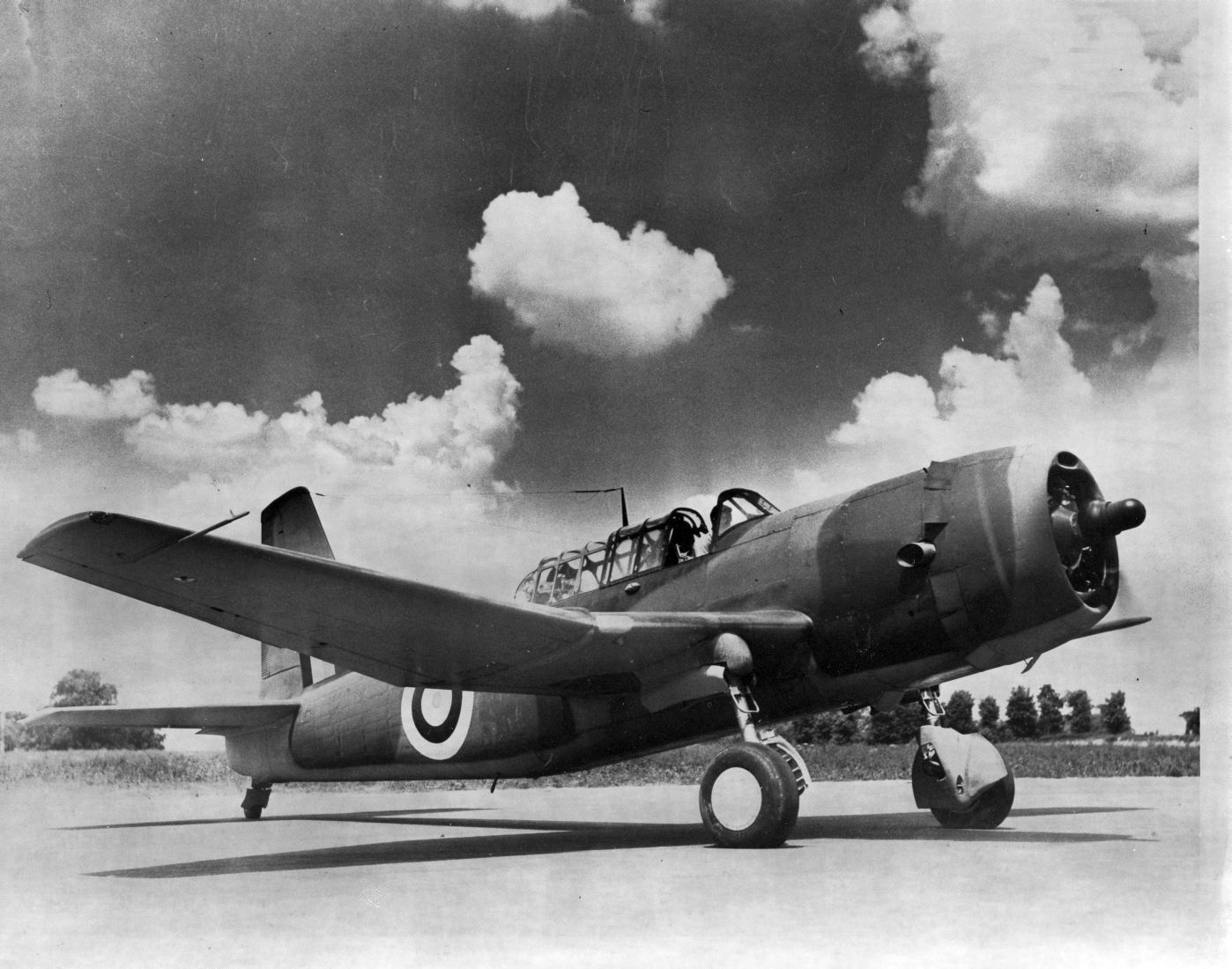
Vultee Vengeance, as used by 791 Naval Air Squadron

On 27 December 1945, two Fleet Air Arm squadrons were deployed from HMS Smiter to conduct operations from HMS Simbang. The first, 791 Naval Air Squadron, functioned as a Fleet Requirements unit, equipped with a diverse array of aircraft including Vultee Vengeance target tug aircraft, Vought Corsair fighter aircraft and North American Harvard. This squadron remained the primary flying unit at HMS Simbang until its disbandment on 16 June 1947. Additionally, Grumman Hellcat aircraft from 888 Naval Air Squadron, the RN Photographic Reconnaissance Squadron, were also disembarked, tasked with performing airborne survey duties in the region during peacetime.

At the conclusion of January 1946, the only remaining unit at the station was the Fleet Requirements Unit. On 26 January, 791 Naval Air Squadron integrated 'C' Flight of 1700 Naval Air Squadron and by 29 January personnel from 888 Naval Air Squadron left for the United Kingdom to disband upon their arrival, while their aircraft were kept at HMS Simbang. After the completion of the aircraft assembly and disposal operations, the station transitioned to serve as an Aircraft Holding Unit, providing support for aircraft carriers operating in the Far East and for disembarked squadrons.

From May 1946 it also managed a communications flight utilising a couple of Beech Expeditor transport aircraft. The initial squadron to arrive disembarked on 26 September 1946, when 802 Naval Air Squadron, comprising Supermarine Seafire F MK XV fighter aircraft, flew ashore from the Colossus-class aircraft carrier, HMS Glory. This squadron remained until 14 November when they re-embarked on the British Light Fleet Carrier, HMS Venerable.

Subsequently, on 18 November 806 Naval Air Squadron, with Supermarine Seafire F Mk XV, and 837 Naval Air Squadron, operating with Fairey Firefly FR.1 aircraft, disembarked from HMS Glory, remaining until 6 and 9 December respectively, before returning to the aircraft carrier. Both squadrons made a return on 17 May 1947, when HMS Glory docked in HMNB Singapore, and they re-embarked on 19 June as the aircraft carrier departed for the UK after being succeeded by HMS Theseus The latter began disembarking her two squadrons on 7 June starting with Supermarine Seafire F Mk X equipped 804 Naval Air Squadron, followed by Fairey Firefly FR.1 aircraft from 812 Naval Air Squadron on 10 June.

At this juncture, the station was facing potential closure. On 16 June, 791 Naval Air Squadron was disbanded and HMS Theseus's squadrons re-embarked on 21. On 1 October 1947, a new CO took command of HMS Simbang with the appointment of Captain P.W. Burnett, DSO, DSC, RN, . Subsequently, the station was decommissioned and transitioned to 'care and maintenance' on 31 December 1947.

=== RAF Sembawang (1948-1949) ===
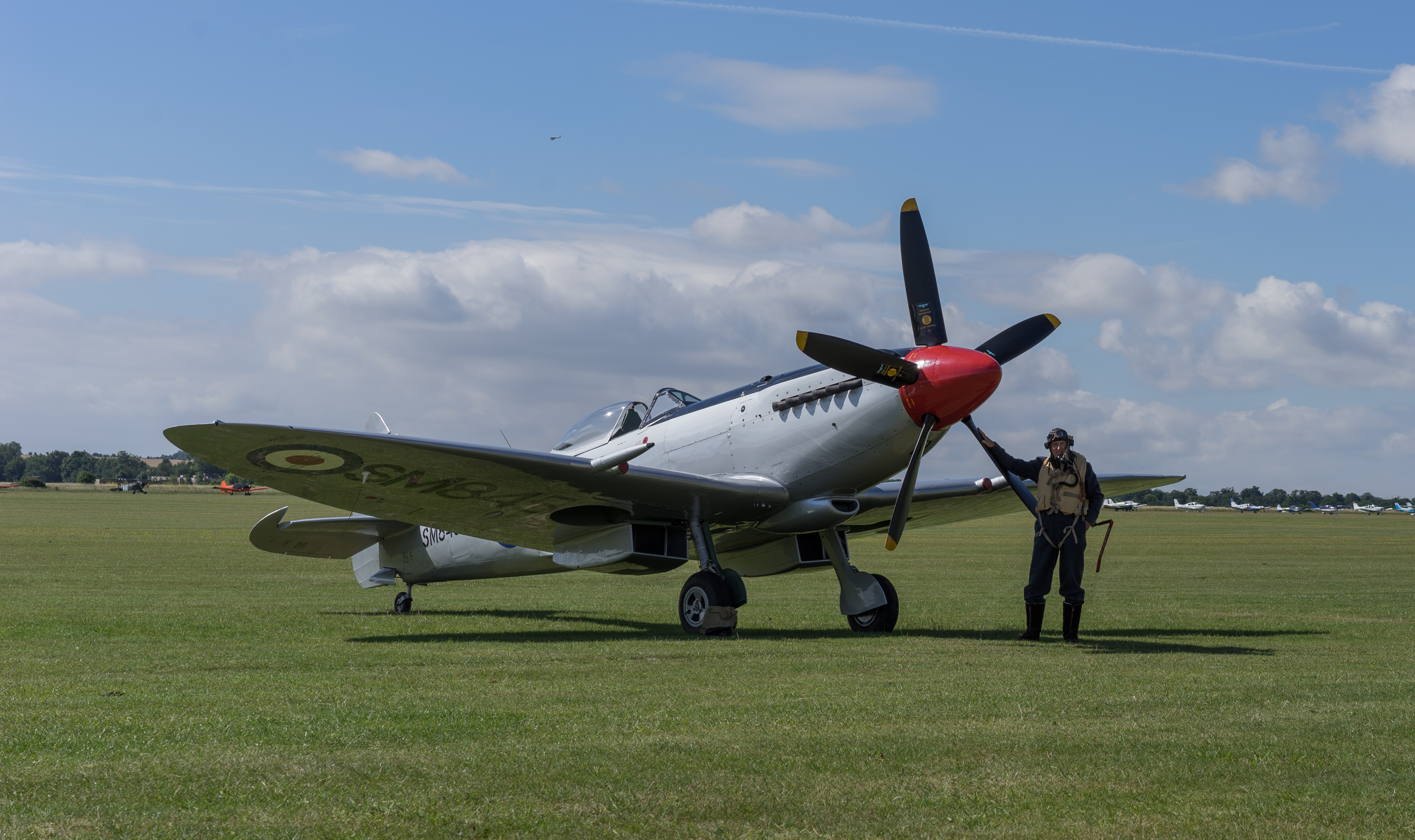
Supermarine Spitfire Mk FR.XVIIIe SM845, in No. 28 Squadron RAF markings

The station was officially transferred to the Royal Air Force (RAF) on a temporary basis on 16 January 1948. The first RAF unit to establish a presence at the station was No. 60 Squadron, which arrived on 24 with Supermarine Spitfire FR Mk 18 fighter reconnaissance variant. This was followed by No. 1914 Air Observation Post Flight, which operated Auster AOP aircraft and was elevated to squadron status, reformed as No. 656 Squadron in June 1948, as well as No. 28 Squadron also with Supermarine Spitfire FR Mk 18. Both fighter squadrons were actively engaged in operations in the Kuala Lumpur area, with detachments from Sembawang conducting strikes against Communist insurgents beginning in July 1948. By late summer 1949, the RAF began to scale back its operations at Sembawang.

No. 28 Squadron relocated to RAF Kai Tak, Hong Kong, on 11 May, while 60 Squadron moved to RAF Tengah, in Singapore, at the end of August. Subsequently, preparations were made for the station's return to Royal Navy (RN) control, with the RAF's presence reduced to a 'care and maintenance' status on 15 September 1949.

=== Royal Navy returns (1950-1957) ===
At the beginning of October 1949, the initial Royal Navy squadrons arrived back at Sembawang, marked by the disembarkation of the 13th Carrier Air Group, which included Supermarine Seafire FR Mk.47 fighter reconnaissance aircraft from 800 Naval Air Squadron and Fairey Firefly FR.I fighter reconnaissance aircraft from 827 Naval Air Squadron, from the British Light Fleet Carrier, HMS Triumph, on 3 October. On 26 October 1949, the aircraft repair ship and light aircraft carrier, HMS Unicorn, docked in Singapore, where it disembarked an advance team to Sembawang for the purpose of setting up an Aircraft Holding Unit and conducting test flights. On 1 November, the 13th Carrier Air Group returned to HMS Triumph, subsequently disembarking back to the airbase on 8 December. The airbase at Sembawang was officially handed back to the Royal Navy in January 1950, and HMS Simbang was re-commissioned there.

It became clear that HMS Unicorn was not appropriate for functioning as a facility to repair aircraft, leading to the decision in June 1950, to use Sembawang as an Air Repair Yard. The workshops at Sembawang were expanded to accommodate an Air Repair Yard, capable of processing twenty aircraft monthly. Additionally, the Aircraft Handling Unit (AHU) was equipped with storage for eighty aircraft and facilities for test flying. The station was also capable of supporting a single Carrier Air Group.

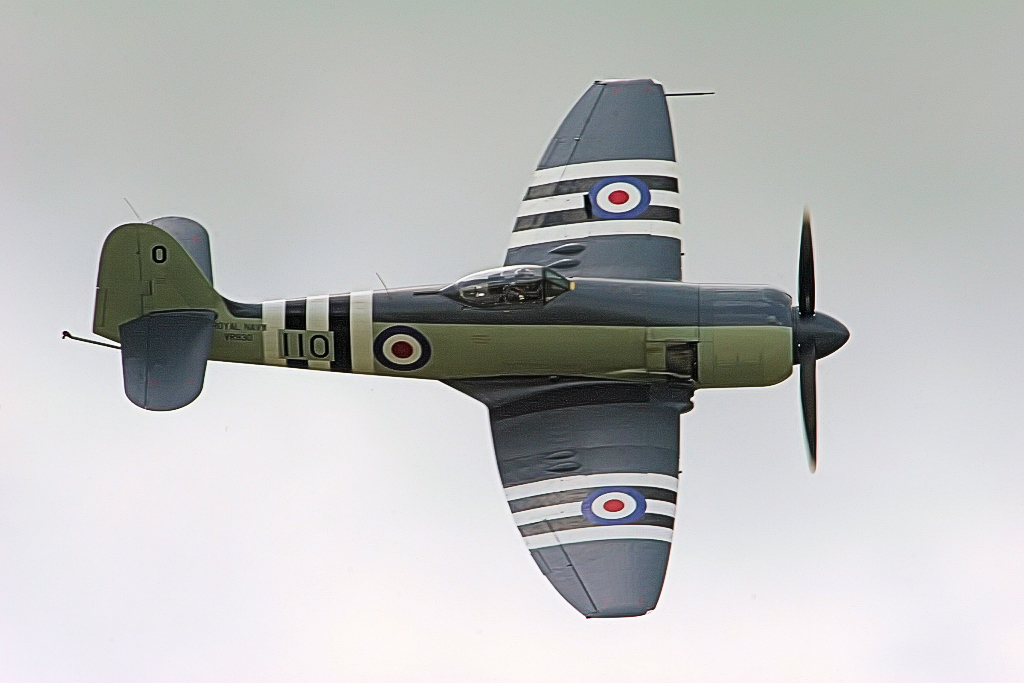
Hawker Sea Fury FB.11

In April 1950, Nos. 1902, 1907, 1911 Flights of No. 656 AOP Squadron, of the Royal Air Force, commenced operations with the Auster AOP Mk 5 aircraft. On 12 September 1950, 807 Naval Air Squadron disembarked from HMS Theseus, equipped with Hawker Sea Fury FB.11 fighter aircraft. The transition to Hawker Sea Fury squadrons marked a shift away from the previously utilised Supermarine Seafire squadrons. During the same month, a shipment consisting of fifteen Hawker Sea Fury aircraft, along with an additional fifteen Fairey Firefly aircraft, arrived aboard HMS Warrior, a Colossuss-class aircraft carrier, to establish a reserve at the Aircraft Handling Unit (AHU). Subsequently, 807 Naval Air Squadron re-embarked on the 20.

The inaugural Transport Support Squadron of the Royal Navy, 848 Naval Air Squadron, deployed its Westland Whirlwind HAS.21 anti-submarine helicopters to HMS Simbang on 8 January 1953. This unit was to assist in the ongoing efforts for the Malayan Emergency. On 2 February, it was joined by No. 194 Squadron of the Royal Air Force, which was reconstituted at Sembawang from the Far East Casualty Evacuation Flight, which was disbanded that day. This squadron was equipped with nine Westland Dragonfly HC.2 helicopters, serving as a short-range transport unit. Together with 848 Naval Air Squadron, they established No. 303 (Helicopter) Wing, marking the United Kingdom's first operational helicopter wing. No. 303 Wing subsequently relocated to RAF Kuala Lumpur on 20 May.

The subsequent arrival at RNAS Sembawang was 816 Squadron of the Royal Australian Navy, which disembarked on 2 November from HMAS Sydney. They conducted a direct exchange of their twelve Fairey Firefly AS.Mk 6 anti-submarine aircraft for AS.Mk 5 anti-submarine variant, completing the swap before re-embarking on the 5.

HMS Warrior, during its expedition to the Far East, disembarked its two squadrons on 12 May 1954. 811 Naval Air Squadron, equipped with Hawker Sea Fury FB.11 aircraft, and 825 Naval Air Squadron, operating Fairey Firefly AS.Mk 5 aircraft, were both part of this deployment. 811 Naval Air Squadron returned aboard on 2 June after augmenting its fleet of aircraft, while 825 Naval Air Squadron remained stationed at RNAS Sembawang, subsequently transferring to RAF Tengah on 16 August. Also on that date, 811 Naval Air Squadron disembarked once more from HMS Warrior as the vessel was required to aid with refugee rescue operations, from Vietnam. On 23 September, 811 Naval Air Squadron squadron re-embarked in HMS Warrior.

On 10 March 1956, a detachment of four Fairey Gannet Anti-submarine warfare (ASW) aircraft from 825 Naval Air Squadron flew ashore from the Centaur class light fleet carrier, HMS Albion, for a brief period before re-embarking on 15 March. Beginning in late March, detachments from 848 Naval Air Squadron commenced visits to the station, with four Westland Whirlwind helicopters arriving on 26 March, three on 14 May, and a final group of four on 31 May. Subsequently, Fairey Gannet aircraft from 820 Naval Air Squadron, which had been stationed on the lead ship of her class, HMS Centaur, disembarked on 4 April and departed on 20. On 18 December, 848 Naval Air Squadron, the final operational naval unit in the region, disbanded, and RNAS Sembawang was placed on notice for transition into Care and Maintenance.

=== Care and Maintenance (1957-1962) ===
On 1 April 1957, HMS Simbang was decommissioned as an autonomous command and subsequently assigned as a tender to, HMS Terror, Singapore Naval Base. It was placed under a status of 'Care and Maintenance by operation'. The Fleet Air Arm returned to Sembawang when on 1 November 1958, 820 Naval Air Squadron re-established a temporary presence for a ten-day period, during which they disembarked five Westland Whirlwind HAS.7 anti-submarine helicopters, from the Centaur-class carrier HMS Albion. Subsequently, in December 1958, the Fleet Photographic Unit commenced operations at the airbase. Then in 1959 all Westland Whirlwind helicopters belonging to 820 Naval Air Squadron were disembarked ashore on 26 March, however, the squadron was formally disbanded on May 8.

The establishment of the station now aimed to serve as a base for the Royal Marines, along with a supporting helicopter squadron. Initial efforts to enhance the galleys and accommodation commenced in early 1959, and by January 1960, an advance contingent from 42 Commando had arrived at the station. On 13 March 1960, Westland Wessex HAS.1 anti-submarine helicopters from 815 Naval Air Squadron disembarked from the aircraft carrier HMS Albion. Their deployment lasted just over a month, concluding with their re-embarkation on 16 May.

In June, the primary contingent of 42 Commando, along with a reconstituted 848 Naval Air Squadron, now equipped with Westland Whirlwind HAS.7 helicopters, disembarked from the aircraft carrier HMS Bulwark, which was the Royal Navy's first vessel converted for commando operations. This squadron commenced its operations ashore on June 7 and was designated to operate from HMS Bulwark while returning to RNAS Sembawang during the ship's stay in Singapore, with re-embarkation occurring on July 15.

Subsequently, 815 Naval Air Squadron returned ashore from HMS Albion for another brief period on 12 July, re-embarking on 28. Both 815 and 848 Naval Air Squadrons disembarked on 17 and 15 September respectively, before re-embarking on 3 October. 848 Naval Air Squadron made a return for a week starting 22 October and was back at the airbase by early December, where it remained over Christmas 1960. On 31 December, the Westland Wessex HAS.1 anti-submarine helicopter equipped 814 Naval Air Squadron, disembarked from the Centaur-class aircraft carrier HMS Hermes to Sembawang.

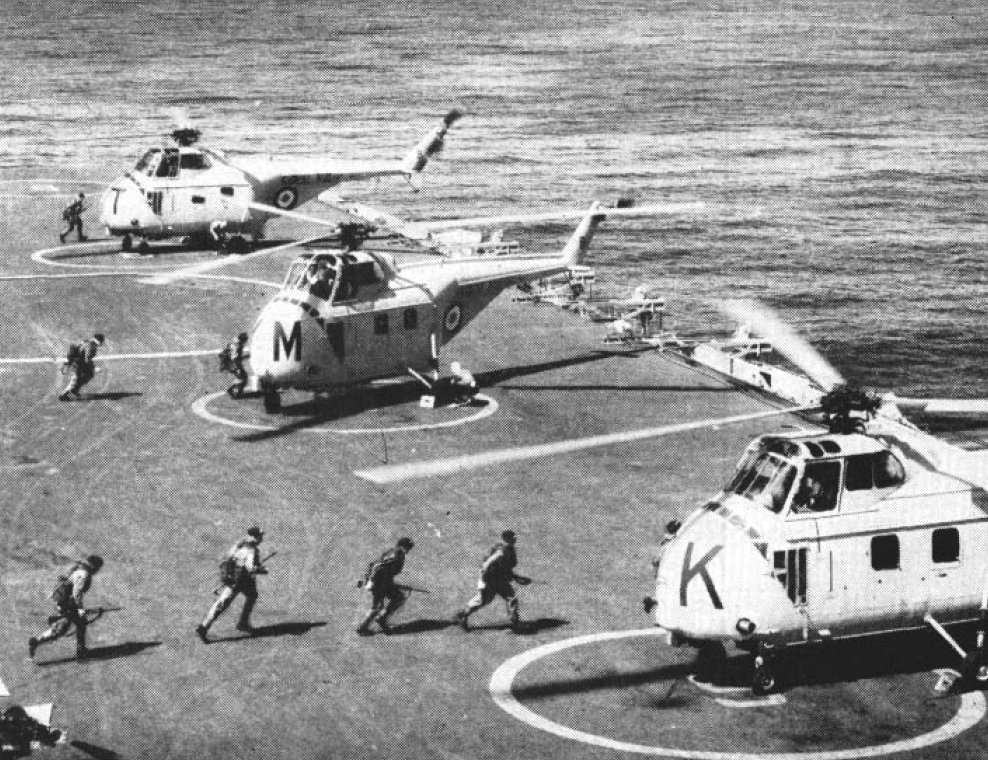
Westland Whirlwind helicopters of 848 Naval Air Squadron aboard the Royal Navy commando carrier HMS Bulwark, circa 1961

The essential modifications needed to support the Royal Marines were finalised by March 1961, leading to the relocation of the headquarters of 3 Commando Brigade to the station. On 22 March, 848 Naval Air Squadron disembarked from HMS Bulwark, followed by the return of fixed-wing aircraft operations to Sembawang on 29, when 825 Naval Air Squadron arrived from the Illustrious-class aircraft carrier, HMS Victorious, equipped with Fairey Gannet AS.4 anti-submarine warfare aircraft. After a two-week deployment, they re-embarked on 11 April. Subsequently, 848 Naval Air Squadron re-joined HMS Bulwark on 18 April.

825 Naval Air Squadron made its return for a month-long deployment on 9 May and subsequently re-embarked in HMS Victorious, on 14 June. Meanwhile, 848 Naval Air Squadron disembarked from HMS Bulwark on 12 June, but their stay was brief, lasting only eight days, upon their return to Sembawang on 31 July, they remained ashore for a duration of four months. The final disembarkation of 825 Naval Air Squadron from HMS Victorious occurred on 15 September, and the departure of these Fairey Gannet aircraft on 4 October signified the conclusion of fixed-wing naval aviation operations at Sembawang.

In 1962, 848 Naval Air Squadron made its return to Sembawang on 22 March. Subsequently, 815 Naval Air Squadron arrived on 12 April, with its Westland Wessex HAS.1 helicopters disembarking from the Audacious-class aircraft carrier HMS Ark Royal, only to re-embark on 23. On 18 April, 848 Naval Air Squadron re-joined HMS Bulwark for a brief deployment, disembarking to Sembawang on 19 May. On 27 June, 815 Naval Air Squadron disembarked from HMS Ark Royal on the 27 for another short visit, re-embarking on 11 July, but returned once more on 26 July. Additionally, 848 Naval Air Squadron re-embarked on 10 July for a month-long deployment, returning on 6 August.

No. 11 Flight, part of No. 656 Squadron AAC, which holds the distinction of being the station's longest-serving unit, was transferred to Kluang, Malaya, at the conclusion of August 1962.

=== Re-commissioning of HMS Simbang (1962-1971) ===
On 4 September 1962 the airbase at Sembawang was officially re-commissioned, HMS Simbang. On this same date, both 815 and 848 Naval Air Squadrons arrived at the station. 848 Naval Air Squadron stayed for a week before re-embarking on HMS Bulwark, while 815 Naval Air Squadron re-joined HMS Ark Royal on the 29 of the month. Throughout October and November, there was a cessation of naval flying activities, although the improvements to the control tower were completed in November as part of ongoing updates to the station. Flying operations resumed in December, with 814 Naval Air Squadron disembarking from HMS Hermes on 21.

814 Naval Air Squadron re-embarked on HMS Hermes on 5 January 1963, marking the beginning of a significant year that also saw the initial deployments from 845 and 846 Naval Air Squadrons to HMS Simbang. On 10 January, 846 Naval Air Squadron disembarked four Westland Wessex HAS.1 anti-submarine helicopters, while a detachment from 845 Naval Air Squadron flew ashore from HMS Albion. Subsequently, 846 Naval Air Squadron re-embarked on 1 February and the remaining 845 Naval Air Squadron disembarked on 12. Additionally, 814 Naval Air Squadron flew in from HMS Hermes once more, on the 25.

On 17 April 845 Naval Air Squadron returned to HMS Albion and 814 Naval Air Squadron joined the Royal Australian Navy's aircraft carrier HMAS Melbourne on 20. In May, 846 Naval Air Squadron returned to RNAS Sembawang, with a detachment of six helicopters on the 17 for a brief stay before departing again on 24 June. The only activity in June involved 814 Naval Air Squadron, which disembarked from HMS Hermes on the 13 and returned to the carrier on the 28. During the summer of 1963, HMS Ark Royal disembarked the anti-submarine squadron, 815 Naval Air Squadron, which spent two deployments at RNAS Sembawang, from 11 to 24 July and 14 to 26 August.

In February 1964, 815 Naval Air Squadron arrived, disembarking from HMS Centaur on 12 and subsequently re-embarking on the 1 March. This squadron was succeeded by 814 Naval Air Squadron, which disembarked from HMS Victorious for a short period, between 23 March and 8 April. 815 Naval Air Squadron made its final disembarkation from HMS Centaur between 16 and 25 November. Meanwhile, HMS Victorious re-embarked 814 Naval Air Squadron on 21 November, following its deployment to RNAS Sembawang on 23 September.

In 1965, initiatives were started to enhance RNAS Sembawang, transforming it into a base dedicated to supporting commando operations, with the intention of establishing it as a Fleet Amphibious Forces Base. 820 Naval Air Squadron disembarked from the Audacious-class aircraft carrier, HMS Eagle with eight Westland Wessex HAS.1 anti-submarine warfare helicopters between January 14 and 26. Subsequently, on 5 March, 845 Naval Air Squadron disembarked from HMS Bulwark until the end of March. Additionally in March, Westland Wessex HAS.31A, the Royal Australian Navy's anti-submarine warfare model, equipped 817 Squadron RAN, disembarked from HMAS Melbourne.

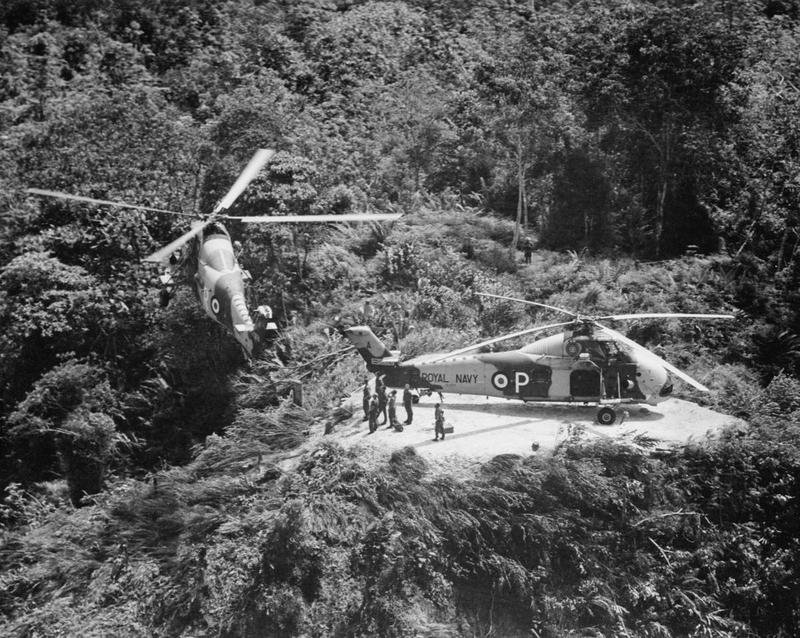
Westland Wessex of 848 Naval Air Squadron drop a troop of Royal Marines to establish a landing zone in the Borneo jungle.

A detachment from 848 Naval Air Squadron disembarked from HMS Albion on 28 April, which was now operating with the Westland Wessex HU.5 troop transporter helicopter. This unit was organised into a Headquarters Flight and four subordinate Flights designated as 'A', 'B', 'C', and 'D'. The entire unit was not fully assembled at RNAS Sembawang until 19 June. While the Headquarters Flight remained stationed at RNAS Sembawang, the four subordinate Flights were deployed to operate from jungle bases located in Sibu, Nanga Gaat, and Bario in Borneo, as well as at Labuan in the Federal Territories of Malaysia, starting from 23 May.

On 15 July, 815 Naval Air Squadron disembarked once more, this time from HMS Ark Royal, and subsequently re-embarked on 3 August. They returned again on 4 September for an additional two-week period. Meanwhile, 820 Naval Air Squadron spent a week on land starting from 12 October, before re-joining HMS Eagle on 19 October. They returned on 6 November for twelve days. 815 Naval Air Squadron arrived on 20 October and remained until 6 December.

The completion of construction to accommodate a second Royal Marines unit, as part of the new Fleet Amphibious Forces Base for the Far East, occurred in March 1966, marking the introduction of 40 Commando.

The amalgamation of the Royal Marines Brigade Flight, 40 Commando Air Troop, 42 Commando Air Troop, and 29 Commando Regiment Royal Artillery Air Troop commenced in Sembawang, Singapore, in 1967. Subsequently, on 12 August 1968, No. 3 Commando Brigade Air Squadron was established at RNAS Sembawang to provide support to the Royal Marines. The squadron's initial equipment consisted of fourteen Westland Sioux AH.1 light observation helicopters.

In March 1969, the Royal Marines received enhanced air support with the reformation of 847 Naval Air Squadron at RNAS Sembawang on 14 of the month. This squadron was established from a segment of 848 Naval Air Squadron and was equipped with eight Westland Wessex HU.5 transport helicopters. Subsequently, the newly formed 847 Naval Air Squadron embarked on HMS Albion for a brief embarkation on 16 May, returning to the airbase on the 28.

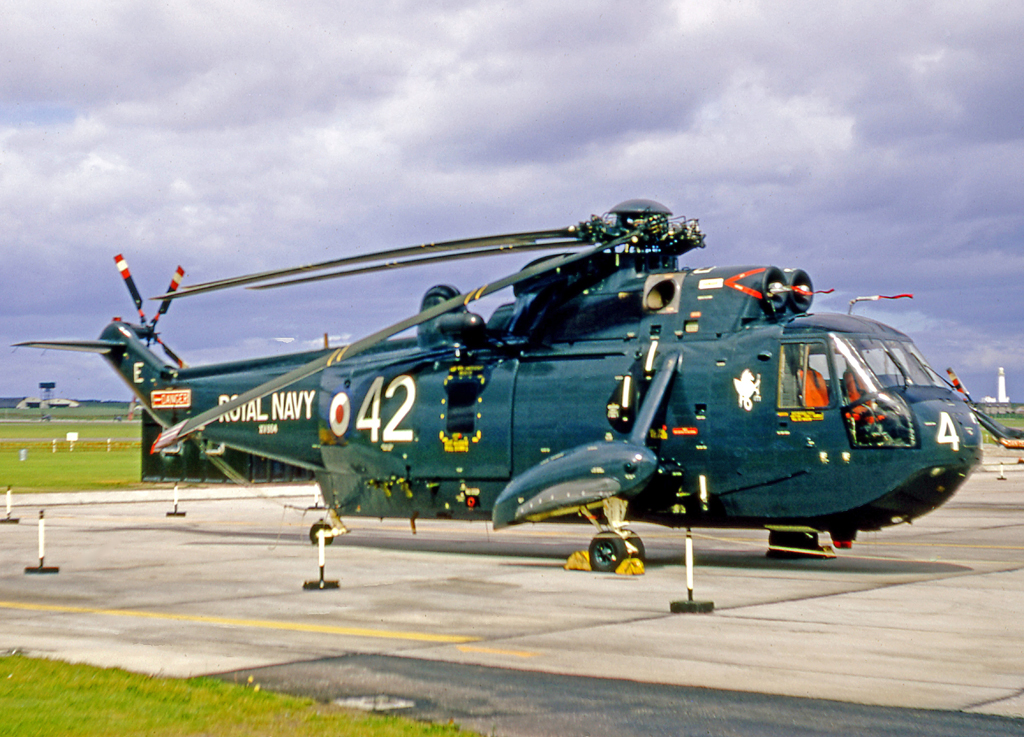
Westland Sea King HAS.1 of 826 Naval Air Squadron

On 1 September 1971, the management of RNAS Sembawang was transferred to the Singapore Air Defence Command. Concurrently, the facilities associated with the Fleet Amphibious Forces Base were reassigned to the ANZUK Support Group. The decommissioning of HMS Simbang occurred on 30 September 1971.

Fleet Air Arm squadrons maintained their operations from Sembawang until October. Notably, 'A' Flight of 848 Naval Air Squadron had previously boarded the amphibious warfare ship HMS Intrepid on 27 August and the remainder of the squadron departed Sembawang for the last time on 17 September, when they boarded HMS Albion.

The final operations at Sembawang Air Base were conducted by the Westland Sea King HAS.1 anti-submarine helicopters from 826 Naval Air Squadron, which disembarked from HMS Eagle on September 20 and re-embarked on October 5.

=== Sembawang Air Base ===
The installation was renamed as Sembawang Air Base (SBAB) in 1971 upon its transfer to the Singapore Air Defence Command (SADC). Between 1971 and 1976, Sembawang served as a base for British, Australian, and New Zealand military forces, operating under the framework of the Five Power Defence Arrangements (FPDA).

The SIAI-Marchetti SF.260 was developed as a successor to the older Cessna 172K. This transition facilitated the formation of the Standards Squadron within the Flying Training School, which utilised the same aircraft for the training of pilot instructors. The initial two SF-260 aircraft were delivered to Singapore on 6 September 1971 and conducted their inaugural flight at Sembawang Air Base.

In 1983, the airbase transitioned into a fully operational rotary-wing installation with the permanent relocation of the first resident helicopter squadron, 120 Squadron, from Changi Air Base.

In the late 1990s, the expansion of Sembawang Airbase involved the acquisition of sections of Lorong Gambas and Lorong Lada Merah for the purpose of redevelopment activities.

== Organisation ==
Currently, there are approximately 100 helicopters based in Sembawang Air Base, almost all are operating in support of the Singapore Army and the Republic of Singapore Navy. It is the home base to all the RSAF helicopter squadrons, consisting of Eurocopter AS332 Super Pumas, Boeing CH-47SD Chinooks, Sikorsky S-70B (derivative of Sikorsky SH-60 Seahawk) naval helicopters, as well as the Eurocopter Fennecs and Bell UH-1Hs, which are currently stored in reserve. Recently added to the base are the Boeing AH-64D Longbow Apache attack helicopters.

Currently, the RSAF's Chong Pang Camp with its associated Air Defence assets, is also located within the compound of the air base. The famous local Sembawang Hot Spring Park is no longer part of the camp enclosure and is now open to public.

== Based units ==
Flying and notable non-flying units based at Sembawang Air Base.

=== Republic of Singapore Air Force ===
The Flying squadrons are:

- 120 Squadron with 19 AH-64D Longbow Apaches;
- 123 Squadron with 6 S-70B Seahawks, these are owned and operated by the Republic of Singapore navy but flown by RSAF pilots;
- 124 Squadron with 5 EC120 Colibri, headquartered at SBAB with a training detachment at Seletar Airport;
- 125 Squadron with 22 AS332M Super Puma & Airbus H225, four of these are configured for Search and rescue duties;
- 126 Squadron with CH-47D;
- 127 Squadron with 6 CH-47D and 12 CH-47SD Chinooks.

The Support Squadrons are:

- Control Squadron – 206 SQN
- Airbase Civil Engineering Squadron – 506 SQN
- Force Protection Squadron – 606 SQN
- Airbase Sustainment Squadron – 706 SQN
- Aircraft Operations Engineering Squadron – 806 SQN
- Aircraft Specialist Engineering Squadron – 816 SQN

== Photo gallery ==
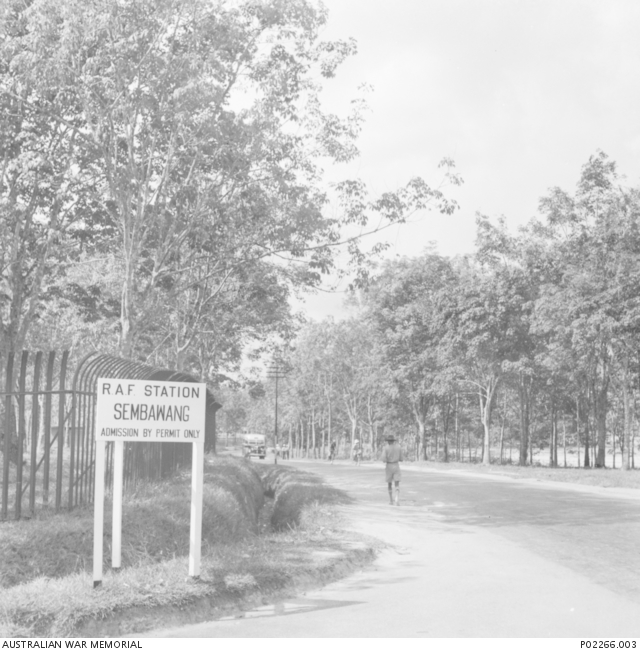
Entrance of RAF Sembawang, c. 1941.

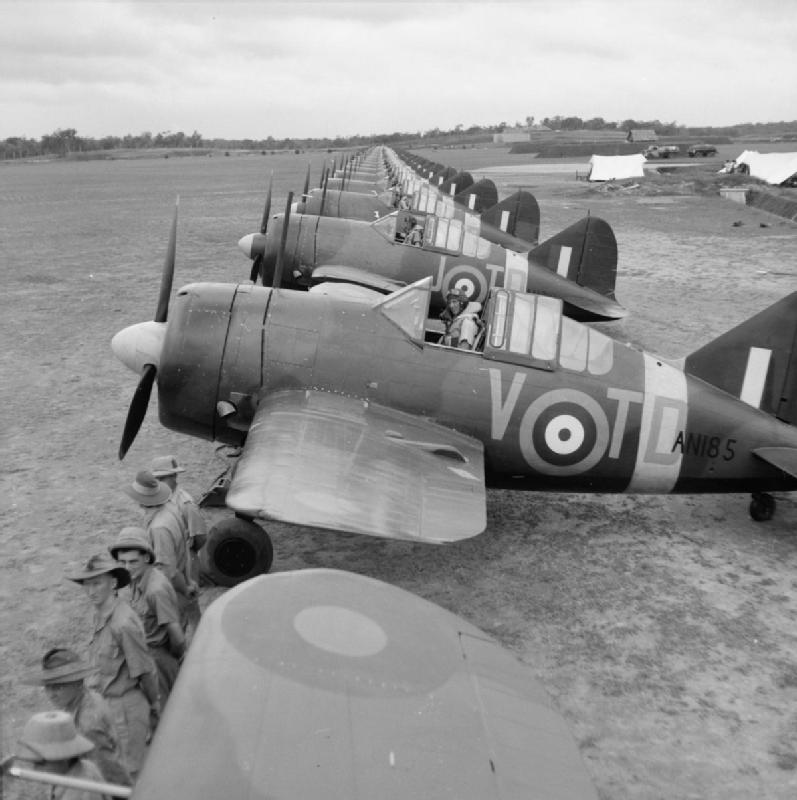
Brewster Buffalo fighters of No. 453 Squadron RAAF, November 1941.

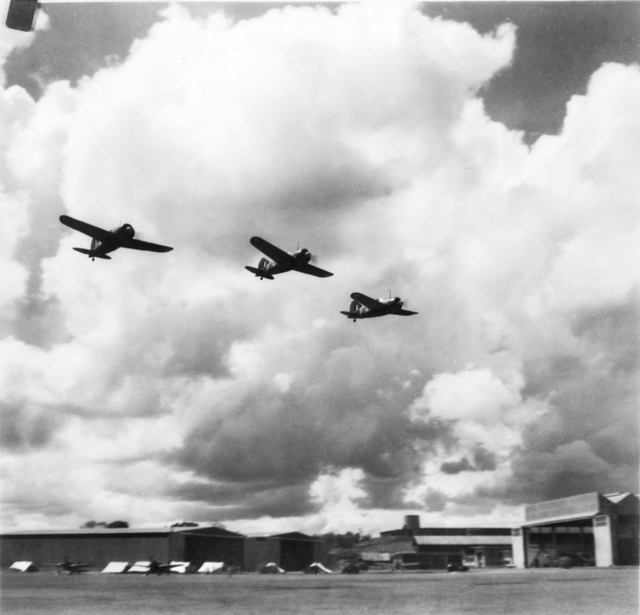
Brewster Buffalo aircraft of No. 21 Squadron flying over RAF Sembawang.

The staff and personnel from Sembawang Air Base Air Logistic Squadron posing in front of the helicopters currently in RSAF service.

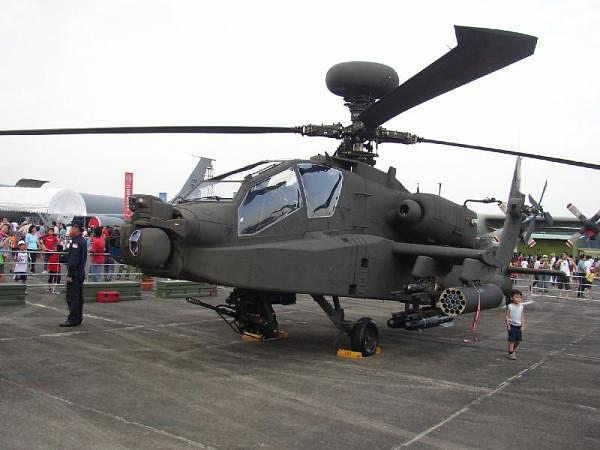
120 Squadron AH-64D Longbow Apache on static display during RSAF Open house.

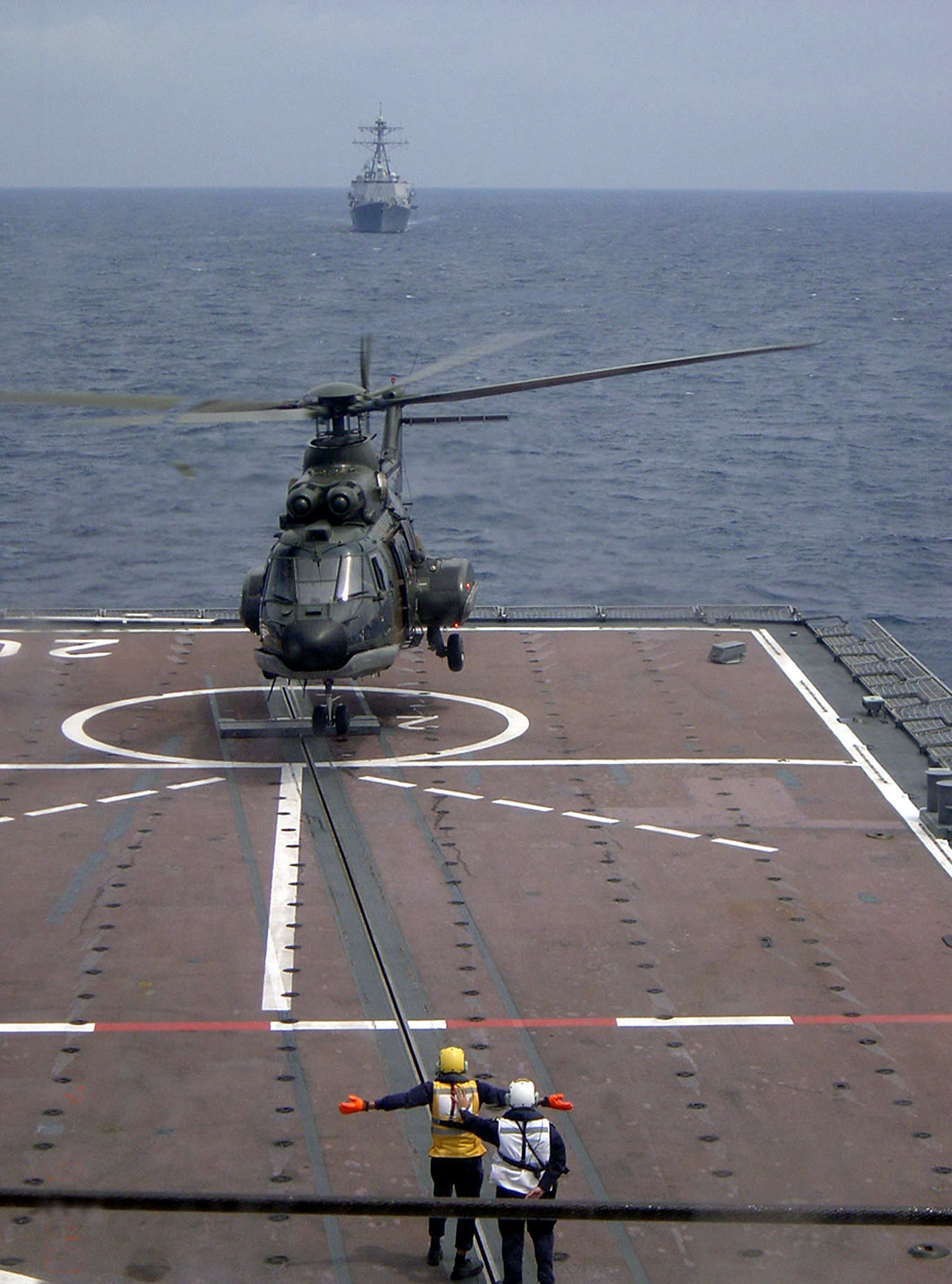
125 Squadron Super Puma takes off from the flight deck of the RSS Resolution – an Endurance-class LST. Visible in the foreground is the Aircraft Ship Integrated Secure and Traverse (ASIST) system.

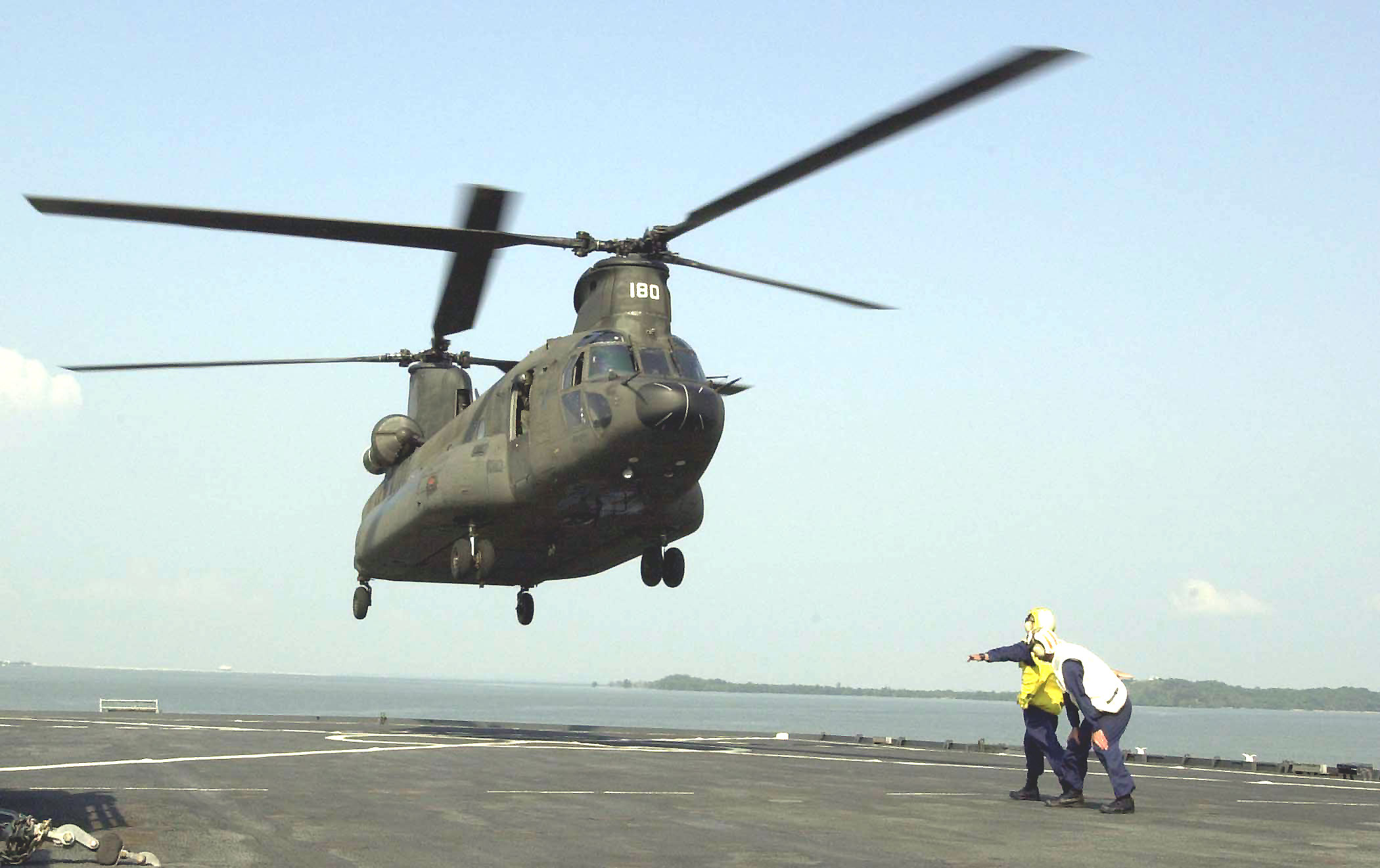
127 Squadron CH-47SD lands aboard USS Rushmore during Exercise CARAT 2001.

== Previous units and aircraft ==
List of past flying units and major non-flying units permanently based at Sembawang.

1941–42

- No. 62 Squadron RAF (detachment) – Bristol Blenheim I.
- No. 21 Squadron, Royal Australian Air Force (RAAF) – Brewster Buffalo
- No. 453 Squadron RAAF – Brewster Buffalo I.

1945–1971
Royal Air Force

- No. 28 Squadron RAF – Supermarine Spitfire FR.18.
- No. 60 Squadron RAF – Spitfire F.18.
- No. 194 Squadron RAF reformed here during February 1953 from the Far East Casevac Flight – Westland Dragonfly HC.2.
- No. 656 Squadron RAF reformed here on 29 June 1948 from No. 1914 Flight RAF – Auster AOP.5.

Royal Navy

- Aircraft Holding Unit Sembawang.
- Naval Aircraft Support Unit Sembawang.
- 791 Naval Air Squadron
- 800 Naval Air Squadron
- 802 Naval Air Squadron
- 804 Naval Air Squadron
- 806 Naval Air Squadron
- 807 Naval Air Squadron
- 811 Naval Air Squadron
- 812 Naval Air Squadron
- 814 Naval Air Squadron
- 815 Naval Air Squadron
- 816 Naval Air Squadron
- 817 Naval Air Squadron
- 820 Naval Air Squadron
- 824 Naval Air Squadron
- 825 Naval Air Squadron
- 826 Naval Air Squadron
- 827 Naval Air Squadron
- 837 Naval Air Squadron
- 845 Naval Air Squadron
- 846 Naval Air Squadron
- 847 Naval Air Squadron
- 848 Naval Air Squadron
- 849A Naval Air Squadron
- 888 Naval Air Squadron
- 1700 Naval Air Squadron
- 3 Commando Brigade Air Squadron

== See also ==
- Battle of Singapore
- British Far East Command
- Far East Air Force (Royal Air Force)
- Far East Strategic Reserve
- Indonesia–Malaysia confrontation
- Former overseas RAF bases
- Malayan Emergency
- Republic of Singapore Air Force
- Singapore strategy
