= 888 Naval Air Squadron =

Inactive flying squadron of the Royal Navy's Fleet Air Arm

- Squadron badge
- Active: 1941–1943; 1944–1946
- Disbanded: August 1946
- Country: United Kingdom
- Branch: Royal Navy
- Type: Single-seat fighter squadron
- Role: Fleet fighter squadron
- Size: six/twelve aircraft
- Part of: Fleet Air Arm
- Home station: See Naval air stations section for full list.
- Mottos: Nullo missio (Latin for 'no respite') (June 1942); Sine missione (Latin for 'Without quarter') (October 1942)
- Engagements: World War II: Operation Torch; Operation Husky; Operation Avalanche
- Battle honours: North Africa 1942-43; Sicily 1943; Salerno 1943; East Indies 1945

Insignia
- Squadron Badge Description: Blue, over water barry wavy of four white and blue a dove volant white (June 1942); Blue, over water barry wavy of four white and blue a martlet rising white (October 1942); Squadron aircrew felt the dove was insufficiently warlike, so submitted an alternative version a few months later.
- Identification Markings: single letters (Martlet); 07A+ (on Formidable for Operation Torch October 1942); 7A+ (later); no markings (Hellcat)

Aircraft flown
- Fighter: Grumman Martlet; Grumman Hellcat

888 Naval Air Squadron (888 NAS) was a Fleet Air Arm (FAA) naval air squadron of the United Kingdom's Royal Navy (RN). It was first established as a Fleet fighter unit at HMS Daedalus, RNAS Lee-on-Solent, in November 1941. The squadron boarded HMS Formidable in February 1942, heading to the Indian Ocean for the Madagascar invasion. It returned to HMS Merlin, RNAS Donibristle in September and the next month re-embarked for the North African landings, where it shot down two enemy aircraft. Throughout most of 1943, the squadron operated in the Mediterranean, supporting landings in Sicily and Salerno. The squadron was disbanded at HMS Heron, RNAS Yeovilton in November 1943.

It was reformed at HMS Ringtail, RNAS Burscough in June 1944. In September, the squadron joined HMS Rajah for Ceylon, operating as a PR unit from land. It joined HMS Indefatigable in December and began PR missions over Sumatra, moving to HMS Empress in February for PR missions over the Kra Isthmus, Penang, Phuket, and Sumatra. From then until the war's end, the squadron continued similar operations from other escort carriers and using mainly HMS Berhunda, RNAS Colombo Racecourse, as a base. After the war, the squadron focused on aerial surveys and returned to the United Kingdom to disband in August 1946.

== History ==
=== Fleet fighter squadron (1941–1943) ===
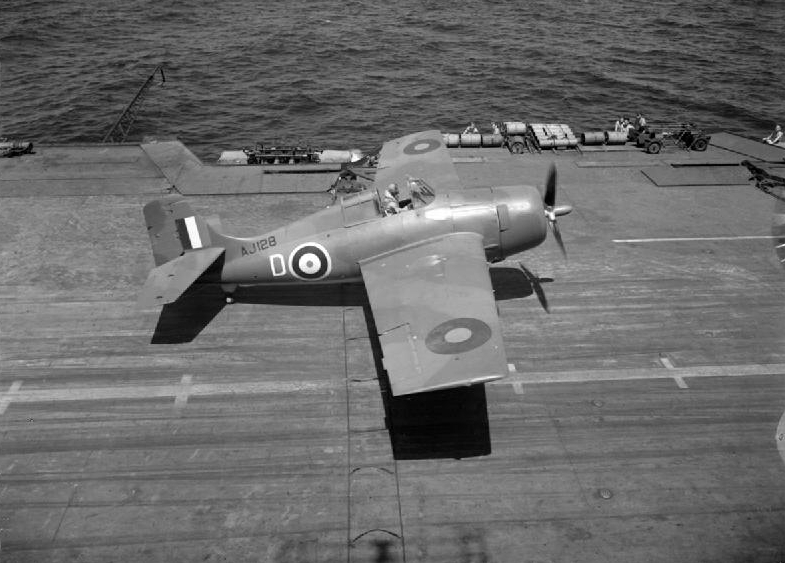
Grumman Martlet Mk II of 888 Naval Air Squadron on HMS Formidable in 1942

888 Naval Air Squadron, a fleet fighter unit, was established at RNAS Lee-on-Solent (HMS Daedalus), Hampshire, on 1 November 1941. Initially equipped with six Grumman Martlet Mk I, an American carrier-borne fighter aircraft, the squadron transitioned to a fleet of twelve Grumman Martlet Mk II fighter aircraft before the conclusion of the year.

The Grumman Martlet served as the British counterpart to the United States Navy and United States Marine Corps F4F-3, commonly referred to in the United States as the Grumman Wildcat. It was procured for the Fleet Air Arm concurrently with its acceptance into service by US forces. The manufacturers designated it as the G-36. The Mk I was powered by one 1,240 hp Wright Cyclone G-205A, whereas the Mk II used one 1,200 hp Pratt & Whitney Twin Wasp S3C4-G.

On February 4, 1942, the squadron departed from RNAS Machrihanish (HMS Landrail), Argyll and Bute, Scotland, and embarked in the Illustrious-class aircraft carrier, HMS Formidable, proceeding to the Indian Ocean in preparation for the invasion of Madagascar. During this operation, various detachments were deployed ashore, primarily to the RN Air Section at Royal Air Force Port Reitz, Mombasa, Kenya, East Africa. Subsequently, conducting reconnaissance of the peripheral islands to assess the potential presence of Japanese military forces.

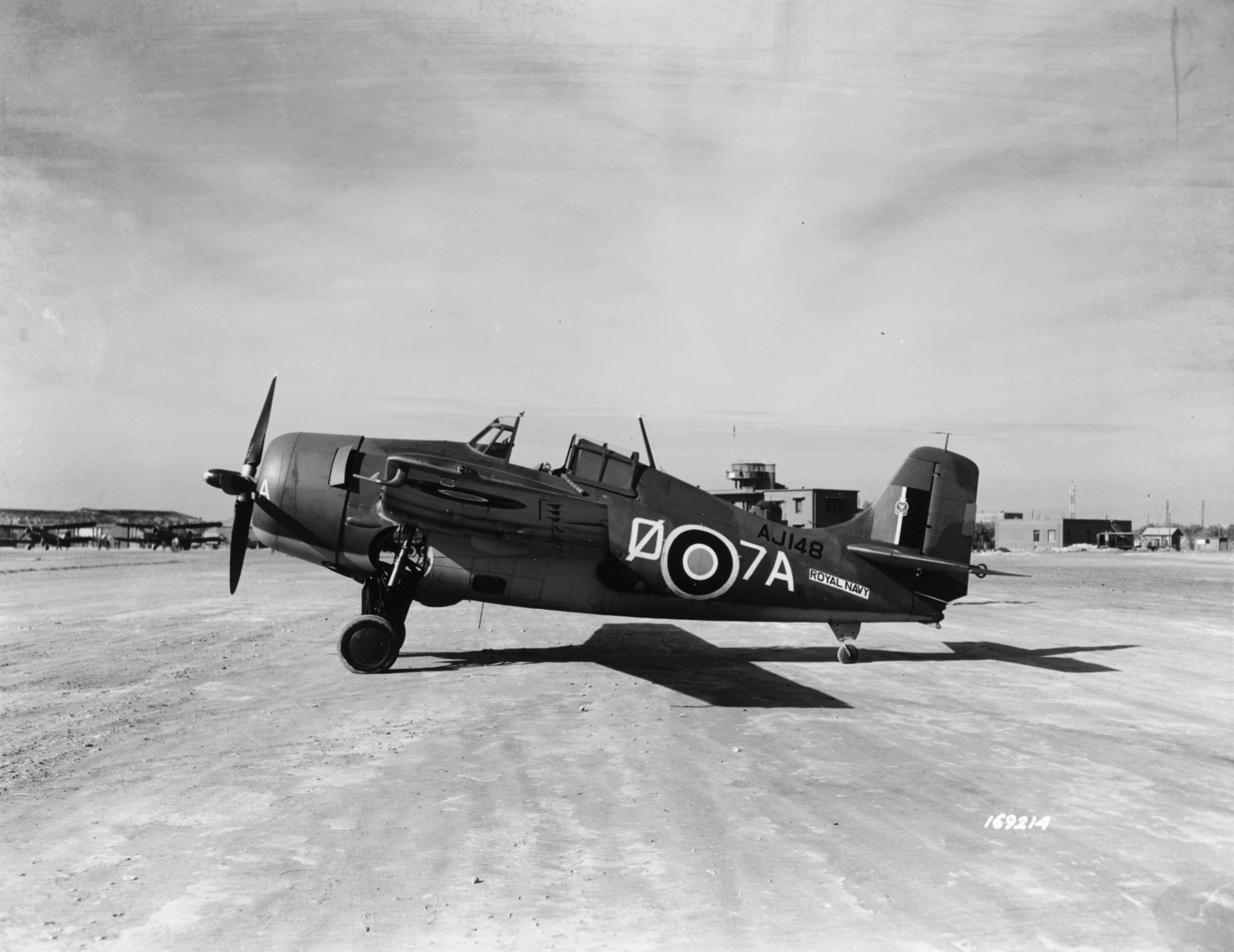
Grumman Martlet Mk II of 888 NAS, Oran, Dec. 1942

Upon returning to RNAS Donibristle (HMS Merlin), Fife, Scotland, on 21 September, the squadron received Grumman Martlet Mk IV fighter aircraft in the subsequent month. On 20 October, the squadron re-deployed for the North African landings, Operation Torch, during which it successfully engaged and accounted for two enemy aircraft.

The majority of the subsequent year was dedicated to operations in the Mediterranean region, which encompassed support for the landings in Sicily during July, Operation Husky, and the landings at Salerno in September, Operation Avalanche. Following these engagements, the squadron returned to the United Kingdom. In November 1943, the squadron was officially disbanded at RNAS Yeovilton (HMS Heron), Somerset, England, marking the conclusion of its activities after a year characterised by significant military involvement in the Mediterranean.

A selection of pilots of 888 Naval Air Squadron
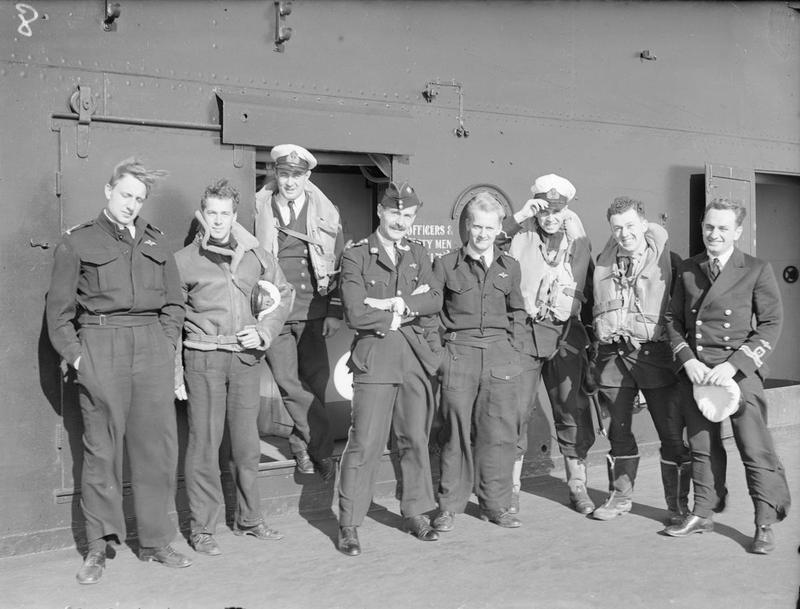
Pilots of 888 Fighter Squadron on Board HMS Formidable in the Mediterranean, December 1942. L to R : Sub Lieut (A) A R Astin, RNVR, Sub Lieut (A) R Phillips, RNVR, Lieutenant (A) D M Jeram, RN, Captain F G Bird, RM (Commanding the Squadron), Sub Lieut (A) E J Clark, RNVR, Sub Lieut (A) E Stilliard, RNVR, Lieutenant (A) P G Burke, RNVR.

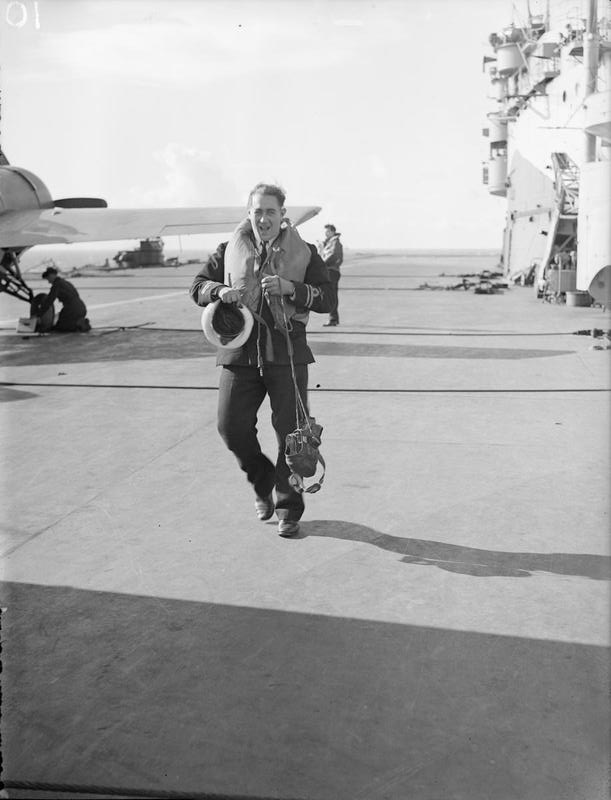
Lieut (A) D M Jeram, RN, Grumman Martlet fighter pilot 888 Squadron, who shot down two French aircraft in the initial North African Offensive, walking to his aircraft.

=== Single-seat fighter squadron (1944–1946) ===
888 Naval Air Squadron was re-established at RNAS Burscough (HMS Ringtail), Lancashire, England, on 10 June 1944, equipped with six Grumman Hellcat FR. Mk. II fighter aircraft, this particular variant was fitted with camera equipment.

The Grumman Hellcat F. Mk. II was the British equivalent of the United States Navy's F6F-5 variant fitted with one 2,250 hp Pratt & Whitney Double Wasp R-2800-10W engine.

In September, the squadron was conveyed to Ceylon aboard the Ruler-class escort carrier, HMS Rajah. Subsequently, 888 Naval Air Squadron engaged in training sorties focused on photographic reconnaissance, and by the year's conclusion, it was embarked in the Implacable-class aircraft carrier, HMS Indefatigable, to conduct operations over Sumatra in early 1945.

Remaining stationed in Ceylon, the squadron was present when the British Pacific Fleet departed for Australia. Subsequently, in February, it transitioned to the escort carrier, HMS Empress, undertaking photographic reconnaissance sorties across Kra Isthmus, Penang, Phuket Island, and northern Sumatra, operating at elevations between 30,000 feet (9,100 m) and 42,000 feet (13,000 m). A total of twenty-two reconnaissance missions were conducted from 22 February to 7 March.

During this period leading up to the conclusion of the war, the squadron undertook comparable responsibilities while operating from various escort carriers, such as HMS Khedive, HMS Emperor, HMS Shah, and HMS Ameer. Additionally, the squadron had another assignment aboard HMS Empress, utilising airfields in Ceylon, predominantly RNAS Colombo Racecourse (HMS Berhunda), as its shore station.

Following Victory over Japan Day, the squadron journeyed to Singapore, maintaining its primary function by engaging in aerial survey operations under the jurisdiction of Air Command, South East Asia of the Royal Air Force (RAF). The unit returned home in June 1946 and was officially disbanded upon its arrival in August.

== Aircraft operated ==
888 Naval Air Squadron operated a couple of different aircraft types and variants:

- Grumman Martlet Mk I fighter aircraft (November 1941 - January 1942)
- Grumman Martlet Mk II fighter aircraft (December 1941 - September 1943)
- Grumman Martlet Mk IV fighter aircraft (October 1942 - November 1943)
- Grumman Hellcat FR. Mk. II fighter aircraft (fitted with camera equipment) (June 1944 - June 1946)

== Battle honours ==
The battle honours awarded to 888 Naval Air Squadron are:

- North Africa 1942-43
- Sicily 1943
- Salerno 1943
- East Indies 1945

== Naval air stations and aircraft carriers ==
888 Naval Air Squadron operated from a number of naval air stations of the Royal Navy, and Royal Air Force stations in the UK and overseas, and also a number of Royal Navy fleet carriers and escort carriers and other airbases overseas, throughout its existence:

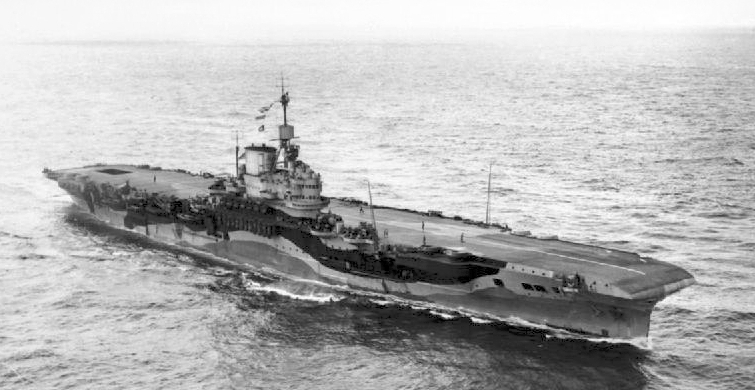
HMS Formidable, underway in 1942

1941–1943

- Royal Naval Air Station Lee-on-Solent (HMS Daedalus) (1 November - 29 December 1941)
  - Royal Naval Air Station Machrihanish (HMS Landrail) (Detachment three aircraft 15 December 1941 - 11 January 1942)
- Royal Naval Air Station St Merryn (HMS Vulture) (29 December 1941 – 12 January 1942)
- Royal Naval Air Station Lee-on-Solent (HMS Daedalus) (12 - 25 January 1942)
- Royal Naval Air Station Machrihanish (HMS Landrail) (25 January – 4 February 1942)
- HMS Formidable (4 February – 11 August 1942)
  - RN Air Section Wynberg (Detachment four aircraft 10 – 12 March 1942)
  - Royal Air Force China Bay (Detachment four aircraft 24–30 March 1942)
  - Royal Air Force Ratmalana (Detachment four aircraft 23–24 April 1942)
  - RN Air Section Port Reitz (Detachment 10–29 May 1942)
  - RN Air Section Port Reitz (Detachment four aircraft 1–15 July 1942)
  - Royal Air Force Ratmalana (Detachment four 28–30 July 1942)
- RN Air Section Port Reitz (11–24 August 1942)
- HMS Formidable (24 August – 21 September 1942)
- Royal Naval Air Station Donibristle (HMS Merlin) (21 September – 8 October 1942)
- Royal Naval Air Station Hatston (HMS Sparrowhawk) (8–20 October 1942)
- HMS Formidable (20 October 1942 - 13 January 1943)
  - RN Air Section Gibraltar (Detachment 6–10 December 1942)
  - La Senia Airfield (Detachment four aircraft 11–24 December 1942)
  - RN Air Section Gibraltar (Detachment 5–12 January 1943)
- La Senia Airfield (13 January – 7 February 1943)
- HMS Formidable (7–8 February 1943)
- RN Air Section Gibraltar (8 February – 11 March 1943)
- HMS Formidable (11 March – 6 June 1943)
  - RN Air Section Tafaraoui (Detachment three aircraft 12–25 March 1943)
  - RN Air Section Gibraltar (Detachment two aircraft 26 March – 4 April 1943)
  - RN Air Section Tafaraoui (Detachment 8–14 April 1943)
  - RN Air Section Gibraltar (Detachment 15–19 April 1943/20–29 April 1943)
  - RN Air Section Tafaraoui (Detachment 30 April - 3 May 1943)
  - RN Air Section Gibraltar (Detachment three aircraft 7–28 May 1943)
- RN Air Section Tafaraoui (6–14 June 1943)
- HMS Formidable (14 June – 22 August 1943)
  - RN Air Section Gibraltar (Dt Black Flight 15–19 June 1943)
  - RN Air Section Ta Kali (Detachment eight aircraft 17 July – 21 August 1943)
- Royal Naval Air Station Dekheila (HMS Grebe) (22–28 August 1943)
- HMS Formidable (28 August - 12 September 1943)
  - HMS Unicorn (Detachment 11–13 September 1943)
- RN Air Section Ta Kali (12–20 September 1943)
- HMS Formidable (20 September – 18 October 1943)
- Royal Naval Air Station Machrihanish (HMS Landrail) (18–31 October 1943)
- HMS Formidable (31 October - 10 November 1943)
  - Royal Naval Air Station Hatston (HMS Sparrowhawk) (Detachment four aircraft 8–12 November 1943)
- Royal Naval Air Station Machrihanish (HMS Landrail) (10–14 November 1943)
- Royal Naval Air Station Yeovilton (HMS Heron) (14–16 November 1943)
- disbanded - (16 November 1943)

1944–1946

- Royal Naval Air Station Burscough (HMS Ringtail) (10 June – 7 September 1944)
- Royal Naval Aircraft Repair Yard Belfast (HMS Gadwall) (7–9 September 1944)
- HMS Rajah (9 September – 11 October 1944)
- RN Air Section China Bay (11–19 October 1944)
- RN Air Section Cochin (19–23 October 1944)
- Royal Naval Air Station Colombo Racecourse (HMS Berhunda) (23 October – 24 December 1944)
- HMS Indefatigable (24 December 1944 – 7 January 1945)
- Royal Naval Air Station Colombo Racecourse (HMS Berhunda) (7 January – 7 February 1945)
- HMS Empress (7 February - 6 March 1945)
- Royal Naval Air Station Colombo Racecourse (HMS Berhunda) (6 March – 1 April 1945)
- HMS Khedive (1–5 April 1945)
- Royal Naval Air Station Colombo Racecourse (HMS Berhunda) (5–8 April 1945)
- HMS Emperor (8–20 April 1945)
- Royal Naval Air Station Colombo Racecourse (HMS Berhunda) (20–25 April 1945)
- HMS Shah (25 April – 9 May 1945)
- Royal Naval Air Station Colombo Racecourse (HMS Berhunda) (9–31 May 1945)
- HMS Empress (31 May – 4 June 1945)
- Royal Naval Air Station Colombo Racecourse (HMS Berhunda) (4–13 June 1945)
- HMS Ameer (13–25 June 1945)
- Royal Naval Air Station Colombo Racecourse (HMS Berhunda) (25 June – 7 September 1945)
- Royal Naval Air Station Katukurunda (HMS Ukussa) (7 September – 16 December 1945)
- HMS Smiter (16–27 December 1945)
- Royal Naval Air Station Sembawang (HMS Simbang) (27 December 1945 – 29 June 1946)
- passage to UK (29 June – August 1946)
- disbanded, August 1946

== Commanding officers ==
List of commanding officers of 888 Naval Air Squadron, with date of appointment:

1941 - 1943

- Captain F.D.G. Bird, RM, from 1 November 1941
- Lieutenant Commander B.A. MacCaw, DSC, RNVR, from 16 January 1943
- Major F.D.G. Bird, RM, from 15 April 1943
- Lieutenant M. Hordern, RN, from 22 October 1943
- disbanded - 16 November 1943

1944 - 1946

- Lieutenant Commander(A) L. Mann, RNVR, from 10 June 1944
- Lieutenant Commander B.A. MacCaw, DSC, RNVR, from 20 March 1945
- Lieutenant Commander(A) J.A. Young, RNVR, from 28 October 1945
- none, from 29 June 1946
- disbanded - August 1946

Note: Abbreviation (A) signifies Air Branch of the RN or RNVR.
