= RNAS Culdrose =

Royal Naval Air Station in Cornwall, England

Royal Naval Air Station Culdrose
- Near Helston, Cornwall in England
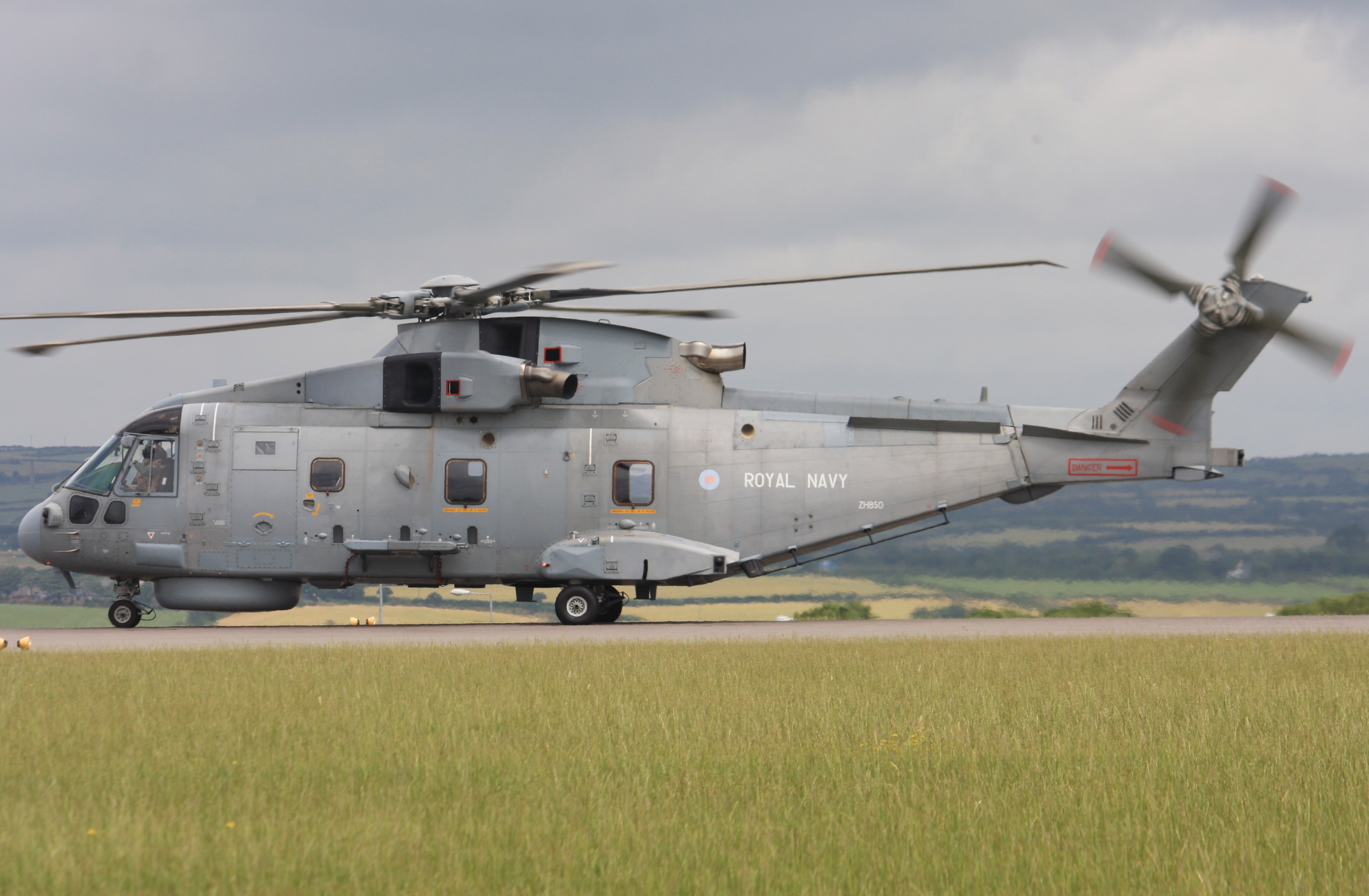
- An AgustaWestland Merlin HM2 at RNAS Culdrose

Site information
- Type: Royal Naval Air Station
- Owner: Government of the United Kingdom, Ministry of Defence
- Operator: Royal Navy
- Controlled by: Fleet Air Arm
- Open to the public: no
- Condition: operational
- Website: Official website

Location
- Location in Cornwall RNAS Culdrose (the United Kingdom)
- Coordinates: 50°05′10″N 05°15′21″W
- Area: 623 hectares (1,540 acres)

Site history
- Built: 1947; 79 years ago
- Built by: John Laing & Son
- In use: 1947 – present

Garrison information
- Current commander: Captain James Hall
- Occupants: Flying units: 750 Naval Air Squadron; 814 Naval Air Squadron; 820 Naval Air Squadron; 824 Naval Air Squadron; See Units section for full list

Airfield information
- Identifiers: ICAO: EGDR, WMO: 038090
- Elevation: 81.6 metres (268 ft) AMSL
Runways
Direction	Length and surface
11/29	1,829 metres (6,001 ft) asphalt
18/36	1,055 metres (3,461 ft) asphalt
06/24	1,045 metres (3,428 ft) asphalt
- Source: UK Military Aeronautical Information Publication

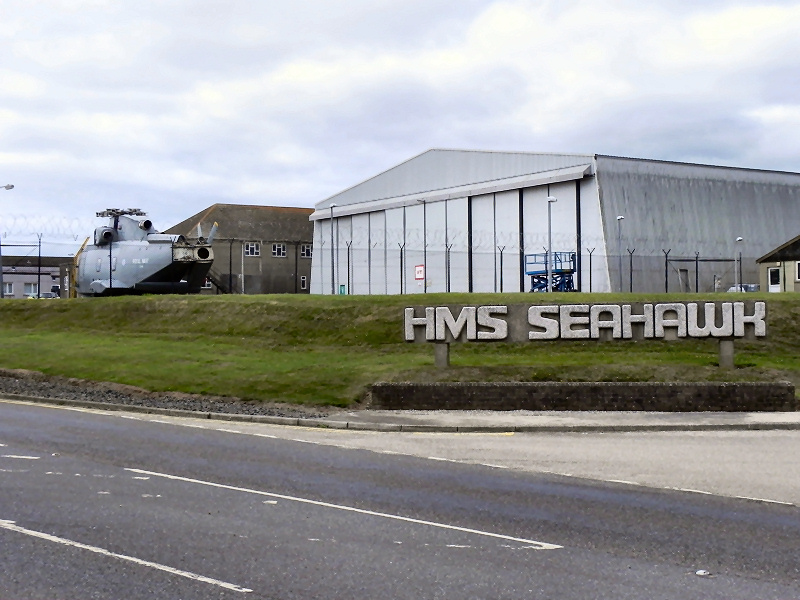
The entrance to RNAS Culdrose (also known as HMS Seahawk) during 2015.

Royal Naval Air Station Culdrose, commonly referred to as RNAS Culdrose, (commissioned HMS Seahawk); ICAO: EGDR) is a Royal Navy airbase located beside the town of Helston, situated on the Lizard Peninsula in southern Cornwall, England, United Kingdom.

The airbase is one of the largest helicopter bases in Europe. This location serves as the primary operational centre for the Merlin Helicopter Force, which constitutes the Royal Navy's fleet dedicated to anti-submarine warfare, and is composed of two Fleet Air Arm front-line AgustaWestland Merlin HMA2 helicopter squadrons: 814 Naval Air Squadron and 820 Naval Air Squadron. The former is typically associated with a Royal Navy frigate specialised in anti-submarine warfare, while the latter refers to the airborne unit tasked with safeguarding the carrier strike groups of HMS Queen Elizabeth (R08) and HMS Prince of Wales (R09). Additionally, the airbase hosts 700X Naval Air Squadron, recognised as the Royal Navy's specialist unit for drone operations.

The airbase also serves as an important training centre for the Fleet Air Arm. New Merlin HMA2 aircrew and engineers receive training at 824 Naval Air Squadron, before they move on to one of the front-line squadrons of the Merlin Helicopter Force. It also serves as the base for 750 Naval Air Squadron, which is responsible for training Royal Navy Observers and Royal Air Force Weapon Systems Officers (WSOs). There is also a number of non-flying units at RNAS Culdrose, including 1700 Naval Air Squadron which delivers engineering, aviation, and logistical assistance for operations and exercises globally, both at sea and on land. The airbase is equipped with a substantial Air Engineering Training School, which includes a dedicated Survival Equipment Section. Additionally, it houses the Royal Naval School of Flight Deck Operations, the institution responsible for training all personnel involved in aircraft handling aboard aircraft carriers.

== History ==
=== 1940–1999 ===
Admiralty surveyors first started preliminary surveys of land near Helston in 1942. RNAS Culdrose was built by John Laing & Son and commissioned as HMS Seahawk five years after these initial surveys. The station was originally designed to be a wartime airfield lasting about ten years.

The initial plans were for Culdrose to serve as a Naval Fighting School, it soon developed other roles. These varied roles included such things as the trials of the Navy's first jets, training of airborne early warning crews, and as a home base for carrier-based aircraft. Over the years the station's emphasis changed from fixed wing aircraft to rotary wing, although its main role remains largely the same.

In 1958, HMS Seahawk was given the Freedom of the Borough of Helston, a parade thanking the town was set up in 1958, and is still happening; on 20 September 2018, the parade celebrated its 60th anniversary.

From 1968 it was one of the designated locations for plan PYTHON, the plan for continuity of government in the event of nuclear war.

=== 2000 onwards ===
On 18 May 2012, British Airways flight BAW2012 carrying the Olympic Flame, from Athens International Airport, landed at RNAS Culdrose. The aircraft, an Airbus A319 painted yellow and named 'The Firefly', carried dignitaries including Seb Coe, Princess Anne, and David Beckham. The following day, the Olympic Flame started its first leg from Land's End, through Cornwall, to Plymouth. Its final destination was the Olympic Stadium in time for the start of the 2012 Summer Olympics.

The airbase puts £100 million into the Cornish economy, and is one of the largest single-site employers in Cornwall.

== Units ==
Flying and notable non-flying units based at RNAS Culdrose.

=== Royal Navy ===
Fleet Air Arm

- 700X Naval Air Squadron – ScanEagle RM1 and RQ-20 Puma
- 750 Naval Air Squadron – Avenger T1
- 814 Naval Air Squadron – Merlin HM2
- 820 Naval Air Squadron – Merlin HM2
- 824 Naval Air Squadron – Merlin HM2
  - Merlin Training Facility
- 1700 Naval Air Squadron
- Engineering Training Section
- Merlin Depth Maintenance Facility
- Naval Flying Standards Flight (Rotary Wing)
- School of Flight Deck Operations
- HMS Seahawk Volunteer Band
- TS 771 NAS Royal Navy Cadet Forces (Helston SCC)

== Operations ==
=== Helicopter operations ===
==== Merlin ====
814 Naval Air Squadron and 820 Naval Air Squadron operate the AgustaWestland Merlin HM2, primarily in the carrier based anti-submarine warfare role. The Merlin is fitted with an advanced sensor suite of active / passive sonics, Orange Reaper Electronic Support Measures and Blue Kestrel radar, and provides a strong force in under-water warfare and anti-surface unit warfare. The unit's various roles include protecting the Royal Navy against surface and sub-surface threats, command and control, transport, evacuation, and Search and Rescue capabilities.

824 Naval Air Squadron is the Merlin Operational Conversion Unit (OCU), incorporating the Operational Evaluation Unit flight. The Merlin Training Facility (MTF) is part of 824 NAS, and is a first in that it encompasses pilot, observer, aircrewman, and engineering training under one roof. The facility comprises a Cockpit Dynamic Simulator (CDS), three Rear Crew Trainers (RCT), six Part Task Trainers (PTT), computer-based training (CBT) classrooms, a Mechanical Systems Trainer (MST), and a Weapon Systems Trainer (WST).

Merlin Depth Maintenance Facility

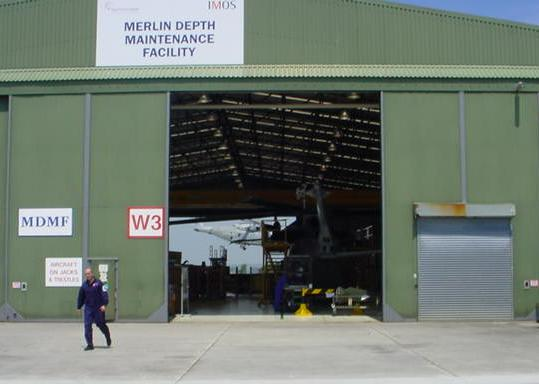
Hangar W3, home to the Merlin Depth Maintenance Flight.

The Merlin Depth Maintenance Facility (MDMF) performs depth maintenance on AW101 Merlin helicopters of the Royal Navy. MDMF is located at RNAS Culdrose, and is a partnership between the UK Ministry of Defence and Leonardo Helicopters.

For UK Merlin helicopters depth maintenance is centred on a four year cycle. MDMF has a crew-based maintenance philosophy, in which each aircraft is assigned a crew which oversee all activities from induction to output. Each Merlin has a bespoke package of calendar and hourly tasks, emergent repairs and modifications as detailed in a Statement of Work (SoW).

==== Naval Flying Standards Flight (Rotary Wing) ====
All rotary wing (helicopter) pilots, observers and aircrewmen are assessed bi-annually by NFSF(RW) examiners. This covers all helicopter squadrons at RNAS Yeovilton as well as Culdrose. The assessment consists of a ground exam and a check flight, and may also occur if a squadron has referred them to NFSF(RW).

==== Engineering Training Section ====
The Engineering Training Section (ETS) at RNAS Culdrose is a unit of the Air Engineering Department that is dedicated to the instruction of Merlin Mk2, Mk3 and generic air engineering training. The primary task of the ETS is to train sufficient air engineering personnel to enable the front line to achieve operational capability. It comprises approximately 20 personnel including both service and civilian instructors and is headed by a lieutenant who is responsible to Commander of Air Engineering.

=== Observer training ===
750 Naval Air Squadron provides grading and Basic Observer Training for the Fleet Air Arm's observers and operates the Beechcraft Avenger T1.

=== Uncrewed aerial vehicle operations ===
700X Naval Air Squadron is the Royal Navy's first squadron of uncrewed aerial vehicles (UAV) using ScanEagle aircraft. In 2014, 700X Naval Air Squadron was one of the smallest naval units with twelve personnel but numbers could double the following year.

=== Other units ===
==== 1700 Naval Air Squadron ====
1700 Naval Air Squadron provides qualified specialist personnel to man, operate and maintain all Royal Naval controlled systems in all aviation capable platforms in both the Royal Navy and the Royal Fleet Auxiliary. The unit provides tailored teams, ranging in size and specialisms and can comprise aircraft handlers, aircraft controllers, fire-fighters, military police officers, logistical personnel, engineers, medics and other specialists to allow the continued operation and protection of naval aircraft worldwide. Established in December 2007, the unit was previously known as the Maritime Aviation Support Force (MASF). It was renamed 1700 Naval Air Squadron on 31 October 2017.

Motto: Auxilio Ad Alta (Reaching The Heights With Help)

==== School of Flight Deck Operations ====
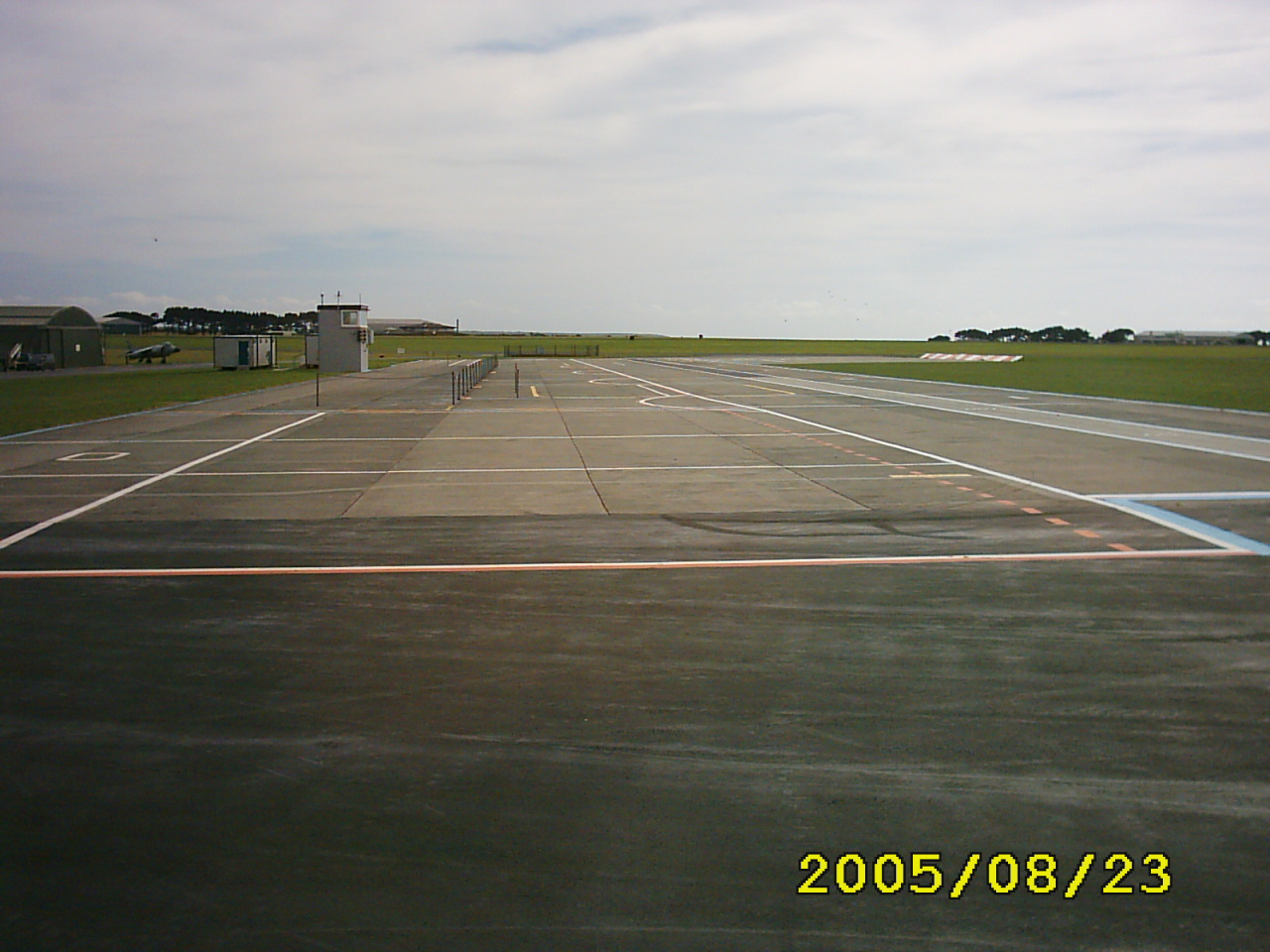
A dummy deck laid out to practice aircraft handling and manoeuvring in a confined space.

The Royal Naval School of Flight Deck Operations provides professional training for all naval aircraft handlers. The school also trains other Navy personnel and personnel from the RAF and Army who will be involved in operating aircraft at sea.

Trainees are trained in activities they will be required to carry out during their career, such as tackling aircraft fires and aircraft deck handling. Equipment used includes; mock-up can be produced and adjusted at the instructors control and the 'Dummy Deck', a full-sized replica of an Invincible-class aircraft carrier's deck, allowing trainees to practice their roles in realistic environments, experiencing training with live aircraft with reduced risk and danger compared to operating on a real aircraft carrier.

Motto: Nostris in Manibus Tuti (Safe in our Hands)

==== Predannack Airfield ====
RNAS Culdrose has a satellite airfield at Predannack which it uses primarily as a relief landing ground and night flying for helicopter pilot training; it also houses a small arms range and aircraft fire fighting facilities.

700X Naval Air Squadron, which is tasked with the advancement of unmanned aerial vehicle (UAV) technology within the Royal Navy, conducts its training and testing operations at Predannack Airfield, despite being officially headquartered at RNAS Culdrose.

==== HMS Seahawk Volunteer Band ====
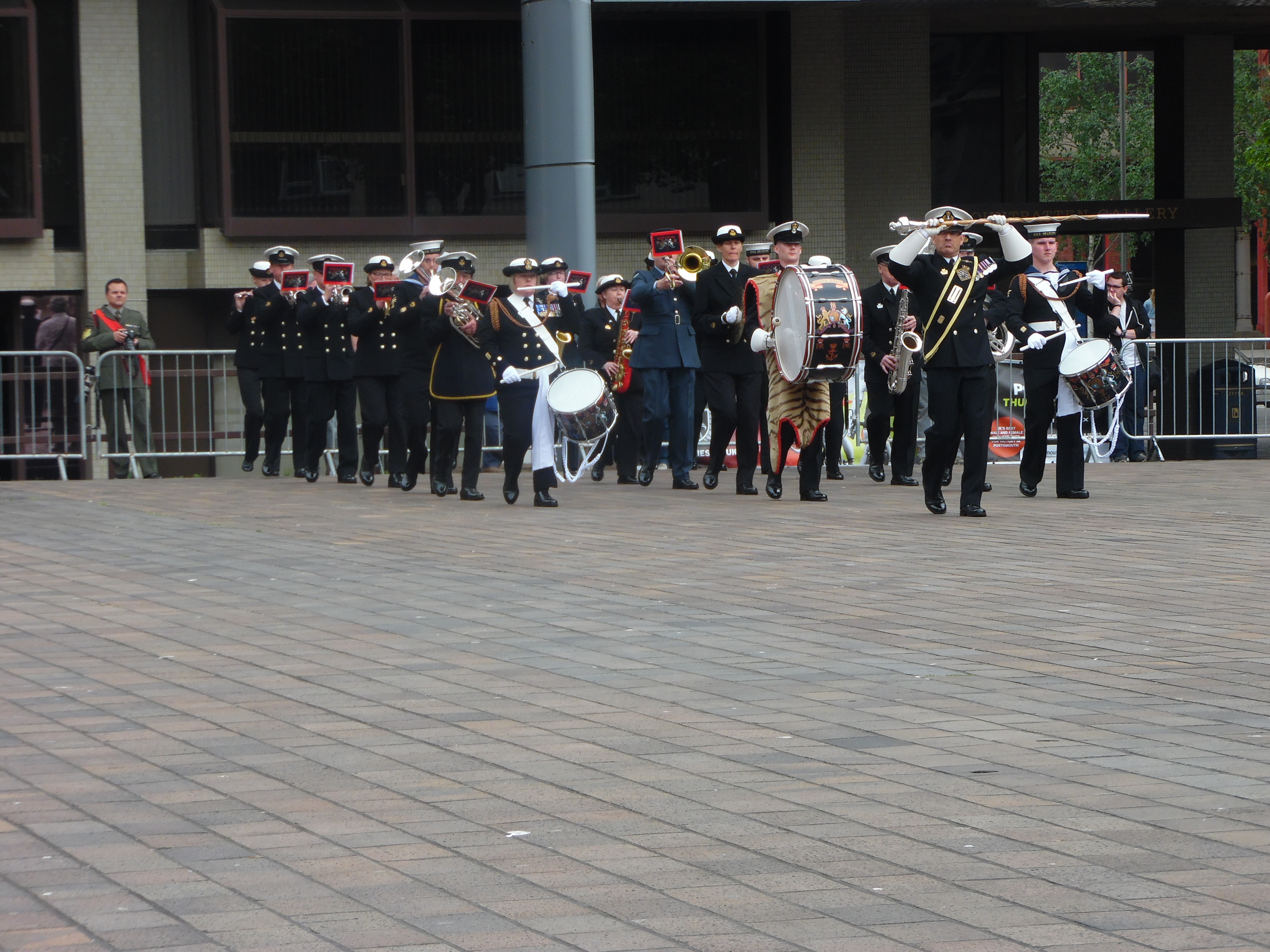
HMS Seahawk Volunteer Band at the 2016 Royal Navy Volunteer Band Association Festival in Portsmouth

The HMS Seahawk Volunteer Band is one of the nine volunteer bands under the Royal Marines Band Service. It performs regularly around Culdrose and Helston, performing a mainly Ceremonial role on events such as the Freedom of Helston Parade. Although mainly a wind band as well as a marching band, it also includes jazz ensembles and a corps of drums.

In July 2003, the band was awarded the Bambara Trophy, the recipient of which is considered to be the best band in the Fleet Air Arm. On 7 June 2016 the band performed a dawn fanfare on the King Harry Ferry to honour the official birthday of Queen Elizabeth II.

The list of bandmasters are as follows:

- Colour Sergeant Rich Fenwick (?–2004)
- Colour Sergeant Paul Nolan (May 2004–2014)
- Colour Sergeant Dom O’Connor (2014–Present)

== Former Squadrons based at RNAS Culdrose ==
700 Naval Air Squadron
The squadron was disbanded on 31 March 2008. With two Merlin helicopters, Squadron 700M carried out trial modifications and developed tactics and operational procedure. The Motto was : "Experienta Docet" – "Experience Teaches"

Fleet Requirements Air Direction Unit (FRADU)

FRADU was operated by the contractor Serco Defence and Aerospace as part of the RN MAC 2004, using 13 BAE Hawk T1 advanced jet trainer aircraft on lease to the Royal Navy from the RAF and based at RNAS Culdrose. Two of these aircraft were permanently detached to Naval Flying Standards Flight (Fixed Wing) at RNAS Yeovilton where they were flown by RN pilots, but maintained by Serco engineers.

With the draw-down of the Sea King force and the return of British forces from Afghanistan, 854 NAS & 857 NAS were merged back into 849 NAS in 2014.

771 Naval Air Squadron
771 was responsible for search and rescue in Cornwall, the Isles of Scilly and the western English Channel, in total an area of approximately 200 nmi (370 km; 230 mi). It also administered the Sea Kings on detachment at HMS Gannet. The squadron was stood down on 1 January 2016, decommissioned on 22 March 2016 and was responsible for saving over 15,000 lives on more than 9,000 missions.

Between October 2004 and March 2018, 829 Naval Air Squadron provided up to three ship's flights capable of deploying with Type 23 frigates. The squadron decommissioned on 28 March 2018, with the unit's aircraft and personnel becoming part of 814 Naval Air Squadron, creating the largest ever Merlin squadron.

849 Naval Air Squadron disbanded in April 2020. This previously provided the Royal Navy's airborne surveillance and control.

=== Airborne threat simulation ===
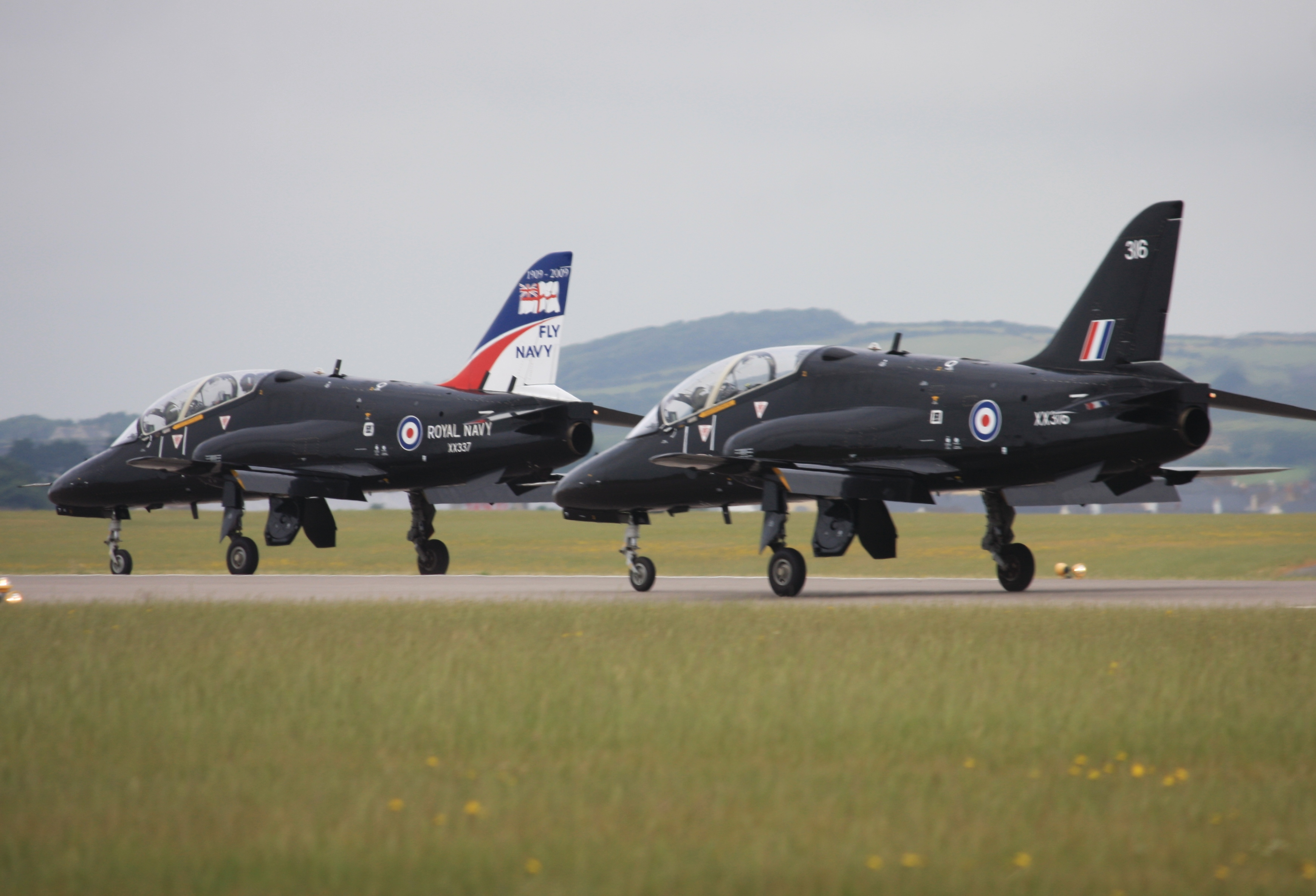
Two Hawk T1 at RNAS Culdrose in 2013

Hawk T1s of 736 Naval Air Squadron provided a maritime aggressor squadron for Royal Navy ships and vessels of other foreign navies, simulating missile attacks and fast jet attacks on warships in the naval exercise areas south and west of Plymouth. The unit was an evolution of the previous Fleet Requirements Aircraft Direction Unit (FRADU) and was supported by the defence contractor SERCO. 736 Sqn was decommissioned in Spring 2022, with the Hawk jets leaving Cornwall on Thursday 24th March 2022.

The squadron was decommissioned on 31 March 2022.

== See also ==
- List of air stations of the Royal Navy
- Torrey Canyon oil spill#Oil spill
