= List of Avro Anson operators =

This List of Avro Anson operators is a list of users who flew and operated the Avro Anson.

== Military operators ==
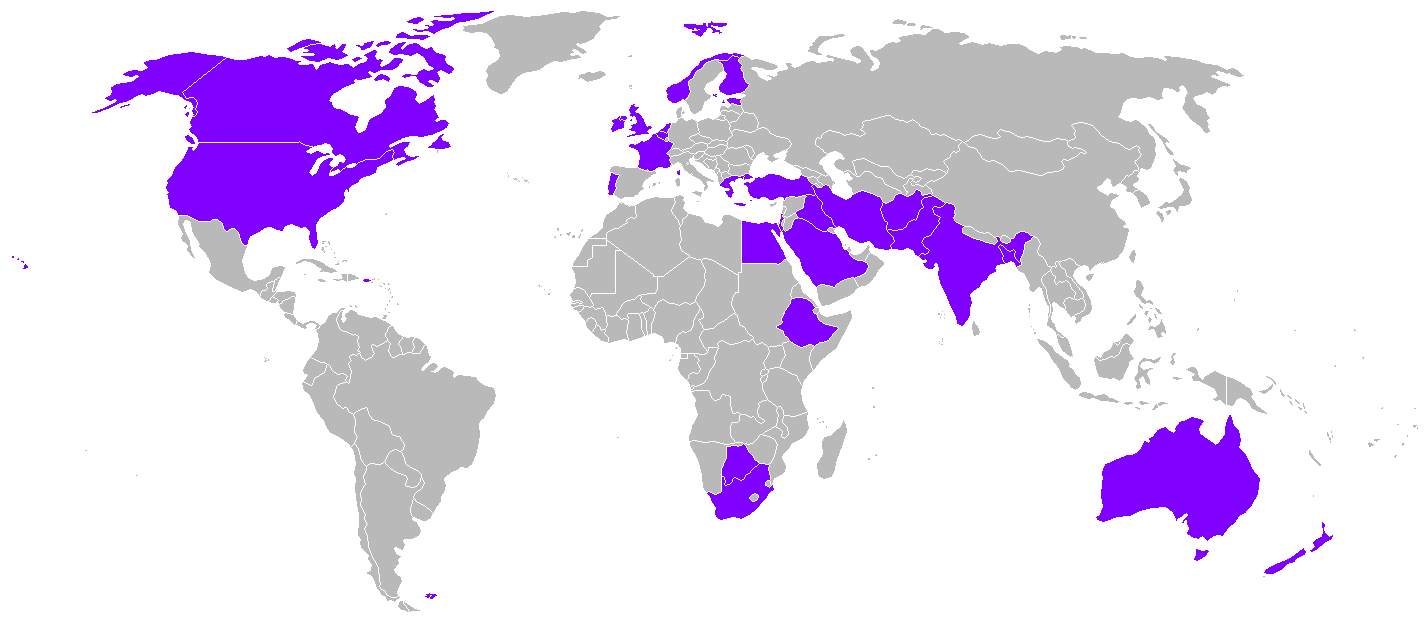
Military Anson operators

Afghanistan
Royal Afghan Air Force – 13 Anson 18 aircraft were delivered to the Royal Afghan Air Force from 1948 and retired by 1972
Australia
Royal Australian Air Force – 1,028 Ansons were operated by the Royal Australian Air Force, retired in 1955
Belgium
Belgian Air Force (15 x Anson I, 2 x Anson 12s operated from 1946 to 1954)
Canada
Royal Canadian Air Force and Royal Canadian Navy Ansons were retired in 1952
Czechoslovakia
Czechoslovak Air Force three aircraft, in service from 1945 to 1948
Egypt
Egyptian Air Force
Estonia
Estonian Air Force
Ethiopia
Ethiopian Air Force
Finland
Finnish Air Force three Avro Anson Mk. Is purchased 1936 and used as training and liaison aircraft. One lost and another written-off in accidents, last flight in 1947.
France
Free French Air Force and Aeronavale the Groupe 'Artois' in Equatorial Africa (AEF) received eight Mk. I in May 1943 and a further nine in December 1944.
Greece
Hellenic Royal Air Force: twelve Mk I Ansons were ordered in 1938 for the maritime patrol role. Five of these escaped to Egypt after the Battle of Greece and operated under British command until replaced by Blenheims in 1942.
India
Royal Indian Air Force
India
Indian Air Force
Iran
Imperial Iranian Air Force
Iraq
Royal Iraqi Air Force
Ireland
Irish Air Corps 9 Anson Mk1 delivered between 1937 and 1939 and used for training/maritime patrol/transport. 3 Anson 19s delivered in 1946 for training/transport. Mk1s retired by 1947, 19s by 1962.
Israel
Israeli Air Force
Netherlands
Royal Netherlands Air Force and Dutch Naval Aviation Service
New Zealand
Royal New Zealand Air Force
Norway
Royal Norwegian Air Force
Paraguay
Paraguayan Air Arm one Mk.V bought in Argentina in 1947.
Portugal
Portuguese Air Force
Rhodesia
Royal Rhodesian Air Force
Saudi Arabia
Royal Saudi Air Force
South Africa
South African Air Force
Southern Rhodesia
Southern Rhodesian Air Force
Syria
Syrian Air Force
Turkey
Turkish Air Force
United Kingdom
Royal Air Force (Initial Establishment + Immediate Reserve)

Mark. 1:

- 7, 24, 35, 44, 48, 51, 52, 58, 61, 63, 75, 76, 97, 104, 106, 108, 109, 116, 144, 147, 148, 173, 185, 192, 206, 207, 215, 217, 220, 224, 233, 251, 267, 269, 275, 276, 278, 280, 281, 282, 320, 321, 353, 500, 502, 510, 516, 544, 608 & 612 Squadron's RAF
- No. 1 (Observers) Advanced Flying Unit RAF (1942–45) (65 Ansons)
- No. 2 (Observers) Advanced Flying Unit RAF (1942–45) (47 Ansons)
- No. 3 (Observers) Advanced Flying Unit RAF (1942–45) (66 Ansons)
- No. 4 (Observers) Advanced Flying Unit RAF (1943–45) (51 Ansons)
- No. 6 (Observers) Advanced Flying Unit RAF (1943–44) (72 Ansons)
- No. 7 (Observers) Advanced Flying Unit RAF (1944–45) (61 Ansons)
- No. 8 (Observers) Advanced Flying Unit RAF (1943–45) (28+13 Ansons)
- No. 9 (Observers) Advanced Flying Unit RAF (1942–45) (80 Ansons)
- No. 10 (Observers) Advanced Flying Unit RAF (1942–45) (57 Ansons)
- No. 1 Air Gunners School RAF (1943–44) (26+10 Ansons)
- No. 2 Air Gunners School RAF (1943–44) (26+10 Ansons)
- No. 3 Air Gunners School RAF (1943–45) (33 Ansons)
- No. 4 Air Gunners School RAF (1943–44) (23 Ansons)
- No. 7 Air Gunners School RAF (1944) (27+10 Ansons)
- No. 8 Air Gunners School RAF (1944) (28 Ansons)
- No. 9 Air Gunners School RAF (1941–42)
- No. 10 Air Gunners School RAF (1944–45) (17+8 Ansons)
- No. 11 Air Gunners School RAF (1943–44) (16+7 Ansons)
- No. 12 Air Gunners School RAF (1943–44) (16+7 Ansons)
- No. 13 Air Gunners School RAF (1943–45)
- No. 1 Air Navigation School RAF (1947–49) (16 Ansons)
- No. 2 Air Navigation School RAF (1947–49) (16 Ansons)
- No. 3 Air Navigation School RAF (1948) (12 Ansons)
- No. 5 Air Navigation School RAF (1945–47)
- No. 7 Air Navigation School RAF (1945–47)
- No. 10 Air Navigation School RAF (1945–48)
- Air Navigation & Bombing School RAF (1944–45) (31+15 Ansons)
- No. 1 Air Observer & Navigator School RAF (1939–41) (24 Ansons)
- No. 2 Air Observer & Navigator School RAF (1939–40) (12 Ansons)
- No. 3 Air Observer & Navigator School RAF (1939–40 & 1941) (12 Ansons)
- No. 4 Air Observer & Navigator School RAF (1939–41) (12 Ansons)
- No. 5 Air Observer & Navigator School RAF (1939–40) (12 Ansons)
- No. 6 Air Observer & Navigator School RAF (1939–42) (20 Ansons)
- No. 8 Air Observer & Navigator School RAF (1939) (12 Ansons)
- No. 9 Air Observer & Navigator School RAF (1939–40) (12 Ansons)
- No. 10 Air Observer & Navigator School RAF (1939) (12 Ansons)
- No. 11 Air Observer & Navigator School RAF (1939–41) (12 Ansons)
- No. 1 Air Observers School RAF (1941–42) (36+18 Ansons)
- No. 2 Air Observers School RAF (1941–42) (6 Ansons)
- No. 3 Air Observers School RAF (1941–42) (44+22 Ansons)
- No. 4 Air Observers School RAF (1941–43) (4+2 Ansons)
- No. 5 Air Observers School RAF (1941–44)
- No. 6 Air Observers School RAF (1942–43) (48 Ansons)
- No. 7 Air Observers School RAF (1943–44) (56+27 Ansons)
- No. 9 Air Observers School RAF (1941–42) (18+8 Ansons)
- No. 10 Air Observers School RAF (1941–42) (4+2 Ansons)
- No. 6 Service Flying Training School RAF (1939–40 & 1945–47) (108 Ansons)
- No. 12 Service Flying Training School RAF (1939–40) (63 Ansons)
- No. 3 Radio School RAF (1941–42)
- No. 10 Radio School RAF (1943–45) (14+4 Ansons)
- No. 11 Radio School RAF (1942–44)
- No. 12 Radio School RAF (1943–46) (42+21 Ansons)
- No. 14 Radio School RAF (1944–46) (shared aircraft with 12 RS)

Mark. X:

- 24, 147 & 353 Squadron's RAF

C Mark. 11:

- No. 58 Squadron RAF (1946-47)

Mark. XII:

- 31, 116, 147, 167 & 187 Squadron's RAF

C Mark. 19:

- 8, 31, 58, 81, 116, 173, 187 & 527 Squadron's RAF

T Mark. 20:

- No. 3 Air Navigation School RAF (1948–51) (26 Ansons)
- No. 5 Air Navigation School RAF (1951–52)

T Mark. 21:

- No. 228 Squadron RAF (1959-60)
- No. 275 Squadron RAF (1954-59)
- No. 1 Air Navigation School RAF (1949–54) (17 Ansons)
- No. 2 Air Navigation School RAF (1949–70) (17 Ansons)
- No. 3 Air Navigation School RAF (1952–54)
- No. 5 Air Navigation School RAF (1951–52)
- No. 6 Air Navigation School RAF (1952–53)
- No. 1 Basic Air Navigation School RAF (1951–53)
- Central Navigation School RAF (1949–50)
- Central Navigation and Control School RAF (1950–1963)

T Mark. 22:

- No. 1 Air Electronics School RAF (1957–60)
- No. 1 Air Signallers School RAF (1951–57)
- No. 2 Air Signallers School RAF (1952–53)
- No. 4 Radio School RAF (1943–51)
- Empire Radio School RAF (1946–49)
- RAF Technical College (1951–60)

Fleet Air Arm

Mark. I:

- 700 Naval Air Squadron (1955-56)
- 703 Naval Air Squadron (1945-52)
- 707 Naval Air Squadron (1945)
- 710 Naval Air Squadron (1945)
- 711 Naval Air Squadron (1945)
- 719 Naval Air Squadron (1947-49)
- 720 Naval Air Squadron (1945-50)
- 724 Naval Air Squadron (1945-46)
- 725 Naval Air Squadron (1945)
- 728 Naval Air Squadron (1945)
- 732 Naval Air Squadron (1945)
- 735 Naval Air Squadron (1943-46)
- 737 Naval Air Squadron (1944-45)
  - 'X' Flight (1950-51)
- 739 Naval Air Squadron (1943-45)
- 740 Naval Air Squadron (1945)
- 742 Naval Air Squadron (1944-45)
- 744 Naval Air Squadron (1946-47 & 1951-53)
- 745 Naval Air Squadron (1943-44)
- 747 Naval Air Squadron (1943-45)
- 749 Naval Air Squadron (1945)
- 750 Naval Air Squadron (1952-53)
- 751 Naval Air Squadron (1947 & 1953-55)
- 758 Naval Air Squadron (1943-45)
- 762 Naval Air Squadron (1948)
- 763 Naval Air Squadron (1944-45)
- 766 Naval Air Squadron (1944-49)
- 771 Naval Air Squadron (1947-55)
- 772 Naval Air Squadron (1945-46)
- 778 Naval Air Squadron (1945-46)
- 781 Naval Air Squadron (1945 & 1951-53)
- 782 Naval Air Squadron (1946-49)
- 783 Naval Air Squadron (1942-49)
- 784 Naval Air Squadron (1942-46)
- 785 Naval Air Squadron (1945-46)
- 786 Naval Air Squadron (1944-45)
- 787 Naval Air Squadron (1945-46)
- 'X' Flight (1945)
- 789 Naval Air Squadron (1944-45)
- 790 Naval Air Squadron (1946-47)
- 792 Naval Air Squadron (1948-50)
- 798 Naval Air Squadron (1945)
- 799 Naval Air Squadron (1945-46)
- 809 Naval Air Squadron (1950)
- 1830 Naval Air Squadron (1953)
- 1832 Naval Air Squadron (1949-50)
- 1833 Naval Air Squadron (1949-54)
- 1840 Naval Air Squadron (1951-53)
- 1841 Naval Air Squadron (1953)

Mark. II:

- 745 Naval Air Squadron (1943-45)

Mark. V:

- 743 Naval Air Squadron (1949)

Mark. C.X:

- 701 Naval Air Squadron (1945)

Mark. C.XII:

- 773 Naval Air Squadron (1945)
- 781 Naval Air Squadron (1946)
- 782 Naval Air Squadron (1947)
- 790 Naval Air Squadron (1945)
- 799 Naval Air Squadron (1945)

Mark. C.XIX:

- 'X' Flight of 781 Naval Air Squadron (1946-47)

United States
50 Canadian built Ansons were delivered to the USAAF as the AT-20.
Yugoslavia
SFR Yugoslav Air Force

== Civilian operators ==
Argentina
At least six examples on the register known, mostly ex-Canadian, often with multiple owners, and multiple (Argentine) registrations

- LV-FBR, a new-build Avro 19Srs2, last recorded as damaged in an accident 14-10-1962
- LV-AGJ & LV-AGN, both SAETA (Servicios Aéreos Explotacion Transporte Aéreo), & other operators
- LV-ADI (unknown operator) briefly on the register, emergency landing 03/08/47 whilst on cargo flight, then passed on to FAP (Paraguay AF), wfu 1948
- LV-AGI ZONDA (Zonas Oeste y Norte de Aerolineas Argentinas), later IFTA (Instituto Fototopográfico Argentino) & re-registered LV-FBU, noted as damaged in accidents dated 1952, 1959 & 1963
- LV-GJA featured in an incident dated 19-03-1960, then to Brazil?

Australia

- Woods Airways, WA (two surplus aircraft, 1948 to 1961)
- Brain & Brown Airfreighters (one Anson until at least 1977)
- East-West Airlines, one preserved (non-flying), at Tamworth Airport

Belgian Congo
three Belgium-registered ex RAF MkIs for Institut Geographique du Congo Belge
Brazil
at least nine ex-RCAF MkIIs,

- LATB Linha Aérea Transcontinental Brasileira - five aircraft,
- Companhia Meridional de Transportes - three aircraft operated between 1945 and 1946

Bahrain

- Gulf Aviation

Cuba
a total of ten Canadian-built Ansons have appeared on the Cuban register, three of which were operated by ANSA-Aerolíneas del Norte S.A. from 1947 until the mid-1950s
India
15 new-build aircraft; including 12 Mk18C for the new Directorate of Civil Aviation, and two Avro 19Srs2 for Bharat Airways, Calcutta (later merged into Indian Airlines)
Indonesia
Government of Indonesia chartered 2 Ansons during Indonesian National Revolution
Portuguese Timor
Transportes Aéreos de Timor operated two Anson Is.
United Kingdom

- Blue Line Airways (Nottingham) - three MkIs (1946–50)
- British European Airways 13-16 aircraft inherited from Railway Air Services & others, rapidly phased out (1947–50)
- British Midland / Derby Airways three (1955–65)
- Finglands Airways (Manchester) one MkI (1949–53)
- Hunting-Clan Air Transport Three Avro C19 Srs1 (1946–48)
- Imperial Airways - launch customer, two Avro 652 (1935–1939, both impressed into Fleet Air Arm 1941)
- Ministry of Civil Aviation (1948–54)
- Railway Air Services 14 aircraft (1945–47), most subsequently absorbed into British European Airways fleet
- Sivewright Airways (1946–51)
- Starways one Mk1 (1950)
- Transair (UK) up to 10 airworthy examples, plus five more used for spares, (1950–52)
- Wiltshire School of Flying (1954)
