= RNAS Dunino =

Former Royal Naval Air Station in Fife, Scotland

RNAS Dunino HMS Jackdaw II RAF Dunino
- Dunino Aerodrome
- Dunino, Fife in Scotland

Site information
- Type: Royal Naval Air Station
- Owner: Air Ministry; Admiralty
- Operator: Royal Air Force; 1941 - 1942; Royal Navy; 1942 - 1946
- Controlled by: RAF Fighter Command; Fleet Air Arm
- Condition: Disused
- Function: Satellite to RNAS Crail

Location
- Shown within Fife RNAS Dunino (the United Kingdom)
- Coordinates: 56°17′25″N 002°42′20″W

Site history
- Built: 1940
- In use: 1941-1946
- Fate: Farmland

Garrison information
- Occupants: Flying units: 770 Fleet Requirements Unit; See Units section for full list.

Airfield information
- Elevation: 75 metres (246 ft) AMSL
Runways
Direction	Length and surface
09/27	1,284 yards (1,174 m) Sommerfeld tracking
05/23	1,200 yards (1,097 m) Grass
09/27	1,400 yards (1,280 m) Grass
16/24	900 yards (823 m) Grass
- Source: Royal Navy Research Archive

Royal Naval Air Station Dunino, or more simply RNAS Dunino; (commissioned HMS Jackdaw II) is a former Royal Navy Naval Air Station located 1.8 miles (2.9 km) west of Kingsbarns, Fife, Scotland and 4.6 miles (7.4 km) south east of St Andrews, Fife.

== History ==
The base started life as RAF Dunino. No. 309 Polish Fighter-Reconnaissance Squadron used it from 8 May 1941, equipped with the Westland Lysander IIIA and then, from 1942, the North American Mustang I. The squadron had detachments at RAF Gatwick, RAF Longman and RAF Findo Gask and left on 26 November 1942, going to RAF Findo Gask. The airfield was then transferred to the Royal Navy and renamed RNAS Dunino (HMS Jackdaw II). The first naval squadron was 825 Naval Air Squadron, which operated the Fairey Swordfish from Dunino between February and March 1943.

Between April 1943 and August 1943, the base was used by 827 Naval Air Squadron equipped with Fairey Barracudas, and then, between February 1943 and September 1943, by 737 Naval Air Squadron flying Supermarine Walrus amphibians. Between December 1943 and January 1944, the base was home to 813 Naval Air Squadron flying Swordfish torpedo bombers.

== Units ==
A number of units were here at some point:

Polish Air Forces in France and Great Britain

- No. 309 Polish Fighter-Reconnaissance Squadron

Royal Navy

- No. 5 Barracuda Servicing Unit
- 737 Naval Air Squadron
- 770 Naval Air Squadron
- 785 Naval Air Squadron
- 786 Naval Air Squadron
- 813 Naval Air Squadron
- 820 Naval Air Squadron
- 824 Naval Air Squadron
- 825 Naval Air Squadron
- 827 Naval Air Squadron
- 833 Naval Air Squadron
- 837 Naval Air Squadron
- 837 'A' Flight
- 837 'D' Flight
- 838 Naval Air Squadron
- 860 Naval Air Squadron

== Remains ==
The derelict control tower remains, but everything else appears to have been either demolished or removed.

== See also ==
- List of air stations of the Royal Navy
- List of former Royal Air Force stations
