= 833 Naval Air Squadron =

Inactive flying squadron of the Royal Navy's Fleet Air Arm

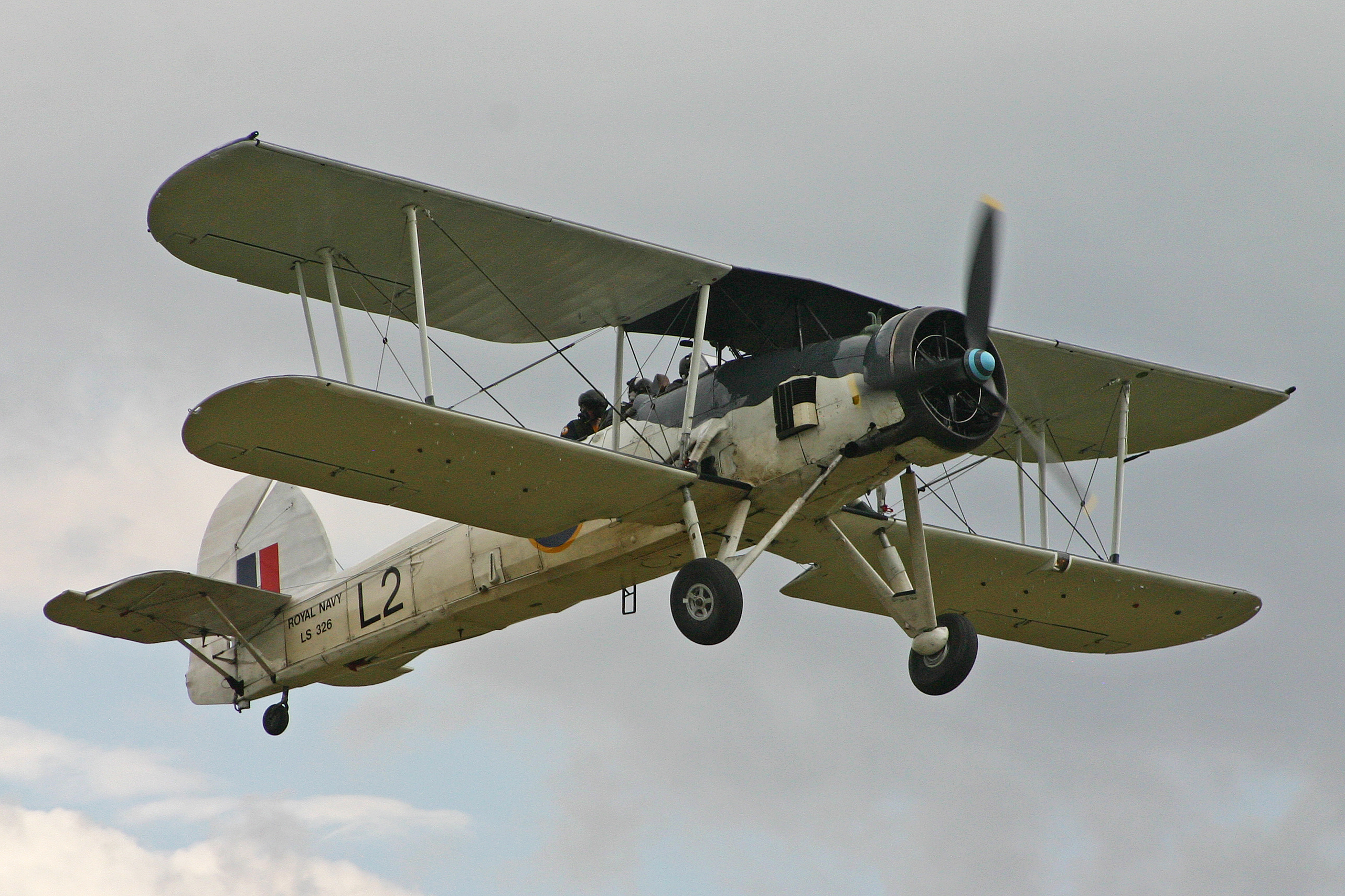
- Fairey Swordfish II; an example of the type used by 833 NAS
- Active: 1941–1944; 1944
- Disbanded: 13 September 1944
- Country: United Kingdom
- Branch: Royal Navy
- Type: Torpedo Spotter Reconnaissance
- Role: Carrier-based: anti-submarine warfare (ASW); anti-surface warfare (ASuW); Maritime patrol; Combat air patrol (CAP)
- Size: six / twelve aircraft
- Part of: Fleet Air Arm
- Home station: See Naval air stations section for full list.
- Engagements: World War II: Operation Avalanche; Battle of the Atlantic; Arctic convoys of World War II
- Battle honours: North Africa 1942; Atlantic 1944; Arctic 1944

Insignia
- Identification Markings: single letters (Swordfish); 5A+ (Swordfish June 1943); 5A+ (Seafire); single letters (Wildcat)

Aircraft flown
- Bomber: Fairey Swordfish
- Fighter: Supermarine Seafire; Grumman Wildcat

833 Naval Air Squadron (833 NAS) is an inactive Fleet Air Arm (FAA) naval air squadron of the United Kingdom’s Royal Navy (RN). The unit was last operational during World War II, primarily utilising the Fairey Swordfish torpedo bomber throughout the conflict. It also incorporated two fighter aircraft into its inventory. In 1943 the Supermarine Seafire, followed by the Grumman Wildcat in 1944, which were employed for combat air patrol (CAP) missions.

A Torpedo Spotter Reconnaissance (TSR) squadron, it was created in December 1941 for HMS Dasher. After the ship exploded, the squadron was reduced in strength and joined HMS Biter in September 1942. It was tasked with supporting the North African landings and was divided in October, with 'A' Flight staying on HMS Biter and 'B' Flight on HMS Avenger, each having three Fairey Swordfish. The squadron regrouped on land at Gibraltar in November and boarded HMS Argus to return to HMS Blackcap, RNAS Stretton. In February 1943, it relocated to RAF Thorney Island to work with RAF Coastal Command, taking over 825 Naval Air Squadron's planes for operations over the English Channel. It moved to Scotland in April, increasing in strength at HMS Landrail, RNAS Machrihanish and added a flight of six Supermarine Seafire fighters in June, at RAF Ballykelly, in Northern Ireland. In July, the squadron embarked in HMS Stalkerto protect a convoy to Gibraltar. Afterward, the Supermarine Seafire aircraft were transferred to 880 Naval Air Squadron, and the Fairey Swordfish became 833Z Sqn. The squadron regrouped at HMS Landrail with nine aircraft in October, aiming to provide MAC-ship flights of three aircraft each, but was disbanded into 836 Naval Air Squadron in January 1944.

Reformed in April 1944, on the escort carrier HMS Activity, with three Fairey Swordfish from 836 Naval Air Squadron and seven Grumman Wildcat from 816 and 819 Naval Air Squadrons. It protected an Arctic convoy and later two North Atlantic convoys, then covered a Gibraltar convoy before disbanding at HMS Gannet, RNAS Eglinton, Northern Ireland, in September 1944.

== History ==
=== Torpedo, Spotter, Reconnaissance squadron (1941-1944) ===
833 Naval Air Squadron was formed on 8 December 1941, as a Torpedo Bomber Reconnaissance unit. It was equipped with nine Fairey Swordfish I biplane torpedo bombers and was led by Lieutenant Commander R.J.H. Stephens of the Royal Navy. Established at RNAS Lee-on-Solent (HMS Daedalus) in Hampshire and originally intended for the Avenger-class escort carrier, HMS Dasher, however, on 27 March 1943, the carrier experienced a significant internal explosion, leading to its sinking in the Firth of Clyde.

In May 1942, the squadron was diminished to six aircraft and subsequently boarded the Avenger-class escort carrier HMS Biter in September, departing from RNAS Machrihanish (HMS Landrail) located in Argyll and Bute. Tasked with overseeing the North African landings, the squadron was divided in October 1942, with 'A' Flight staying on HMS Biter and 'B' Flight on the lead ship of her class, HMS Avenger, each equipped with three Fairey Swordfish II aircraft. After regrouping on land at RN Air Section Gibraltar, located at RAF North Front, Gibraltar, on 11 November 1942, the squadron boarded the carrier HMS Argus on 25 December, to return to their base, RNAS Stretton (HMS Blackcap), Cheshire.

In February 1943, 833 Naval Air Squadron was assigned to RAF Coastal Command. Relocating to RAF Thorney Island, Sussex, it assumed control of the aircraft from 825 Naval Air Squadron to conduct night patrols, mine laying operations, and shipping assaults in the English Channel. By April, the squadron had moved north to Scotland, expanding its fleet to nine aircraft, and in June, a fighter flight comprising six Supermarine Seafire L Mk.IIc fighter aircraft was incorporated.

In July 1943, the Supermarine Seafire aircraft and six Fairey Swordfish were deployed aboard the Attacker-class escort carrier, HMS Stalker, to provide air cover for a convoy heading to Gibraltar. Subsequently, the Supermarine Seafire fighters were reassigned to 880 Naval Air Squadron, while the Fairey Swordfish were integrated into 833Z Naval Air Squadron.

Upon its return to the United Kingdom, the squadron's strength was reinstated to nine Fairey Swordfish II. In December, it relocated to RNAS Maydown, County Londonderry, for Merchant Aircraft Carrier (MAC-Ship) operations; however, due to a policy shift, this operation was centralised, leading to its disbandment on 7 January 1944, after which it became 'N' Flight of 836 Naval Air Squadron.

=== Torpedo, Bomber, Reconnaissance squadron (1944) ===
The squadron reformed on 26 April 1944, aboard the escort carrier HMS Activity, incorporating three Fairey Swordfish II from 836 Naval Air Squadron and seven Grumman Wildcat Mk V fighters from 816 and 819 Naval Air Squadrons.

It was established while the carrier was located at Kola Bay in Northern Russia. Subsequently, the composite squadron conducted anti-submarine patrols and offered fighter protection for the returning convoy, convoy RA 59, air support was extended to the joint convoys OS78 and KMS52, which were en route to Gibraltar and West Africa on the 22 and 23 May. Subsequently, for the joint inward convoy SL158 and MKS 49 travelled from Gibraltar to Liverpool starting on 28 May and for the combined outward Convoy OS78/KMS52 on 2 June and the combined inward Convoy SL159/MKS50 on 3 June. The subsequent deployment involved the escort of the military convoy KMF33 from the United Kingdom to Gibraltar. The convoy departed from the Clyde on 18 July and reached Gibraltar on 28.

The unit returned to the United Kingdom and was officially disbanded at RNAS Eglinton (HMS Gannet), located in County Londonderry, Northern Ireland, on 13 September 1944.

== Aircraft operated ==
The squadron has operated a couple of different aircraft types:

- Fairey Swordfish I torpedo bomber (December 1941 - November 1942)
- Fairey Swordfish II torpedo bomber (May 1942 - September 1944)
- Supermarine Seafire L Mk.IIc fighter aircraft (June - September 1943)
- Grumman Wildcat Mk V fighter aircraft (April - August 1944)

== Battle honours ==
The Battle Honours awarded to 833 Naval Air Squadron are:

- North Africa 1942
- Atlantic 1944
- Arctic 1944

== Naval air stations ==
833 Naval Air Squadron operated from a number of naval air stations of the Royal Navy, and Royal Air Force stations in the UK and overseas, and also a number of Royal Navy escort carriers:

1941 - 1944

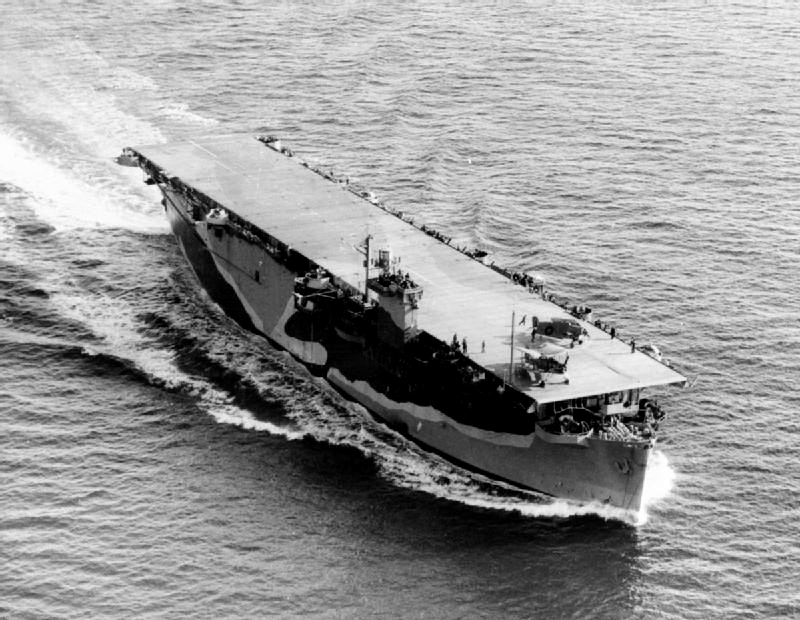
HMS Biter

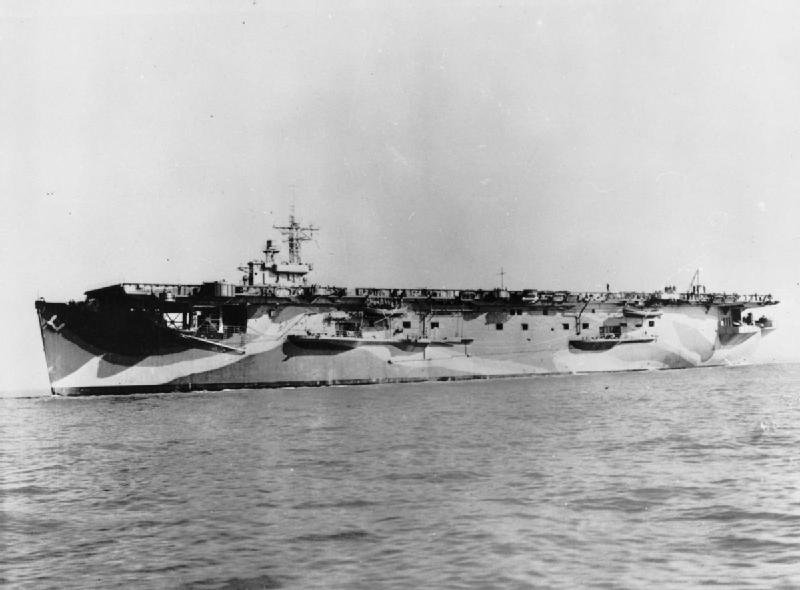
HMS Stalker

- Royal Naval Air Station Lee-on-Solent (HMS Daedalus), Hampshire, (8 December 1941 - 1 January 1942)
- Royal Air Force Gosport, Hampshire, (1 - 2 January 1942)
- Royal Naval Air Station Lee-on-Solent (HMS Daedalus), Hampshire, (2 - 30 January 1942)
- Royal Naval Air Station Crail (HMS Jackdaw), Fife, (30 January - 20 March 1942)
- Royal Naval Air Station Hatston (HMS Sparrowhawk), Mainland, Orkney, (20 March - 3 April 1942)
- Royal Naval Air Station Machrihanish (HMS Landrail), Argyll and Bute, (3 April - 3 September 1942)
- HMS Biter (3 September - 3 October 1942)
- Royal Naval Air Station Stretton (HMS Blackap), Cheshire, (3 - 23 October 1942)
  - 'A' Flight
    - HMS Biter (23 October - 13 November 1942)
  - 'B' Flight
    - HMS Avenger(23 October - 11 November 1942)
  - RN Air Section Gibraltar, Gibraltar, (Detachment two aircraft 5–11 November 1942)
- RN Air Section Gibraltar, Gibraltar, (13 November - 19 December 1942)
  - HMS Archer (Detachment two aircraft 22–26 November 1942)
- HMS Argus (19 December 1942 - 1 January 1943)
- Royal Naval Air Station Stretton (HMS Blackap), Cheshire, (1 January - 1 February 1943)
- Royal Air Force Thorney Island, Sussex, (16 Gp), (1 February - 10 March 1943)
- Royal air Force St Eval, Cornwall, (19 Gp) (10 March - 15 April 1943)
- Royal Naval Air Station Machrihanish (HMS Landrail), Argyll and Bute, (15 April - 31 May 1943)
- Royal Air Force Ballykelly, County Londonderry, (31 May - 15 June 1943)
- Royal Naval Air Station Machrihanish (HMS Landrail), Argyll and Bute, (15 June - 6 July 1943)
- HMS Stalker (6 July - 18 August 1943)
  - Royal Naval Air Station Machrihanish (HMS Landrail), Argyll and Bute, (Detachment three 29 July - 6 October 1943)
- RN Air Section Gibraltar, Gibraltar, (10 August - 25 September 1943)
- HMS Stalker (25 September - 6 October 1943)
- Royal Naval Air Station Machrihanish (HMS Landrail), Argyll and Bute, (6 - 7 October 1943)
- Royal Naval Air Station Dunino (HMS Jackdaw II), Fife, (7 October - 13 December 1943)
- Royal Naval Air Station Maydown, County Londonderry, (13 December 1943)
- disbanded - (7 January 1944)

1944

- HMS Activity (26 April - 13 June 1944)
- Royal Naval Air Station Machrihanish (HMS Landrail), Argyll and Bute, (13 - 16 June 1944)
- HMS Activity (16 June - 28 August (Grumman Wildcat), 8 September (Fairey Swordfish) 1944)
- Royal Naval Air Station Eglinton (HMS Gannet), County Londonderry, (Grumman Wildcat), (28 August - 30 September 1944)
- Royal Naval Air Station Maydown (HMS Shrike), County Londonderry, (Fairey Swordfish), (8 - 30 September 1944)
- disbanded - (30 September 1944)

== Commanding officers ==
List of commanding officers of 833 Naval Air Squadron:

1941 - 1944

- Lieutenant Commander R.J.H. Stephens, RN, from 8 December 1941
- Captain W.G.S. Aston, RM, from 14 January 1943
- Lieutenant Commander J.R.C. Callander, RN, from 17 May 1943
- disbanded - 7 January 1944

1944

- Lieutenant(A) J.G. Large, RNVR, from 26 April 1944 (Lieutenant Commander, DSC 15 May 1944)
- disbanded - 30 September 1944

Note: Abbreviation (A) signifies Air Branch of the RN or RNVR.
