= 837 Naval Air Squadron =

Inactive flying squadron of the Royal Navy's Fleet Air Arm

- Squadron badge
- Active: 1942–1943; 1944–1947
- Disbanded: 6 October 1947
- Country: United Kingdom
- Branch: Royal Navy
- Type: Torpedo Bomber Reconnaissance squadron
- Role: Carrier-based: anti-submarine warfare (ASW); anti-surface warfare (ASuW); Maritime patrol
- Part of: Fleet Air Arm
- Home station: See Naval air stations section for full list.
- Engagements: World War II: Battle of the Atlantic; Pacific War
- Battle honours: Atlantic 1943

Commanders
- Notable commanders: Captain Alexander Stephen Whitworth, DSC, RN

Insignia
- Squadron Badge Description: Red, in base water barry wavy of four white and blue a Chinese dragon reguardant in the dexter claw three flashes of lightning and in chief a sun in splendour all gold surmounted by a decrescent white (1947)
- Identification Markings: single letters (Swordfish); single letters (Barracuda); Y1A+ (Barracuda April 1945); 370-381 (Barracuda September 1945); 270-283 (Firefly)
- Fin Carrier Code: L (Barracuda September 1945); Y:R (Firefly)

Aircraft flown
- Bomber: Fairey Swordfish; Fairey Barracuda
- Reconnaissance: Fairey Firefly

837 Naval Air Squadron (837 NAS), also known as 837 Squadron, is an inactive Fleet Air Arm (FAA) naval air squadron of the United Kingdom's Royal Navy (RN). It last operated with Fairey Firefly I / FR.I fighter / reconnaissance aircraft from October 1945 to October 1947, in the Far East.

Established in January 1942, at HMS Buzzard, RNAS Palisadoes, Jamaica, the squadron began as a Torpedo Bomber Reconnaissance (TBR) unit. In October, it relocated to Floyd Bennett Field in New York, preparing to board the escort carrier HMS Dasher in July, to escort a North Atlantic convoy that departed in August. Upon arrival, the squadron operated from various shore bases, with its numbers fluctuating. In January 1943, the squadron split into two flights: 837A Flight was assigned to HMS Argus for anti-submarine protection of a convoy to Gibraltar, while 837D Flight reboarded HMS Dasher for a convoy to Iceland. When HMS Dasher exploded in the Firth of Clyde on 27 March, 837D was on land, and the squadron regrouped at HMS Jackdaw II, RNAS Dunino, Fife, two days later. After completing deck landing training on HMS Argus in late April 1943, the squadron was disbanded in June, becoming 'Z' Flight of 886 Naval Air Squadron at HMS Landrail, RNAS Machrihanish.

Reformed at HMS Blackcap, RNAS Stretton, Cheshire, in August 1944, the unit continued as a TBR squadron, officially designated to operate Fairey Barracuda Mk II. However, the first aircraft did not arrive until September at HMS Daedalus, RNAS Lee-on-Solent, Hampshire. The squadron relocated to HMS Owl, RNAS Fearn, Scotland, in November and by December it had eighteen aircraft. In April 1945, it embarked in the light fleet carrier HMS Glory, using HMS Wagtail, RNAS Ayr, Scotland, as a shore base and set sail to join the British Pacific Fleet in May 1945. The squadron's strength was reduced by half until a visit to HMS Grebe, RNAS Dekheila, Egypt, in late May 1945 allowed it to increase to twelve aircraft before joining the 16th Carrier Air Group. Although the war concluded before the squadron could engage in combat, it remained with the carrier, utilising various shore bases in the Far East and Australia, and was present for the Japanese surrender at Rabaul.

In October, it changed its aircraft in Australia with Fairey Firefly FR.I. These aircraft were then re-embarked in HMS Glory in January 1946 for operations in the East Indies Fleet and the Far East. In June 1947, the squadron re-embarked from HMS Nabrock, RNAS Singapore, and after a tour in Australia, returned home to disband upon arrival in October 1947.

== History ==
=== Torpedo, bomber, reconnaissance squadron (1942-1943) ===
On 15 March 1942, members of 837 Naval Air Squadron gathered at RNAS Eastleigh (HMS Raven) and RNAS Worthy Down (HMS Kestrel), both located in Hampshire. They departed on 3 April aboard the MS Port Phillip, heading for Jamaica.

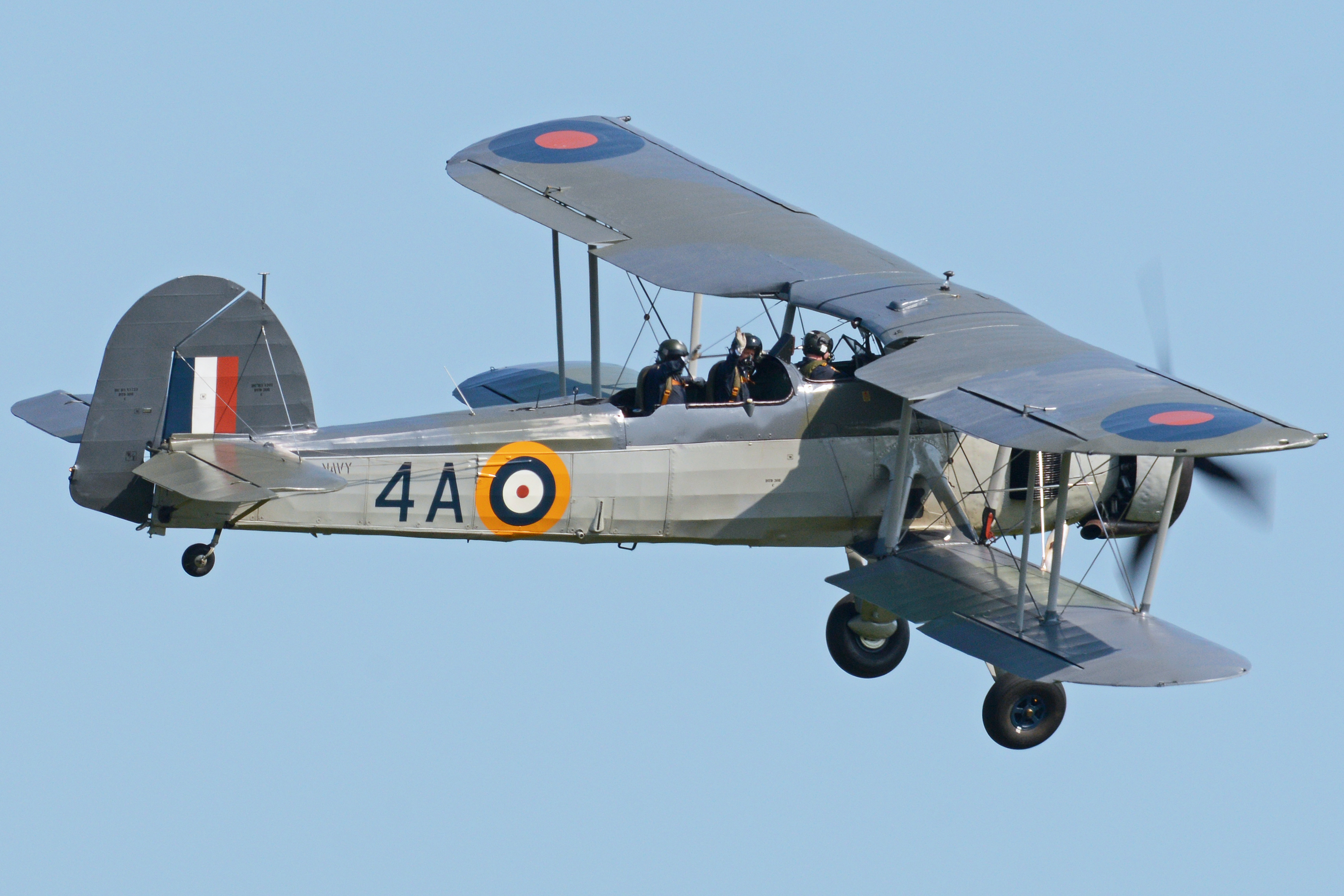
Fairey Swordfish I; an example of the type used by 837 Squadron

The squadron was then officially established at Royal Naval Air Station Palisadoes (HMS Buzzard), at Kingston, Jamaica, on 1 May 1942, under the command of Lieutenant Commander A.S. Whitworth, DSC, RN. It was designated as a torpedo, bomber, reconnaissance (TBR) squadron and equipped with four Fairey Swordfish I biplane torpedo bombers.

Two months later, they traveled north to the Royal Navy Air Section at Floyd Bennett Field in New York, where the Admiralty had been granted lodger rights for the Royal Navy Air Section and disembarked squadrons. Subsequently, they boarded the Avenger-class escort carrier, HMS Dasher, on 25 May 1942, assigned to conduct anti-submarine patrols while en route to the United Kingdom.

HMS Dasher experienced engine issues, which delayed its departure until 25 August. It then made its way to Boston, Massachusetts, to join convoy BX 35B on 28. The vessel reached Halifax, Nova Scotia, on 30 August and subsequently joined convoy HX 205 for its journey to Liverpool, England. On 10 September, the escort carrier separated from the convoy near Ireland and proceeded to deploy 837 Naval Air Squadron at RNAS Campbeltown (HMS Landrail II) in Argyll and Bute, Scotland.

Upon arrival, strength was expanded to six aircraft, which included several Fairey Swordfish II biplanes; however, by September, the number had dwindled back to just two aircraft. By the end of the year, the squadron had returned to six aircraft and was reorganised into two flights in January 1943. ‘A’ Flight was assigned to HMS Argus to offer anti-submarine protection for a convoy heading to Gibraltar, while ‘D’ Flight re embarked in HMS Dasher for a convoy mission to Iceland.

On 27 March 1943, HMS Dasher experienced a significant internal explosion, leading to its sinking in the Firth of Clyde. ‘D’ Flight was on land at the time and the squadron regrouped in Scotland at RNAS Dunino (HMS Jackdaw II), Fife, in late March, then relocated to RNAS Machrihanish (HMS Landrail), Argyll and Bute, in April, where they conducted deck-landing training aboard HMS Argus. Following additional training sessions in Northern Ireland at RAF Ballykelly and RNAS Eglinton (HMS Gannet), both County Londonderry, the squadron returned to and disbanded at RNAS Machrihanish, to be designated as 'B' Flight of 886 Naval Air Squadron.

=== Barracuda (1944-1945) ===
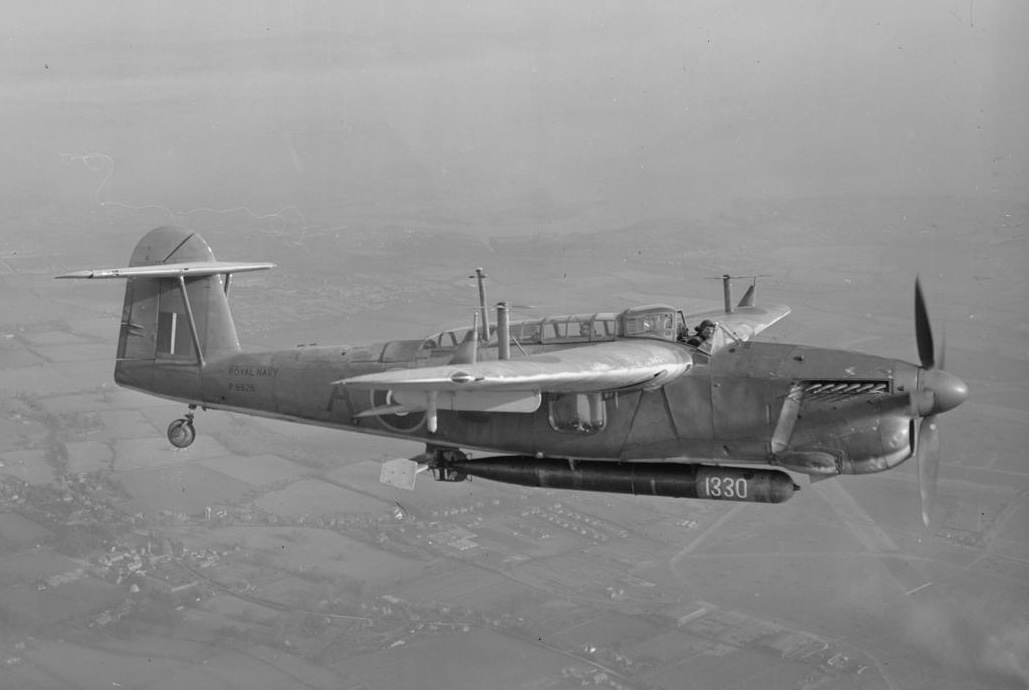
Fairey Barracuda Mk II; an example of the type used by 837 Squadron

Reformed at RNAS Stretton (HMS Blackcap), Cheshire, on 1 August 1944, the unit continued to function as a Torpedo, Bomber, Reconnaissance (TBR) unit, officially designated with a complement of sixteen Fairey Barracuda Mk II aircraft. These were a three-crew, British torpedo and dive bomber aircraft, powered by a single 1,640 hp Rolls-Royce Merlin 32 engine. However, the first of these aircraft was not received until 4 September, when the unit was located at RNAS Lee-on-Solent (HMS Daedalus), Hampshire.

In November, the squadron relocated north, to RNAS Fearn (HMS Owl), Scottish Highlands. By April 1945, 837 Naval Air Squadron had embarked in the Colossus-class light fleet carrier, HMS Glory, alongside 1831 Naval Air Squadron, with both units becoming components of the 16th Carrier Air Group. This included a month-long stop for the squadron at HMS Grebe , the Royal Naval Air Station at Dekheila, Alexandria, Egypt, before proceeding to Ceylon to serve with the British Pacific Fleet.

The Second World War concluded prior to the squadron's engagement in combat; however, it continued to operate alongside the ship, utilising several shore bases in the Far East and Australia.

HMS Glory reached Sydney, Australia, on 16 August, where it disembarked the 16th Carrier Air Group, comprising the Vought Corsair equipped 1831 and Fairey Barracuda of 837 Naval Air Squadrons, at RNAS Schofields (HMS Nabthorpe) in New South Wales. Subsequently, a couple of weeks later on 1 September, the 16th Carrier Air Group re-embarked aboard the carrier.

It played a role in overseeing the Japanese surrender at Rabaul, Papua New Guinea. On 6 September 1945, Japanese General Hitoshi Imamura and Vice Admiral Jinichi Kusaka Lboarded the aircraft carrier HMS Glory, where they formally signed a document of surrender.

=== Firefly (1945-1947) ===
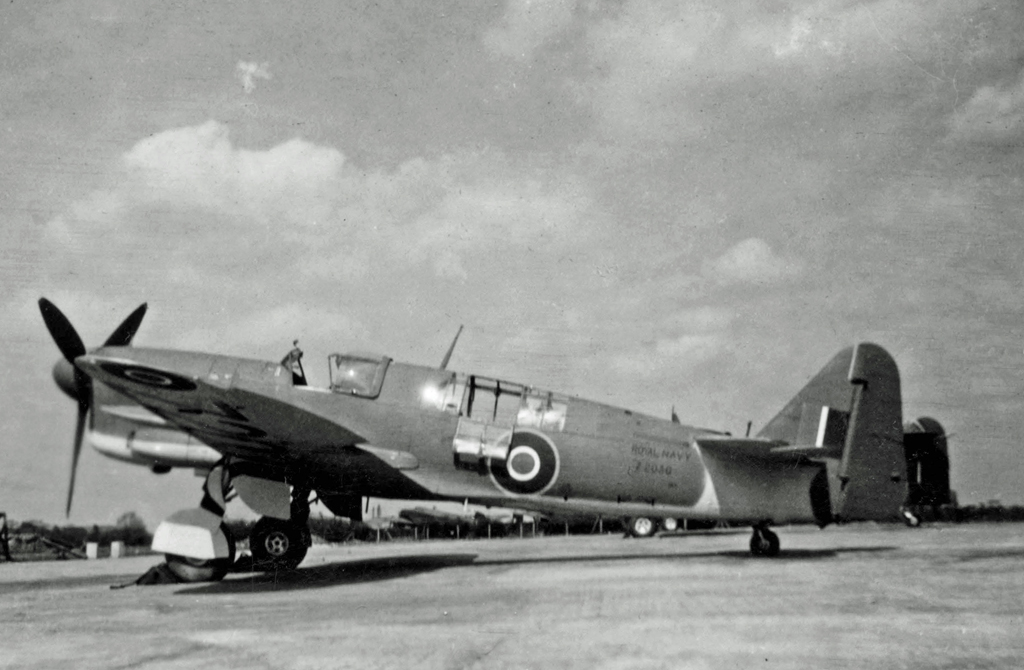
Fairey Firefly FR.1; an example of the type used by 837 Squadron

In October, the squadron was re-equipped in Australia with twelve Fairey Firefly FR.I, a British carrier-borne fighter and reconnaissance aircraft. Subsequently, in January 1946, these aircraft were re-embarked aboard HMS Glory for deployment with the East Indies Fleet.

In June 1947, the squadron re-embarked from RNAS Sembawang (HMS Simbang), Singapore and following a tour in Australia, returned home, where it was disbanded upon arrival on 6 October.

== Aircraft flown ==
The squadron has flown a number of different aircraft types, including:

- Fairey Swordfish I torpedo bomber (May 1942 - June 1943)
- Fairey Swordfish II torpedo bomber (June 1942 - June 1943)
- Fairey Barracuda Mk II torpedo and dive bomber (September 1944 - October 1945)
- Fairey Firefly I / FR.I fighter / reconnaissance aircraft (October 1945 -October 1947)

== Battle honours ==
The Battle Honours awarded to 837 Naval Air Squadron are:

- Atlantic 1943

== Assignments ==
837 Naval Air Squadron was assigned as needed to form part of a number of larger units:

- 16th Carrier Air Group (30 June 1945 - 6 October 1947)

== Naval air stations ==
837 Naval Air Squadron operated from a number of naval air stations of the Royal Navy, and Royal Air Force stations in the UK and overseas, and also a Royal Navy fleet carrier and a number of escort carriers and other airbases overseas:

1942 - 1942

- Royal Naval Air Station Eastleigh (HMS Raven), Hampshire, (15 March - 3 April 1942)
- MS Port Philip (passage) (3 April - 24 May 1942)
- Royal Naval Air Station Palisadoes (HMS Buzzard), Jamaica, (24 May - 7 July 1942)
- transit (7 - 10 July 1942)
- RN Air Section Floyd Bennett Field, Brooklyn, New York, (10 - 25 July 1942)
- HMS Dasher (25 July - 10 September 1942)
- Royal Naval Air Station Campbeltown (HMS Landrail II), Argyll and Bute, (10 - 13 September 1942)
- Royal Naval Air Station Lee-on-Solent (HMS Daedalus), Hampshire, (13 September - 19 October 1942)
- Royal Naval Air Station St Merryn (HMS Vulture), Cornwall, (19 October - 17 November 1942)
- Royal Naval Air Station Hatston (HMS Sparrowhawk), Mainland, Orkney, (17 November - 30 December 1942)
- Royal Naval Air Station Crail (HMS Jackdaw), Fife, (30 December 1942 - 29 March 1943)
  - 837 'A' Flight (three aircraft):
    - HMS Argus (15 - 31 January 1943)
    - RN Air Section Gibraltar, Gibraltar, (31 January - 4 February 1943)
    - HMS Argus (4 - 9 February 1943)
    - Royal Naval Air Station Crail (HMS Jackdaw), Fife, (9 - 25 February 1943)
    - Royal Naval Air Station Dunino (HMS Jackdaw II), Fife, (25 February - 29 March 1943)
  - 837 'D' Flight (three aircraft):
    - HMS Dasher (22 January - 26 February 1943)
    - Royal Naval Air Station Hatston (HMS Sparrowhawk), Mainland, Orkney, (26 February - 29 March 1943)
    - Royal Naval Air Station Dunino (HMS Jackdaw II), Fife, (29 March 1943)
- Royal Naval Air Station Dunino (HMS Jackdaw II), Fife, (reunited) (29 March - 14 April 1943)
- Royal Naval Air Station Machrihanish (HMS Landrail), Argyll and Bute, (14 April - 19 May 1943)
  - HMS Argus (Deck Landing Training (DLT) 16 - 28 April 1943)
- Royal Air Force Ballykelly, County Londonderry, (19 - 30 May 1943)
- Royal Naval Air Station Eglinton (HMS Gannet), County Londondderry, (30 May - 15 June 1943)
- Royal Naval Air Station Machrihanish (HMS Landrail), Argyll and Bute, became 886 Naval Air Squadron 'B' Flight - (15 June 1943)

1944 - 1947

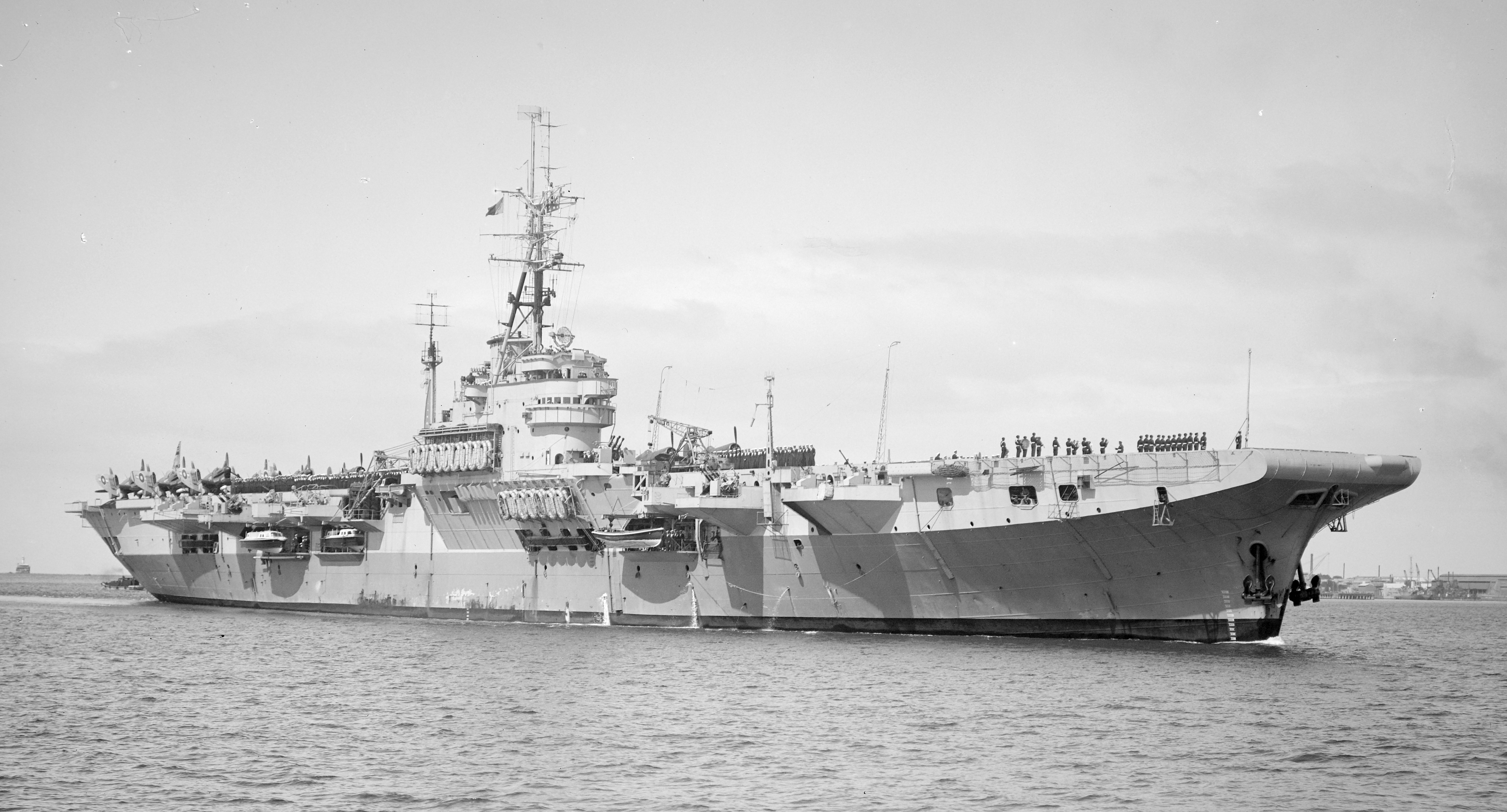
HMS Glory

- Royal Naval Air Station Stretton (HMS Blackcap), Cheshire, (1 - 31 August 1944)
- Royal Naval Air Station Lee-on-Solent (HMS Daedalus), Hampshire, (31 August - 5 November 1944)
- Royal Naval Air Station Fearn (HMS Owl), Scottish Highlands, (5 November 1944 - 2 April 1945)
- Royal Naval Air Station Ayr (HMS Wagtail), South Ayrshire, (2 - 4 April 1945)
- HMS Glory (4 - 18 April 1945)
- Royal Naval Air Station Ayr (HMS Wagtail), South Ayrshire, (18 April - 11 May 1945)
- HMS Glory (11 - 24 May 1945)
- Royal Naval Air Station Dekheila (HMS Grebe), Alexandria, Egypt, (24 May - 25 June 1945)
- HMS Glory (25 June - 15 July 1945)
- Royal Naval Air Station Katukurunda (HMS Ukussa), Ceylon, (15 - 27 July 1945)
- HMS Glory (27 July - 16 August 1945)
- Royal Naval Air Station Schofields (HMS Nabthorpe), New South Wales, (16 August - 1 September 1945)
- HMS Glory (1 - 11 September 1945)
- Royal Naval Air Station Jervis Bay (HMS Nabswick), Jervis Bay Territory, (11 September - 29 October 1945)
- Royal Naval Air Station Nowra (HMS Nabbington), New South Wales, (29 October 1945 - 14 January 1946)
- HMS Glory (14 January - 15 February 1946)
- RAAF Station Williamtown, New south Wales, (15 February - 10 June 1946)
- HMS Glory (10 June - 9 August 1946)
- Royal Naval Air Station Trincomalee (HMS Bambara), Ceylon, (9 August - 20 September 1946)
- HMS Glory (20 September - 1 October 1946)
- Royal Naval Air Station Kai Tak (HMS Nabcatcher), Hong Kong, (1 October - 4 November 1946)
- HMS Glory (4 - 18 November 1946)
- Royal Naval Air Station Sembawang (HMS Nabrock), Singapore, (18 November - 9 December 1946)
- HMS Glory (9 - 19 December 1946)
- Royal Naval Air Station Kai Tak (HMS Nabcatcher), Hong Kong, (19 December 1946 - 14 February 1947)
- HMS Glory (14 - 27 February 1947)
- Royal Naval Air Station Trincomalee (HMS Bambara), Ceylon, (27 February - 15 April 1947)
- HMS Glory (15 April - 17 May 1947)
  - Royal Naval Air Station Trincomalee (HMS Bambara), Ceylon, (Detachment seven aircraft 30 April - 12 May 1947)
- Royal Naval Air Station Sembawang (HMS Nabrock), Singapore, (17 May - 19 June 1947)
- HMS Glory (19 June - 6 October 1947)
- disbanded UK - (6 October 1947)

== Commanding officers ==
List of commanding officers of 837 Naval Air Squadron:

1942 -1943

- Lieutenant A.S. Whitworth, DSC, RN, from 15 March 1942
- disbanded - 15 June 1943

1944 - 1947

- Lieutenant Commander(A) R.B. Martin, RNVR, from 1 August 1944
- Lieutenant Commander(A) W. Siddall-Simpson, DSC, RNVR, from 14 December 1945
- Lieutenant Commander G.H. Bates, MBE, RN, from 25 January 1946 (KiFA 7 March 1947)
- Lieutenant Commander R.H. Hain, RN, from 8 March 1947
- disbanded - 6 October 1947

Note: Abbreviation (A) signifies Air Branch of the RN or RNVR.
