= 770 Naval Air Squadron =

Inactive flying squadron of the Royal Navy's Fleet Air Arm

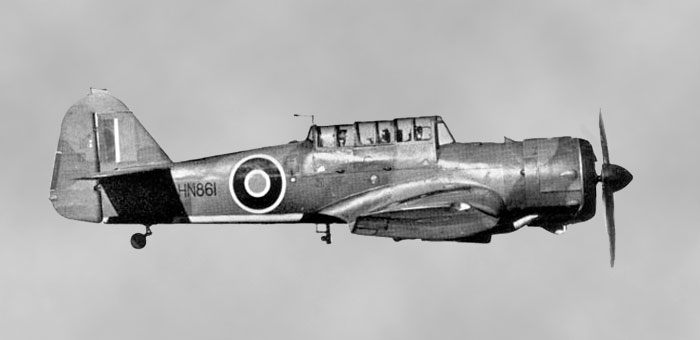
- Miles Martinet TT Mk.1, an example of the type used by 770 NAS
- Active: 1939–1940; 1941–1945
- Disbanded: 1 October 1945
- Country: United Kingdom
- Branch: Royal Navy
- Type: Fleet Air Arm Second Line Squadron
- Role: Deck Landing Training Squadron; Fleet Requirements Unit
- Size: Squadron
- Part of: Fleet Air Arm
- Home station: See Naval air stations section for full list.
- Mottos: In alto societas (Latin for 'There's company aloft')
- Aircraft: See Aircraft operated section for full list.

Insignia
- Squadron Badge Description: Blue, upon clouds melting white a cock proper. Wartime unofficial, badge and motto transferred to 790 Naval Air Squadron
- Identification Markings: individual letters (all types 1941-1942); C8A+ (all types 1943-1944); B8A+ then D8A+ (all types from 1944-1945)

770 Naval Air Squadron (770 NAS) was a Fleet Air Arm (FAA) naval air squadron of the United Kingdom’s Royal Navy (RN). It last disbanded at HMS Nighthawk, RNAS Drem in October 1945. 770 Naval Air Squadron initially formed as a Deck Landing Training Squadron at HMS Daedalus, RNAS Lee-on-Solent, in November 1939. Embarked in HMS Argus, and operated from the aircraft carrier and Hyeres la Palyvestre in the south of France, until it disbanded in May 1940. It reformed at HMS Merlin, RNAS Donibristle, on New Year’s Day 1941, as a Fleet Requirements Unit out of 771 Naval Air Squadron’s 'X' Flight. It moved to HMS Jackdaw, RNAS Crail, in June 1941, then two and half years later it moved to HMS Jackdaw II, RNAS Dunino in January 1944, before finally moving to HMS Nighthawk in July.

== History ==
=== Deck Landing Training (1939–1940) ===
770 Naval Air Squadron formed at RNAS Lee-on-Solent (HMS Daedalus), Hampshire, on 7 November 1939 as a Deck Landing Training squadron. It was initially equipped with two Blackburn Skua, a British two-seat carrier-based dive bomber and fighter aircraft, two Gloster Sea Gladiator, a British biplane fighter aircraft, a de Havilland Moth, a two-seat biplane trainer aircraft and later on two Fairey Swordfish, a British biplane torpedo bomber. The squadron embarked in the converted ocean liner to aircraft carrier HMS Argus, and operated from this ship and Hyeres la Palyvestre, near Toulon, France, where the Royal Navy had a Lodger facility with the French Navy, until it disbanded on 1 May 1940.

=== Fleet Requirements Unit (1941–1944) ===
770 Naval Air Squadron reformed as a Fleet Requirements Unit at RNAS Donibristle (HMS Merlin), Fife, Scotland, on 1 January 1941, out of 771 Naval Air Squadron’s 'X' Flight. It was equipped with four Blackburn Roc, a naval turret fighter aircraft, with two aircraft used for target towing and two used for marking the fall of shot. The squadron relocated to RNAS Crail (HMS Jackdaw), Fife, on 1 June 1941, where it acquired Blackburn Skua aircraft. In 1942 it received the target tug variant of the Boulton Paul Defiant turret fighter and Vought Chesapeake, an American carrier-based dive bomber but the following year the dedicated target tug aircraft, Miles Martinet TT.Mk I, replaced the Boulton Paul Defiant.

On 29 January 1944 the squadron moved to RNAS Dunino (HMS Jackdaw II), in Fife. During the spring Bristol Blenheim Mk.IV, a British light bomber arrived and in the middle of the year the Vought Chesapeake were withdrawn and replaced with Hawker Hurricane Mk IIC, a single-seat fighter aircraft. On 27 July it relocated to RNAS Drem (HMS Nighthawk), East Lothian, Scotland. During 1945, a variety of aircraft was operated. It received Supermarine Seafire Mk IIc, a navalised Supermarine Spitfire fighter aircraft. It also used de Havilland Mosquito B Mk.25 and PR Mk.XVI, the former an improved Canadian version of the Mosquito B Mk.IV bomber aircraft and the latter a photo-reconnaissance variant, and operating out of RAF Charterhall, Scottish Borders. 770 Naval Air Squadron was disbanded into 772 Naval Air Squadron, at RNAS Drem, on 1 October 1945.

== Aircraft operated ==
The squadron operated a variety of different aircraft and versions:

- Gloster Sea Gladiator fighter aircraft (November 1939 - April 1940)
- de Havilland DH.60M Moth trainer aircraft (November 1939 - April 1940)
- Blackburn Skua dive bomber and fighter aircraft (November 1939 - April 1940, October 1941 - December 1943)
- Fairey Swordfish I torpedo bomber (December 1939 - April 1940)
- Blackburn Roc fighter aircraft (January 1941 - December 1943)
- Percival Proctor II radio trainer (December 1941 - May 1942)
- Vought Chesapeake dive bomber (May 1942 - June 1944)
- Boulton Paul Defiant TT Mk I target tug (August 1942 - August 1943)
- de Havilland Tiger Moth trainer aircraft (August - September 1943)
- Supermarine Seafire L Mk IIc fighter aircraft (September 1943)
- Miles Martinet TT.Mk I target tug (September 1943 - October 1945)
- Bristol Blenheim Mk.IV light bomber (March 1944 - June 1945)
- Hawker Hurricane Mk.IIC fighter aircraft (May 1944 - April 1945)
- de Havilland Mosquito B Mk.25 bomber (July - October 1945)
- Supermarine Seafire F Mk IIc fighter aircraft (July - October 1945)
- de Havilland Mosquito PR Mk.XVI photo-reconnaissance aircraft (September - October 1945)

== Naval air stations ==
770 Naval Air Squadron operated from a number of naval air station of the Royal Navy, in the United Kingdom, a Royal Navy aircraft carrier and a number of Royal Air Force stations:

1939 - 1940

- Royal Naval Air Station Lee-on-Solent (HMS Daedalus), Hampshire, (7 November 1939 - 13 November 1939)
  - HMS Argus (Detachment 9 - 13 November 1939)
- HMS Argus (13 November 1939 - 21 November 1939)
- HMS Argus/Hyères la Palyvestre, France, (21 November 1939 - 1 May 1940)
- disbanded - (1 May 1940)

1941 - 1945

- Royal Naval Air Station Donibristle (HMS Merlin), Fife, (1 January 1941 - 1 June 1941)
- Royal Naval Air Station Crail (HMS Jackdaw), Fife, (1 June 1941 - 29 January 1944)
  - Royal Air Force Evanton, Ross and Cromarty, (Detachment 7 December 1943 - 1 May 1944)
- Royal Naval Air Station Dunino (HMS Jackdaw II), Fife, (29 January 1944 - 25 July 1944)
- Royal Naval Air Station Drem (HMS Nighthawk), East Lothian, (25 July 1944 - 1 October 1945)
  - Royal Air Force Ouston, Northumberland, (Detachment 19 - 23 April 1945)
  - Royal Naval Air Station Ayr (HMS Wagtail), South Ayrshire, (Detachment 30 June 1945)
  - Royal Air Force Charterhall, Scottish Borders, (Mosquito Flight) (1 July - 1 October 1945)
  - Royal Naval Air Station Arbroath (HMS Condor), Angus, (Detachment 3 - 14 September 1945)
- disbanded - (1 October 1945)

== Commanding officers ==
List of commanding officers of 770 Naval Air Squadron with date of appointment:

1939 - 1940

- not identified

1941 - 1945

- Lieutenant E.W. Lawson, RN, from 1 January 1941
- Lieutenant H.E.R. Torin, RN, from 5 May 1941
- Lieutenant Commander(A) W.H.C. Blake, RN, from 29 October 1941
- Lieutenant Commander(A) H.T. Molyneaux, RNVR, from 13 November 1941
- Lieutenant Commander(A) A.F.E. Payen, RNVR, from 4 April 1942
- Lieutenant Commander(A) D.R.M. Manthorpe, RNVR, from 5 April 1944
- Lieutenant Commander(A) J.M.L. Wilson, RNZNVR, from 13 August 1945
- disbanded - 1 October 1945

Note: Abbreviation (A) signifies Air Branch of the RN or RNVR.
