= 737 Naval Air Squadron =

Inactive flying squadron of the Royal Navy's Fleet Air Arm

- Squadron badge
- Active: 1943; 1944–1945; 1949–1957; 1959–1983
- Disbanded: 7 February 1983
- Country: United Kingdom
- Branch: Royal Navy
- Type: Fleet Air Arm Second Line Squadron
- Role: Amphibious Bomber Reconnaissance Training Squadron; ASV Training Unit; Naval Anti-Submarine School; Anti-Submarine Operational Flying School
- Size: Squadron
- Part of: Fleet Air Arm: 53rd Training Air Group (June 1950 - January 1952)
- Last Naval Air Station: RNAS Portland (HMS Osprey)
- Motto: Purposeful
- Aircraft: See Aircraft operated section for full list.
- Engagements: Falklands War
- Battle honours: Falkland Islands 1982

Commanders
- Notable commanders: Commander Ronald Leonard, MBE, DFC, AFC, RN

Insignia
- Squadron Badge Description: Barry wavy of eight white and blue, a foil point in base proper the blade winged gold (1952)
- Identification Markings: D1A+ (Walrus); K4A+ (Swordfish/Anson from March 1944) to A2+ (August 1944); 100-119 (Seafire); 200-231 (Firefly); 400-434 (Gannet) (from March 1949 to January 1956); 617-627 (Gannet) (from January 1956 to November 1957); 760-789 (Whirlwind); 770-776 (Wessex); 520-529 (Wessex July 1965); 434-437, 520-528 (Wessex August 1968); 524-529 (Sea King); 650-646 (Wessex); 660-665 (Sea King April 1973); 400-407/ships ID letters (Ships’ Flights June 1970)
- Tail Codes: GN (1949 – 1957); PO (1962 – 1983)

737 Naval Air Squadron (737 NAS) was a Fleet Air Arm (FAA) naval air squadron of the United Kingdom’s Royal Navy (RN). It was initially active during 1943 as an amphibious Bomber Reconnaissance Training Squadron. Reactivated in 1944 it operated as an ASV Training Unit until 1945. It was active again between 1949 and 1957. From 1959 it was the Anti-Submarine Warfare school at RNAS Portland. It operated Westland Wessex HAS.3 rescue helicopters from their land base at RNAS Portland, Dorset.

== History ==
=== Amphibious Bomber Reconnaissance Training Squadron (1943) ===
737 Naval Air Squadron initially formed at RNAS Dunino (HMS Jackdaw II), Fife, Scotland, on 22 February 1943 as an Amphibious Bomber Reconnaissance training squadron. It was equipped with Supermarine Walrus, an amphibious maritime patrol aircraft. However, the need for catapult-launched amphibious aircraft significantly decreased and after seven months of operation the squadron disbanded, on 28 September 1943.

=== ASV Training Unit (1944 – 1945) ===
The squadron then reformed as an air-to-surface-vessel radar (ASV radar) Training Unit at RNAS Inskip (HMS Nightjar), Lancashire, England, on 15 March 1944. It was equipped with Fairey Swordfish Mk II, a biplane torpedo bomber, and Avro Anson Mk I, a multi-role training aircraft, these particular aircraft being fitted out as flying classrooms. The squadron's role was to train aircrew for anti-shipping work using ASV Mark X and Mark XI radar.

737 Naval Air Squadron moved to RNAS Arbroath (HMS Condor), Angus, Scotland, on 28 August 1944, with its Fairy Swordfish and Avro Anson aircraft. The squadron remained at RNAS Arbroath for around eight months before moving south to RNAS Burscough (HMS Ringtail), Lancashire, on 15 April 1945. Here, in August 1945 it received Fairey Barracuda, a British carrier-borne torpedo and dive bomber, however, 737 Naval Air Squadron disbanded into 735 Naval Air Squadron in November 1945.

=== Naval Anti-Submarine School (1949 - 1957) ===
737 Naval Air Squadron reformed at RNAS Eglinton (HMS Gannet), County Londonderry, Northern Ireland, on 30 March 1949. It provided Part II of the Operational Flying School Course and training included air weapon use, basic anti-submarine warfare and deck landing. The squadron was equipped with Supermarine Seafire, a navalised version of the Supermarine Spitfire fighter aircraft, and Fairey Firefly, a carrier-borne fighter and anti-submarine aircraft.

In April 1950 the squadrons Supermarine Seafire aircraft were transferred to 738 Naval Air Squadron, and 737 Naval Air Squadron was then the foundation for the Naval Anti-Submarine School (NASS). Also that same month, an ‘X’ Flight was formed at RNAS Lee-on-Solent (HMS Daedalus), Hampshire, England, for trials with search receivers to detect submarine radar. This unit was equipped with a Fairey Firefly and an Avro Anson, and after spending some time at RN Air Section Gibraltar, at RAF North Front, Gibraltar, it returned to RNAS Lee-on-Solent. It moved to RNAS Eglinton in June 1951, and during the month of July in 1951 the ‘X’ Flight was involved in a trial around the suitability of the British Radio Directional Sonobuoy Mk 1 for Fleet Air Arm aircraft. The flight became 744 Naval Air Squadron in the same month.

In June 1950, 737 Naval Air Squadron became administered by the 53rd Training Air Group, alongside 719 Naval Air Squadron, which was also now part of the NASS. 1955 saw the withdrawal of the Fairey Firefly aircraft, which were replaced by Fairey Gannet, a carrier-borne anti-submarine warfare aircraft. On 22 November 1957, the squadron disbanded at RNAS Eglinton, into 719 Naval Air Squadron.

=== Anti-Submarine Operational Flying School (1959 - 1983) ===
737 Naval Air Squadron reformed again on 28 August 1959 at RNAS Portland (HMS Osprey), Portland, as the Royal Navy Anti-Submarine Warfare School acquiring Westland Whirlwind HAR.3, a British licence-built version of the United States Sikorsky H-19 Chickasaw, from the remains of 815 Naval Air Squadron which disbanded. It then took on Westland Whirlwind HAS.7 roughly 1 month later. A couple of Westland Whirlwind HAS.22 were added to strength in February 1960, whilst an anti-submarine variant these being used for search and rescue duties until July 1961, when they were transferred to a reformed 771 Naval Air Squadron.

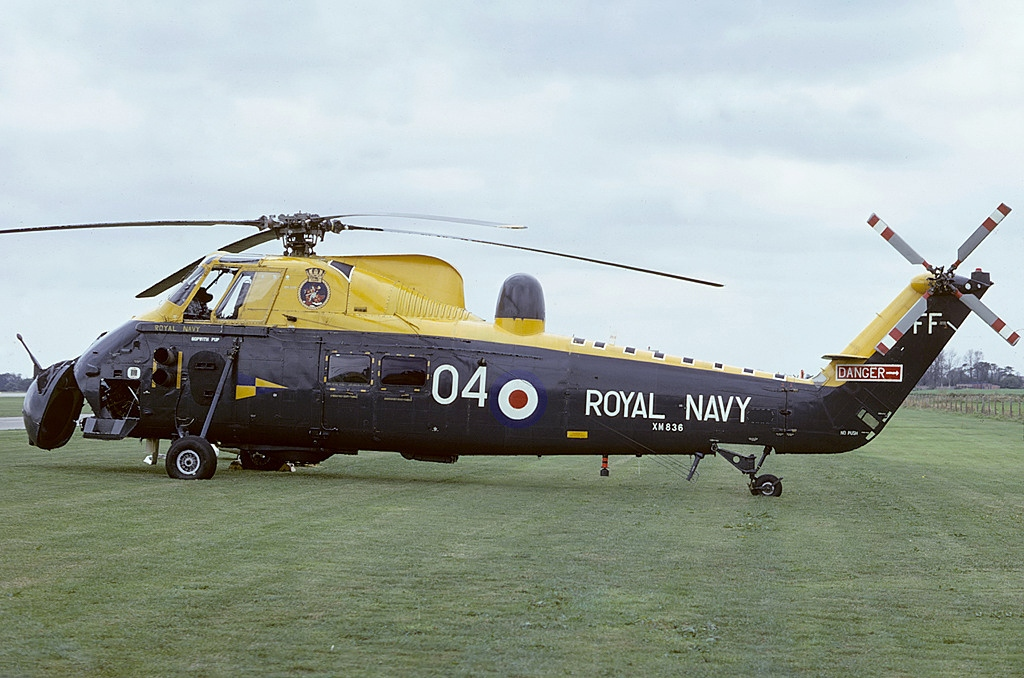
XM836, Westland Wessex HAS.3, 737 Naval Air Squadron

From July 1962 the squadron converted to Westland Wessex, a development of the Sikorsky H-34 produced under licence by Westland, initially the HAS.1 variant, a utility and anti-submarine warfare helicopter, and then in October 1967 it took on deliveries of Westland Wessex HAS.3, an improved anti-submarine version. 737 Naval Air Squadron took over from 829 Naval Air Squadron in June 1970, the responsibility for the Wessex Flights aboard the remaining County-class destroyers During the 'Cod Wars' of 1973 and 1975-76 several of these Flights were deployed aboard Royal Fleet Auxiliary ships.

July 1970 saw the squadron take the Westland Sea King, a British licence-built version of the American Sikorsky SH-3 Sea King helicopter, built by Westland Helicopters, receiving HAS.1, the first anti-submarine version for the Royal Navy. In May 1972, 737 Naval Air Squadron took over Anti-Submarine Warfare Operational and Advanced Flying Training, with the squadron regularly detached to the helicopter support ship RFA Engadine, for seaborne training. The Westland Sea King helicopters were later passed over to 826 Naval Air Squadron, in June 1975.

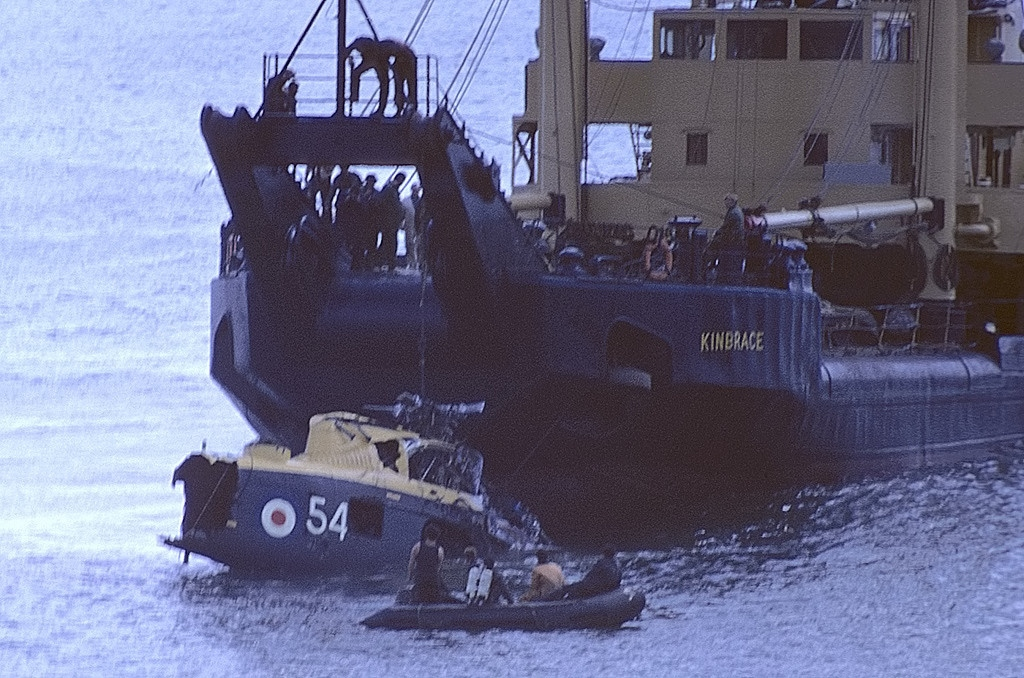
Westland Wessex HAS.3 of 737 Naval Air Squadron. Seen here being lifted from the ocean by the salvage vessel RFA Kinbrace following its crash on 15 July 1974 while on approach to RNAS Portland

737 Naval Air Squadron then concentrated on Westland Wessex HAS.3 operational training duties, as well as conversion and refresher training. It was planned to have disbanded during the summer of 1982, however, its helicopters were required for use in the two County-class destroyers serving with the Falklands Task Force and the squadron continued in existence, adding Westland Sea King HAS.2 on loan from 706 and 814 Naval Air Squadrons. On the 7 February 1983, 737 Naval Air Squadron disbanded at RNAS Portland (HMS Osprey) and handed its Westland Wessex HAS.3 to 772 Naval Air Squadron, with the training task being transferred to the 810 Naval Air Squadron at RNAS Culdrose (HMS Seahawk).

== Helicopter-only squadron ==
From 28 August 1959 the squadron only used helicopters.

737 NAS was assigned to operate from Helicopter Support Ship RFA Engadine and later, from the flight decks of the eight County Class guided missile destroyers, including HMS Glamorgan (D19), HMS Antrim (D18) and HMS Norfolk (D21). 737 Squadron supported flights on these destroyers in addition to providing aircrew training at RNAS Portland.

In their ship-borne, anti-submarine role, the HAS.3s could carry two Mark 44 torpedoes or Mark 46 torpedoes (with parachutes) or four Mk.11 Depth Charges in addition to their Plessey dipping Sonar. They could also be fitted with a door-mounted Machine gun and act as a self-contained unit, handling all operations of Anti-submarine warfare(ASW).

Throughout the late 1970s most of the Wessex HAS.3 helicopters at RNAS Portland were being replaced by Westland Sea Kings, which could carry more torpedoes or depth charges and had the security of twin engines, with greatly extended endurance.

=== Falklands War ===
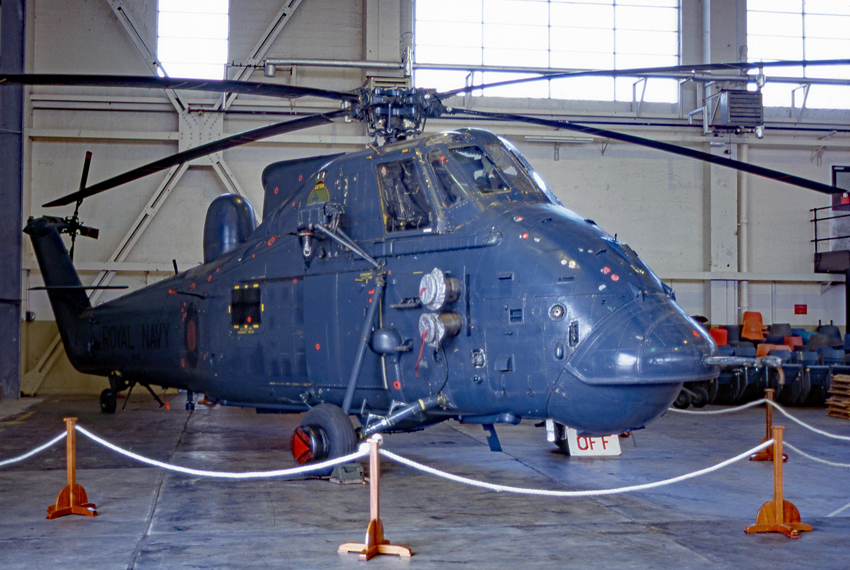
XP142 Humphrey, Westland Wessex HAS.3 from HMS Antrim

HMS Antrim (D18) was the Flagship of Operation Paraquet, the recovery of South Georgia in April 1982. Her helicopter, Westland Wessex HAS.3 XP142, nicknamed Humphrey, was responsible for the rescue of 16 SAS men from Fortuna Glacier and the subsequent detection and disabling of the Argentine submarine Santa Fe. Another HAS.3, XM837, was lost in June 1982 when an Exocet missile hit the hangar on the destroyer HMS Glamorgan (D19). A few HAS.3s remained in service after the Falklands War period. One of these, XP142, was seriously damaged near San Carlos Water and was replaced on HMS Antrim by XM328 in November 1982. XM328 then sailed with HMS Antrim on her second deployment to the South Atlantic.

== Decommissioning ==
- Westland Wessex HAS.3 - XM328 was transferred to 772 Naval Air Squadron when 737 Naval Air Squadron disbanded on 4 February 1983. Now preserved at The Helicopter Museum, Weston-super-Mare.
- XP142 is preserved in the Fleet Air Arm Museum at Yeovilton.

== Aircraft operated ==
The squadron operated a variety of different aircraft and versions:

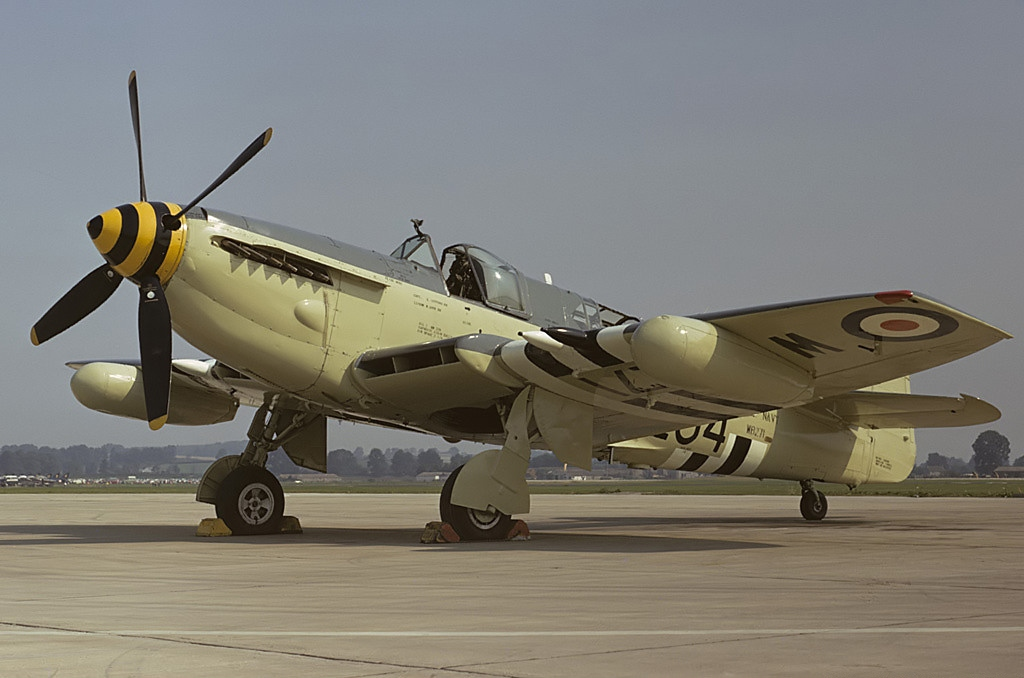
Fairey Firefly AS.Mk 5

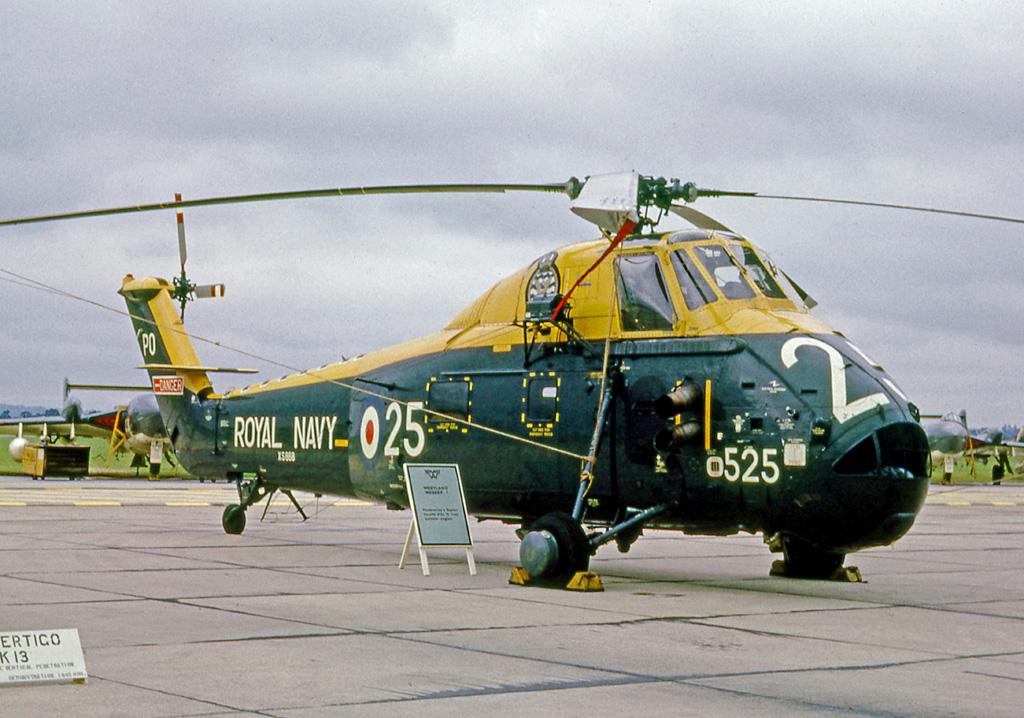
Westland Wessex HAS.1

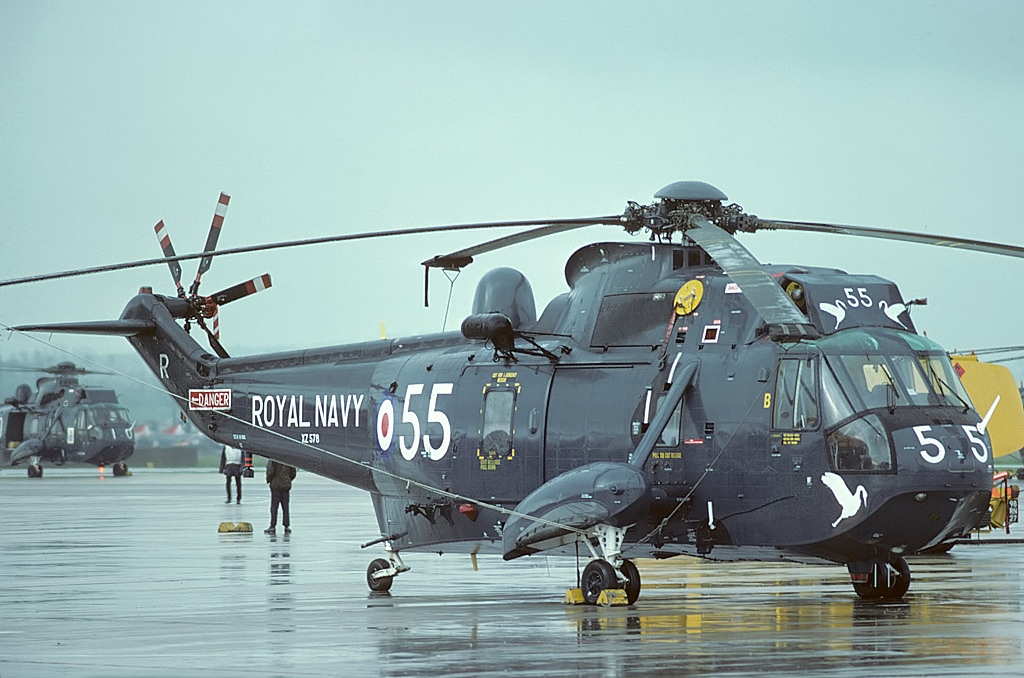
Westland Sea King HAS.2

- Supermarine Walrus amphibious maritime patrol aircraft (February - September 1943)
- Fairey Swordfish II torpedo bomber (March 1944 - July 1945)
- Avro Anson Mk.I multi-role training aircraft (June 1944 - September 1945)
- Fairey Barracuda Mk III torpedo and dive bomber (August - December 1945)
- Supermarine Seafire F Mk XV fighter aircraft (April 1949 - January 1950)
- Fairey Firefly FR.I fighter/reconnaissance aircraft (April 1949 - March 1950)
- Supermarine Seafire F Mk XVII fighter aircraft (April 1949 - May 1950)
- Fairey Firefly T.Mk 1 training aircraft (April 1949 - November 1952)
- Fairey Firefly FR.Mk 4 fighter/reconnaissance aircraft (April 1949 - August 1953)
- Fairey Firefly AS.Mk 5 anti-submarine aircraft (April 1949 - May 1955)
- Fairey Firefly T.Mk 2 training aircraft (April 1949 - June 1955)
- Fairey Firefly AS.Mk 6 anti-submarine aircraft (May 1954 - June 1955)
- Fairey Gannet AS.1 anti-submarine aircraft (March 1955 - November 1957)
- Fairey Gannet T.2 trainer version of AS.1 (March 1955 - November 1957)
- Westland Whirlwind HAR.3 search and rescue helicopter (August 1959 - December 1960)
- Westland Whirlwind HAS.7 anti-submarine helicopter (September 1959 - August 1962)
- Westland Whirlwind HAS.22 anti-submarine helicopter (February 1960 - July 1961)
- Westland Wessex HAS.3 anti-submarine helicopter (March 1967 - December 1982)
- Westland Wessex HAS.1 anti-submarine helicopter (July 1962 - May 1978)
- Westland Sea King HAS.1 anti-submarine helicopter (July 1970 - December 1975)
- Westland Sea King HAS.2 anti-submarine helicopter (March 1982 - February 1983)

=== 737X Flight ===
- Avro Anson Mk.I multi-role training aircraft (April 1950 - July 1951)
- Fairey Barracuda TR.III torpedo-reconnaissance aircraft (June - July 1951)
- Fairey Firefly Mk 5 fighter and anti-submarine aircraft (April 1950 - January 1951)
- Fairey Firefly AS.Mk 6 anti-submarine aircraft (January - July 1951)

== Battle honours ==
The battle honours awarded to 737 Naval Air Squadron are:

- Falkland Islands 1982

== Naval air stations and ships ==
737 Naval Air Squadron operated from a number of naval air stations of the Royal Navy in the United Kingdom, a Royal Navy aircraft carrier and landing ship, and a Royal Fleet Auxiliary helicopter support ship:

1943

- Royal Naval Air Station Dunino (HMS Jackdaw II), Fife, (22 February 1943 - 28 September 1943)
- disbanded - (28 September 1943)

1944 - 1945

- Royal Naval Air Station Inskip (HMS Nightjar), Lancashire, (15 March 1944 - 28 August 1944)
- Royal Naval Air Station Arbroath (HMS Condor), Angus, (28 August 1944 - 15 April 1945)
- Royal Naval Air Station Burscough (HMS Ringtail), Lancashire, (15 April 1945 - 12 November 1945)
- disbanded - (12 November 1945)

1949 - 1957

- Royal Naval Air Station Eglinton (HMS Gannet), County Londonderry, (30 March 1949 - 6 May 1949)
- Royal Naval Air Station Ballykelly (HMS Sealion), County Londonderry, (6 May 1957 - 2 November 1957)
- Royal Naval Air Station Eglinton (HMS Gannet), County Londonderry, (2 November 1957 - 22 November 1957)
- disbanded - (22 November 1957)

1959 - 1983

- Royal Naval Air Station Portland (HMS Osprey), Dorset, (28 August 1959 - 7 February 1983)
  - HMS Hermes (Detachment five helicopters 28 November - 11 December 1963)
  - HMS Lofoten (Detachments 1966–67)
  - RFA Engadine (Detachments March 1968 - October 1982)
  - HMS Hermes (Detachment four helicopters 24 November - 6 December 1982)
- disbanded - (7 February 1983)

=== 737X Flight ===
- Royal Naval Air Station Lee-On-Solent (HMS Daedalus), Hampshire, (19 April 1950 - 27 January 1951)
- HMS Indefatigable (27 January 1951 - 7 February 1951)
- RN Air Section Gibraltar, Gibraltar, (7 February 1951 - 25 April 1951)
- Royal Naval Air Station Lee-on-Solent (HMS Daedalus), Hampshire, (25 April 1951 - 11 June 1951)
- Royal Naval Air Station Eglinton (HMS Gannet), County Londonderry, (11 June 1951 - 20 July 1951)
- became 744 Naval Air Squadron 20 July 1951

== Ships’ Flights ==
737 Naval Air Squadron operated a number of ships’ flights for a number of County-class destroyers between 1970 and 1982:

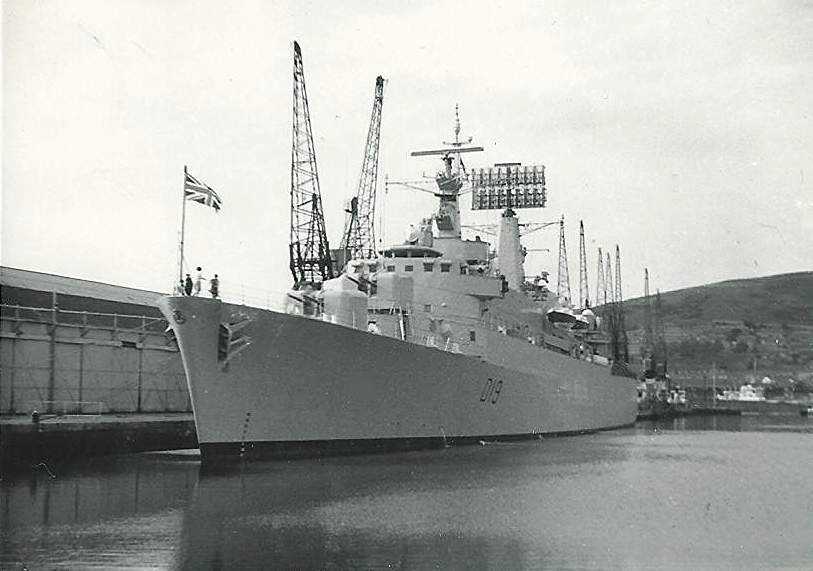
County-class destroyer HMS Glamorgan

- HMS Antrim (1970 - 1982)
- HMS Devonshire (1971 - 1978)
- HMS Fife (1970 - 1980)
- HMS Glamorgan (1970 - 1978) / (1981 - 1982)
- HMS Hampshire (1973 - 1976)
- HMS Kent (1972 - 1980)
- HMS London (1970 - 1972) / (1975 - 1980)
- HMS Norfolk (1970 - 1980)

== Commanding officers ==
List of commanding officers of 737 Naval Air Squadron:

1943

- Lieutenant(A) J.R. Dimsdale, RNVR, from 22 February 1943
- disbanded - 28 September 1943

1944 - 1945

- Lieutenant Commander(A) L.P. Dunne, RNVR, from 15 March 1944
- Lieutenant Commander(A) G.J. Staveley, RNVR, from 9 November 1944
- Lieutenant Commander F.V. Jones, DSC, RNVR, from 5 March 1945
- disbanded - 12 November 1945

1949 - 1957

- Lieutenant J.L. Appleby, RN, from 30 March 1949
- Lieutenant Commander W.C. Simpson, DSC, RN, from 10 May 1949
- Lieutenant Commander A. Turnbull, RN, from 15 December 1949
- Lieutenant Commander L.G. Morris, RN, from 14 June 1950
- Lieutenant Commander J.L.W. Thompson, RN, from 31 January 1952
- Lieutenant Commander J.D. Honywill, RN, from 29 July 1953
- Lieutenant Commander D.W. Pennick, RN, from 6 January 1955
- Lieutenant Commander R.D.R. Hawkesworth, DSC, RN, from 3 March 1956
- disbanded - 22 November 1957

1959 - 1983

- Lieutenant Commander H.M.A. Hayes, RN, from 28 August 1959
- Lieutenant Commander G.F. Stride, RN, from 15 February 1960
- Lieutenant Commander P.E. Bailey, RN, from 8 August 1961
- Lieutenant Commander R. Leonard, MBE, DFC, AFC, RN, 11 April 1963
- Lieutenant Commander T.M.B. Seymour, RN, from 30 November 1964
- Lieutenant Commander M.G.W. White, RN, 4 October 1965
- Lieutenant Commander A.G. Claridge, RN, from 28 July 1967
- Lieutenant Commander M.J. Holmes, RN, from 11 December 1968
- Lieutenant Commander K.F. Harding, RN, from 15 December 1970
- Lieutenant Commander J.M. Neville-Rolfe, RN, from 9 August 1972
- Lieutenant Commander G.P. Stock, RN, from 18 April 1975
- Lieutenant Commander M. Fitzgerald, RN, from 19 December 1975
- Lieutenant Commander A.N. Law, RN, from 5 December 1977
- Lieutenant Commander C.R. Green, RN, from 4 June 1979
- Lieutenant Commander A.B. Gough, RN, from 11 September 1980
- Lieutenant Commander M.S. Tennant, RN, from 18 December 1981
- disbanded - 7 February 1983

Note: Abbreviation (A) signifies Air Branch of the RN or RNVR.
