= 785 Naval Air Squadron =

Inactive flying squadron of the Royal Navy's Fleet Air Arm

- Squadron badge
- Active: 1940–1946
- Disbanded: 1 March 1946
- Country: United Kingdom
- Branch: Royal Navy
- Type: Fleet Air Arm Second Line Squadron
- Role: Torpedo Bomber Reconnaissance Training Squadron
- Size: Squadron
- Part of: Fleet Air Arm
- Home station: RNAS Crail
- Aircraft: See Aircraft flown section for full list.

Insignia
- Squadron Badge Description: White, a jackdaw rising grasping in his claws a torpedo proper (warhead red) (1943)
- Identification Markings: individual numbers (Swordfish/Albacore); A-Q & AA-EE (Swordfish later); R-Z & RE-ZZ (Albacore later); C1A+ to C5A+ (all types 1943 - 1946)

785 Naval Air Squadron (785 NAS), also called 785 Squadron, is an inactive Fleet Air Arm (FAA) naval air squadron of the United Kingdom’s Royal Navy (RN). It was formed as a Torpedo Bomber Reconnaissance Training Squadron, at RNAS Crail, Fife, in November 1940 and disbanded in early 1946. Throughout its existence it operated a number of various types of torpedo bomber aircraft, lastly flying Grumman Avenger GR.I and Fairey Barracuda TR III. The squadron became part of No. 1 Naval Operational Training Unit in late 1944.

== History ==
=== Torpedo Bomber Reconnaissance Training Squadron (1940–1946) ===
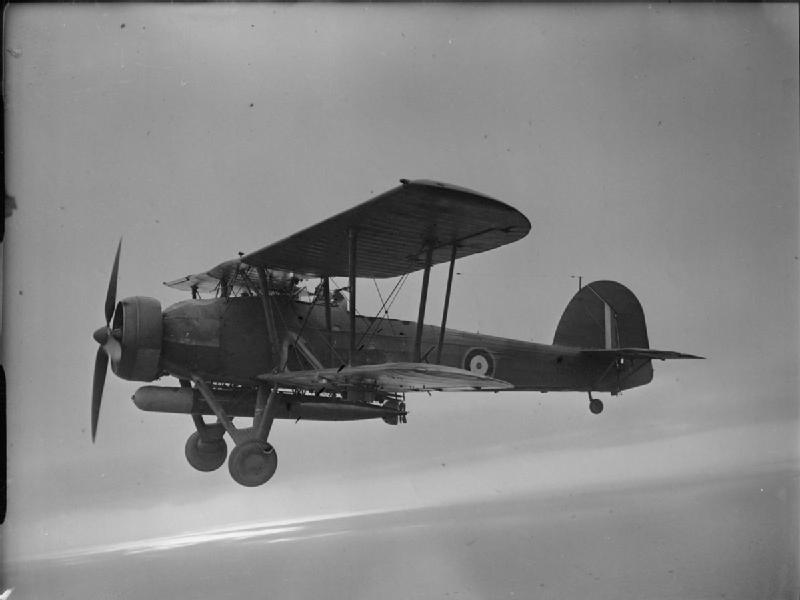
A Fairey Swordfish of 785 NAS in flight

785 Naval Air Squadron formed as a Torpedo Bomber Reconnaissance training squadron at RNAS Crail (HMS Jackdaw), in Fife, Scotland, on 4 November 1940, out of the naval element of the Torpedo Training Unit RAF, from RAF Abbotsinch, in Renfrewshire.

The squadron was initially equipped with Blackburn Shark, a carrier-borne biplane torpedo bomber and Fairey Swordfish, a biplane torpedo bomber. August 1941 saw the withdrawal of the Blackburn Shark aircraft and these were replaced with Fairey Albacore, a biplane torpedo bomber. In December 1942 the squadron started to receive Fairey Barracuda, a carrier-borne torpedo and dive bomber and by late 1943, it was providing an anti-submarine warfare course, alongside a Fairey Barracuda familiarisation course.

By the end of 1944, 785 NAS had become part of No.1 Naval Operational Training Unit and midway through the following year it started to introduce Grumman Avenger, an American torpedo bomber, on 31 July 1945 when 736 Naval Air Squadron was absorbed. Later, the squadron also absorbed 711 and 786 Naval Air Squadrons, during December. 785 Naval Air Squadron disbanded on 1 March 1946.

== Aircraft flown ==
The squadron operated a number of different aircraft types, including:

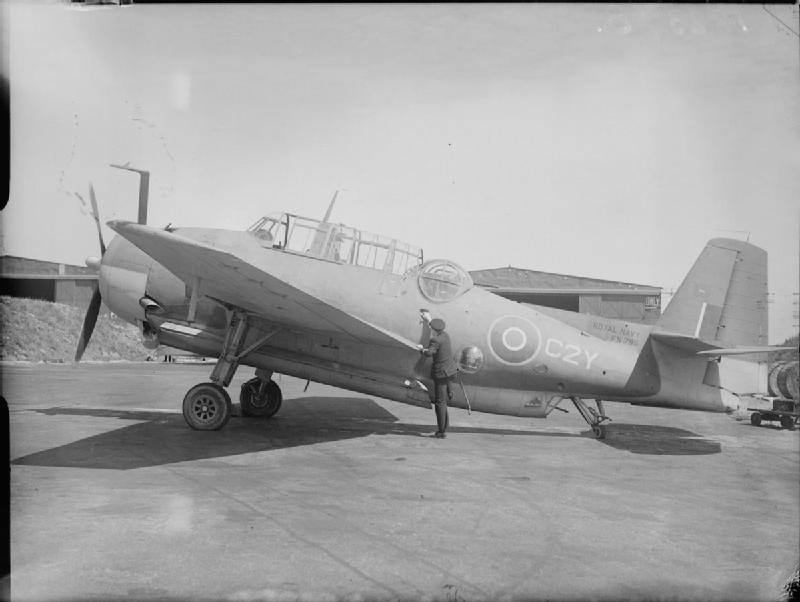
A Grumman Avenger of 785 Naval Air Squadron at RNAS Crail

- Blackburn Shark II torpedo-spotter-reconnaissance aircraft (November 1940 - April 1941)
- Fairey Swordfish I torpedo bomber (November 1940 - May 1944)
- Fairey Albacore torpedo bomber (August 1941 - November 1943)
- Fairey Swordfish II torpedo bomber (April 1942 - February 1944)
- Fairey Barracuda Mk I torpedo and dive bomber (November 1942 - January 1944)
- Fairey Barracuda Mk II torpedo and dive bomber (April 1943 - February 1946)
- Miles Master I advanced trainer (May 1943 - January 1944)
- Grumman Avenger I torpedo bomber (August 1945 - February 1946)
- Avro Anson Mk I multirole aircraft (November 1945 - February 1946)
- Fairey Barracuda TR III torpedo and dive bomber (January - February 1946)

== Naval air stations ==
785 Naval Air Squadron operated from a single naval air station of the Royal Navy, in Scotland:

- Royal Naval Air Station Crail (HMS Jackdaw), Fife, (4 November 1940 - 1 March 1946)
  - (satellite Royal Naval Air Station Dunino (HMS Jackdaw II)), Fife, (4 November 1940 - 1 March 1946)
- disbanded - (1 March 1946)

== Commanding officers ==
List of commanding officers of 785 Naval Air Squadron, with date of appointment:

- Lieutenant Commander P.G.O. Sydney-Turner, RN, from 4 November 1940
- Captain O. Patch, DSO, DSC, RM, from 22 August 1941
- Lieutenant R.W. Thorne, RN, from 1 January 1942
- Lieutenant A.H. Abrams, DSC, RN, from 7 September 1942
- Lieutenant J.H. Stenning, RN, from 22 October 1942
- Lieutenant Commander(A) K.G. Sharp, RN, from 2 December 1942
- Lieutenant Commander(A) M. Thorpe, RN, from 1 July 1943
- Lieutenant Commander(A) R.B. Lunberg, RN, from 31 January 1944
- Lieutenant Commander(A) M.W. Rudorf, DSC, RN, from 5 December 1944
- Lieutenant Commander L.C. Watson, DSC, RN, from 13 June 1945
- Lieutenant Commander(A) N.G. Haigh, RNVR, from 31 July 1945
- Lieutenant Commander J.F. Arnold, RN, from 15 December 1945
- disbanded - 1 March 1946

Note: Abbreviation (A) signifies Air Branch of the RN or RNVR.
