= 786 Naval Air Squadron =

Inactive flying squadron of the Royal Navy's Fleet Air Arm

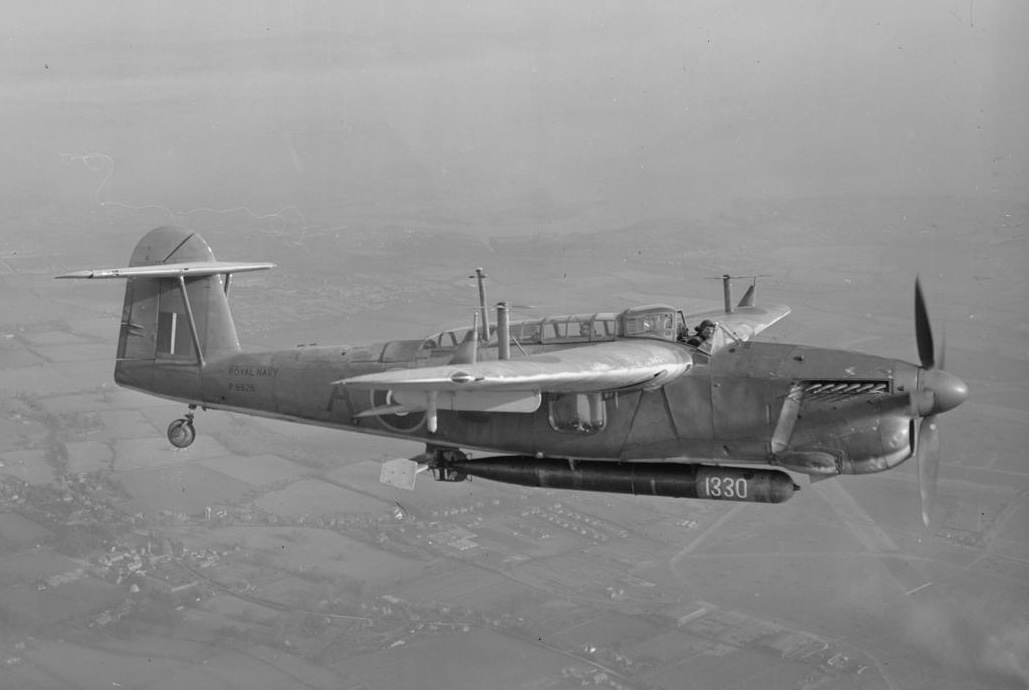
- Fairey Barracuda Mk II; an example of the type used by 786 NAS
- Active: 1940–1945
- Disbanded: 21 December 1945
- Country: United Kingdom
- Branch: Royal Navy
- Type: Fleet Air Arm Second Line Squadron
- Role: Torpedo Bomber Reconnaissance Squadron
- Size: Squadron
- Part of: Fleet Air Arm
- Home station: RNAS Crail

Insignia
- Identification Markings: initially individual letters C1A+ to C7A+ (1943 - 1945)

Aircraft flown
- Attack: Fairey Albacore; Fairey Swordfish; Fairey Barracuda
- Trainer: Avro Anson

786 Naval Air Squadron (786 NAS), also referred to as 786 Squadron, is an inactive Fleet Air Arm (FAA) naval air squadron of the United Kingdom’s Royal Navy (RN). It was last operational between 1940 and 1945, at RNAS Crail, Fife, as a Torpedo Bomber Reconnaissance squadron and flew different types of torpedo bomber aircraft, initially equipped with Fairey Albacore and shortly afterwards Fairey Swordfish, these aircraft were replaced by Fairey Barracuda.

== History ==
=== Torpedo Bomber Reconnaissance Squadron (1940–1945) ===
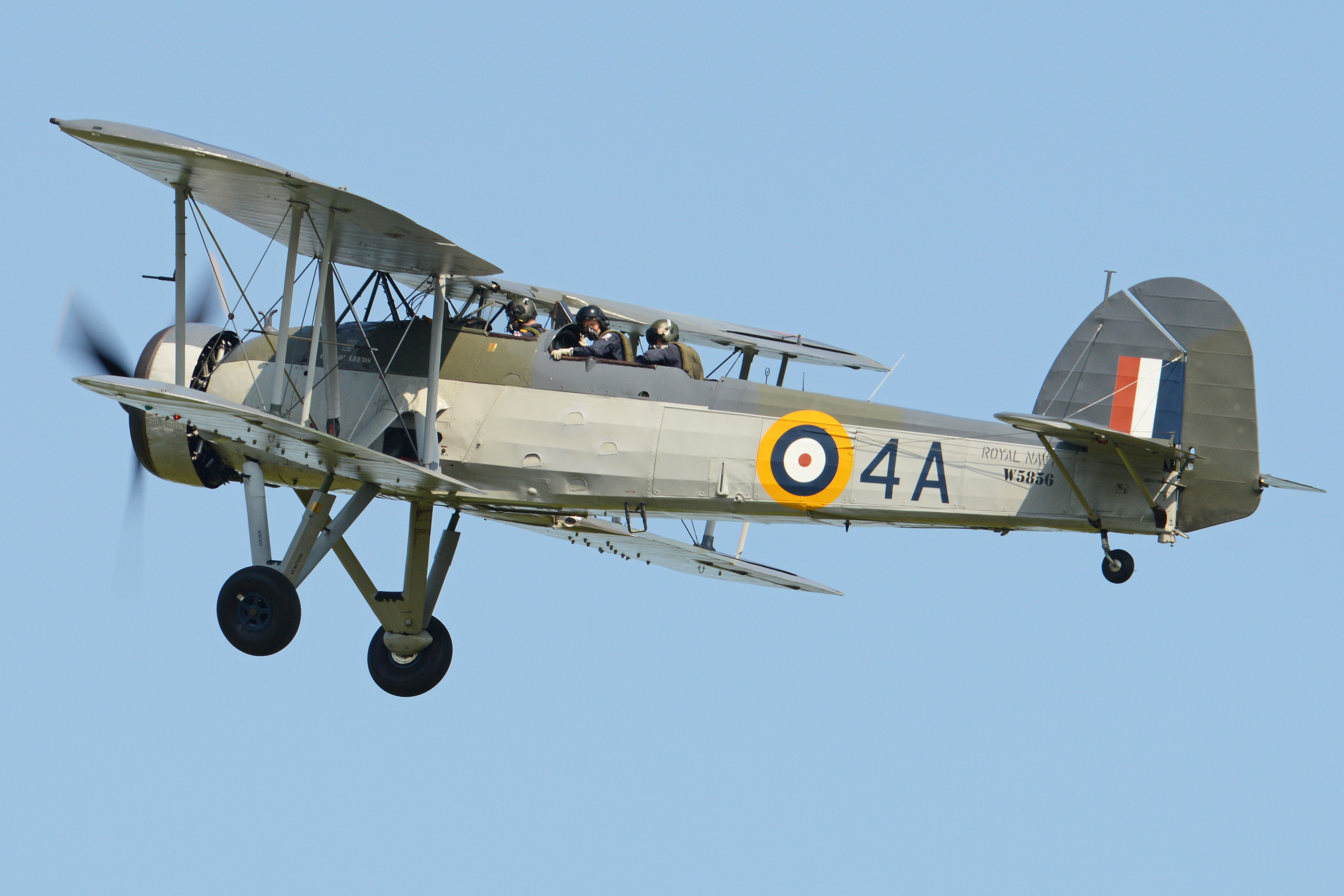
Fairey Swordfish I

786 Naval Air Squadron formed as a Torpedo Bomber Reconnaissance squadron at RNAS Crail (HMS Jackdaw), in Fife, Scotland, on 4 November 1940, out of the naval element of the Torpedo Training Unit RAF, from RAF Abbotsinch, in Renfrewshire. It was initially equipped with nine Fairey Albacore, a British biplane torpedo bomber, which was later augmented with Fairey Swordfish, also a British biplane torpedo bomber. In December 1942 the squadron started to receive Fairey Barracuda, a British carrier-borne torpedo and dive bomber, and over the next month these replaced the Fairey Swordfish and Fairey Albacore aircraft. At the end of summer during 1944 the squadron received a number of Avro Anson, a multirole aircraft, which were fitted out as air-to-surface-vessel (ASV) radar ‘classroom’ trainer aircraft. 786 Naval Air Squadron disbanded into 785 Naval Air Squadron at RNAS Crail (HMS Jackdaw), on 21 December 1945.

== Aircraft flown ==
The squadron operated a number of different aircraft types, including:

- Fairey Albacore torpedo bomber (November 1940 - December 1942)
- Fairey Swordfish I torpedo bomber (May 1941 - December 1942)
- Fairey Swordfish II torpedo bomber (May 1942 - January 1943)
- Fairey Barracuda Mk I torpedo and dive bomber (December 1942 - December 1943)
- Fairey Barracuda Mk II torpedo and dive bomber (December 1943 - December 1945)
- Avro Anson Mk I multirole aircraft (August 1944 - December 1945)

== Naval air stations ==
786 Naval Air Squadron operated from a single naval air station of the Royal Navy, in Scotland:

- Royal Naval Air Station Crail (HMS Jackdaw), Fife
  - (satellite Royal Naval Air Station Dunino (HMS Jackdaw II)), Fife, (4 November 1940 - 21 December 1945)
- disbanded - (21 December 1945)

== Commanding officers ==
List of commanding officers of 786 Naval Air Squadron with date of appointment:

- Captain F.W. Brown, RM, from 6 December 1940
- Lieutenant(A) S. Keane, RN, from 28 July 1941
- Lieutenant R.W. Little, RN, from November 1941
- Lieutenant R.C.B. Stallard-Peyre, RN, from 23 February 1942
- Lieutenant Commander B.E. Boulding, DSC, RN, from 15 October 1942
- Lieutenant Commander D. Norcock, RN, from 10 August 1943
- Lieutenant Commander(A) R.J. Fisher, RNZNVR, from 30 June 1944
- Lieutenant Commander(A) F.H. Franklin, RNVR, from 30 October 1944
- Lieutenant Commander L.C. Watson, DSC, RN, from 13 June 1945
- disbanded - 21 December 1945

Note: Abbreviation (A) signifies Air Branch of the RN or RNVR.
