= 711 Naval Air Squadron =

Inactive flying squadron of the Royal Navy's Fleet Air Arm

711 Naval Air Squadron ~~711 (Catapult) Flight FAA~~
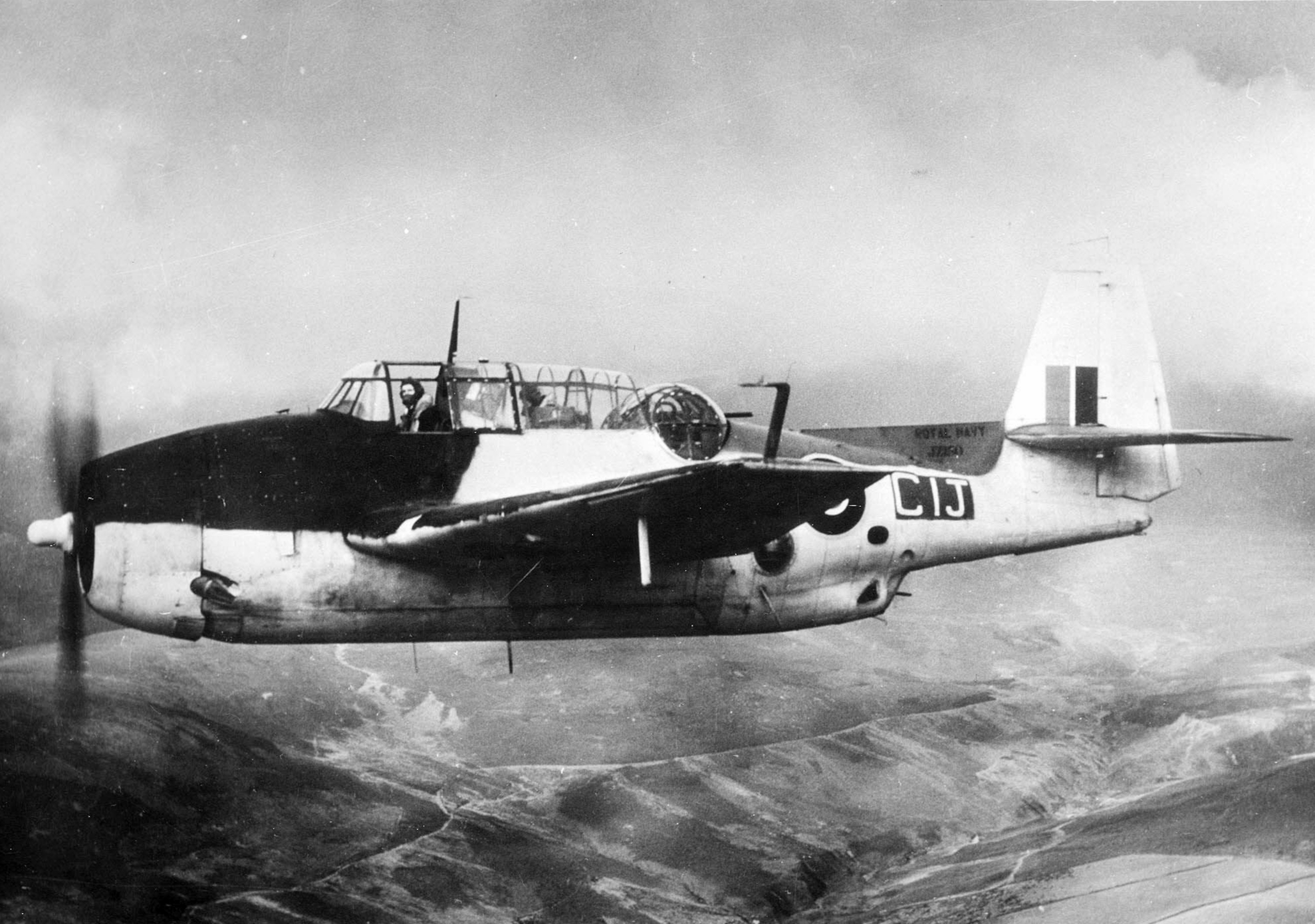
- A Grumman Avenger of 711 NAS in flight
- Active: Royal Air Force; 1936–1939; Royal Navy: 1939–1940; 1944–1945
- Disbanded: 11 December 1945
- Country: United Kingdom
- Branch: Royal Navy
- Type: Fleet Air Arm Second Line Squadron
- Role: Catapult Flight; Torpedo Bomber Reconnaissance Training Squadron
- Size: Squadron
- Part of: Fleet Air Arm
- Home station: See Naval air stations section for full list.

Commanders
- Notable commanders: Lieutenant Commander A.H.T. Fleming, RN

Insignia
- Identification Markings: 067-071 (Osprey & Walrus); UM-UX (Walrus 1936); 067-071 (Walrus 1937); F9A+ (Walrus from May 1939); C5A+ & C6A+ (Barracuda); C1A+ (Avenger); C6A+ (Avenger)

Aircraft flown
- Attack: Fairey Barracuda; Grumman Avenger
- Bomber: Hawker Osprey
- Patrol: Supermarine Walrus
- Trainer: Avro Anson

711 Naval Air Squadron (711 NAS), also known as 711 Squadron, is an inactive Fleet Air Arm (FAA) naval air squadron of the United Kingdom’s Royal Navy (RN). It last operated the Fairey Barracuda and Grumman Avenger between 1944 and 1945, as a Torpedo Bomber Reconnaissance Training Squadron, based at HMS Jackdaw, in Fife, Scotland, it was operational for just over one year before it was absorbed by 785 Naval Air Squadron.

It was first formed from 447 (Catapult) Flight in 1936 and operated out of the Island of Malta, providing flights for the Royal Navy’s 1st Cruiser Squadron. By the beginning of the Second World War it had become a Squadron and was based in Egypt, but disbanded in 1940 when the Fleet Air Arm centralised the operations of the 700 series "Catapult" flights attached to catapult units.

== History ==
=== Catapult Flight (1936-1940) ===
711 Naval Air Squadron originally formed as 711 (Catapult) Flight, out of 447 (Catapult) Flight in 1936. It was based at RAF Kalafrana, Malta, and tasked with supporting ships of the Mediterranean Fleet, specifically the 1st Cruiser Squadron. It was equipped initially with Hawker Osprey, a navalised version of the Hawker Hart biplane light bomber aircraft, which were embarked in the County-class heavy cruisers of the Royal Navy. The Flight had achieved Squadron status by the beginning of World War Two and had replaced the Hawker Osprey with Supermarine Walrus, a British single-engine amphibious biplane and had moved to Aboukir, in Egypt. It was absorbed into 700 Naval Air Squadron in 1940.

==== Ships Flights ====
711 (Catapult) Flight operated a number of ships’ flights between 1936 and 1940 whilst based out of Malta, including HMS Devonshire between 1936 and 1940, HMS London between 1936 and 1938, HMS Shropshire between 1936 and 1940 and HMS Sussex between 1936 and 1939.

=== Torpedo Bomber Reconnaissance Training Squadron (1944-1945) ===
711 Naval Air Squadron reformed on 9 September 1944, as a torpedo bomber reconnaissance (TBR) training squadron, based at RNAS Crail (HMS Jackdaw), in Fife, Scotland and operating with Fairey Barracuda, which was a British carrier-borne torpedo and dive bomber. During August 1945 some of the Fairey Barracuda aircraft were replaced with Grumman TBF Avenger, an American torpedo bomber operated by the Fleet Air Arm. This part of the squadron was an Avenger Operational Training Unit. In December 1945, 711 Naval Air Squadron disbanded at HMS Jackdaw. The need for the type of training the squadron provided had decreased with the end of the Second World War and the remainder of the squadron became ‘C’ Flight of 785 Naval Air Squadron.

== Aircraft flown ==
711 Naval Air Squadron operated a number of different aircraft types:

- Hawker Osprey III/FP spotter and reconnaissance aircraft (July - December 1936)
- Supermarine Walrus amphibious maritime patrol aircraft (October 1936 - January 1940)
- Fairey Barracuda Mk II torpedo and dive bomber (September 1944 - December 1945)
- Avro Anson Mk I/ASV trainer aircraft (January - August 1945)
- Grumman Avenger Mk II torpedo bomber (August - December 1945)
- Grumman Avenger Mk I torpedo bomber (September - December 1945)

== Naval air stations ==
711 Naval Air Squadron operated from a naval air station of the Royal Navy in the Scotland and a number of airbases overseas:

1936 - 1940

- Royal Air Force Kalafrana, Malta, (15 July 1936 - 18 August 1939)
- Royal Air Force Aboukir, Egypt, (19 August 1939 - 21 January 1940)
- disbanded - 21 January 1940

1945

- Royal Naval Air Station Crail (HMS Jackdaw), Fife, (9 September 1944 - 11 December 1945)
- became 'C' Flight 785 Naval Air Squadron (11 December 1945)

== Commanding officers ==
List of commanding officers of 711 Naval Air Squadron with date of appointment:

1936 - 1940

- Lieutenant Commander A.A. Murray, RN, (Squadron Leader, RAF), from 15 July 1936
- Lieutenant A.C.R. Duvall, RN, (Flight Lieutenant, RAF), from 28 September 1936
- Lieutenant Commander J.E. Fenton, RN, (Flight Lieutenant, RAF), from 2 November 1936
- Lieutenant R.J.H. Stephens, RN, (Flight Lieutenant, RAF), from 28 June 1937
- Lieutenant P.A. Booth, RN, (Flight Lieutenant, RAF), from 16 October 1937 (KIFA 30 November 1937)
- Flight Lieutenant E.H.D. Stokes, RAF, 1 December 1937
- Lieutenant Commander O.S. Stevinson, RN, (Squadron Leader, RAF), from 17 January 1938
- Lieutenant Commander A.H.T. Fleming, RN, from 24 May 1939
- disbanded - 21 January 1940

1940 - 1945

- Lieutenant Commander(A) J.B. Curgenven-Robinson, DSC, RNVR, from 9 September 1944
- Lieutenant Commander(A) D.M. Judd, DSC, RNVR, from 30 July 1945
- disbanded - 11 December 1945

Note: Abbreviation (A) signifies Air Branch of the RN or RNVR.
