= RNAS Crail =

Former Royal Naval Air Station in Fife, Scotland

RNAS Crail HMS Jackdaw HMS Bruce 1947-49
- Crail, Fife in Scotland
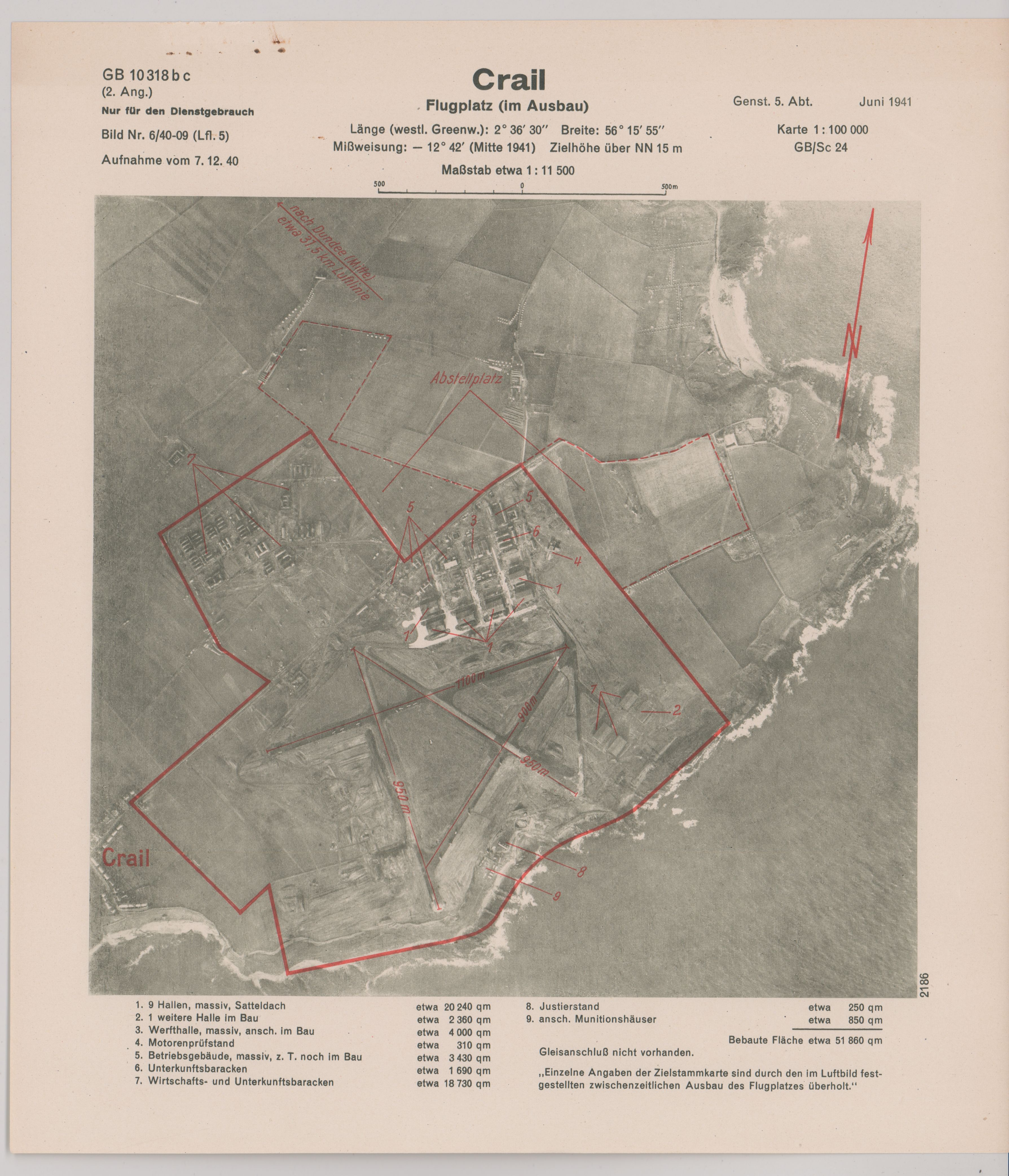
- RNAS Crail on a target dossier of the German Luftwaffe, 1941

Site information
- Type: Royal Naval Air Station
- Owner: Admiralty
- Operator: Royal Navy
- Controlled by: Fleet Air Arm
- Condition: Disused

Location
- Shown within Fife RNAS Crail (the United Kingdom)
- Coordinates: 56°16′09″N 002°36′11″W

Site history
- Built: 1918; 1940
- In use: 1918-? 1940-1961
- Fate: Farmland / Industry / Leisure use
- Battles/wars: European theatre of World War II

Airfield information
- Elevation: 23 metres (75 ft) AMSL
Runways
| Direction | Length and surface |
|---|---|
| 03/21 | 914 metres (2,999 ft) Concrete |
| 07/25 | 1,097 metres (3,599 ft) Concrete |
| 12/30 | 914 metres (2,999 ft) Concrete |
| 16/34 | 914 metres (2,999 ft) Concrete |

Royal Naval Air Station Crail, commonly known as RNAS Crail; (commissioned as HMS Jackdaw and later briefly HMS Bruce), is a former Royal Navy Naval Air Station for use by the Fleet Air Arm, located 4.9 miles (7.9 km) east of Anstruther, Fife and 8.8 miles (14.2 km) from St Andrews, Fife, Scotland.

It was also home to a site of the Joint Services School for Linguists from 1956 to 1960.

== Units ==
A number of units were here at some point:

- No. 104 Squadron RAF
- 120th Aero Squadron
- 711 Naval Air Squadron
- 747 Naval Air Squadron
- 758 Naval Air Squadron
- 770 Naval Air Squadron
- 778 Naval Air Squadron
- 780 Naval Air Squadron
- 785 Naval Air Squadron
- 786 Naval Air Squadron
- 800 Naval Air Squadron
- 810 Naval Air Squadron
- 811 Naval Air Squadron
- 812 Naval Air Squadron
- 816 Naval Air Squadron
- 817 Naval Air Squadron
- 819 Naval Air Squadron
- 820 Naval Air Squadron
- 822 Naval Air Squadron
- 823 Naval Air Squadron
- 826 Naval Air Squadron
- 827 Naval Air Squadron
- 828 Naval Air Squadron
- 829 Naval Air Squadron
- 831 Naval Air Squadron
- 832 Naval Air Squadron
- 833 Naval Air Squadron
- 834 Naval Air Squadron
- 836 Naval Air Squadron
- 837 Naval Air Squadron
- 837A Flight
- 846 Naval Air Squadron
- Aircraft Torpedo Development Unit RAF
- No. 4 Ferry Flight RAF
- No. 27 Training Depot Station
- No. 50 Training Squadron

== Current use ==
The site is currently used for industrial work, farming and car drag racing.

== See also ==
- List of air stations of the Royal Navy
