= 747 Naval Air Squadron =

Inactive flying squadron of the Royal Navy's Fleet Air Arm

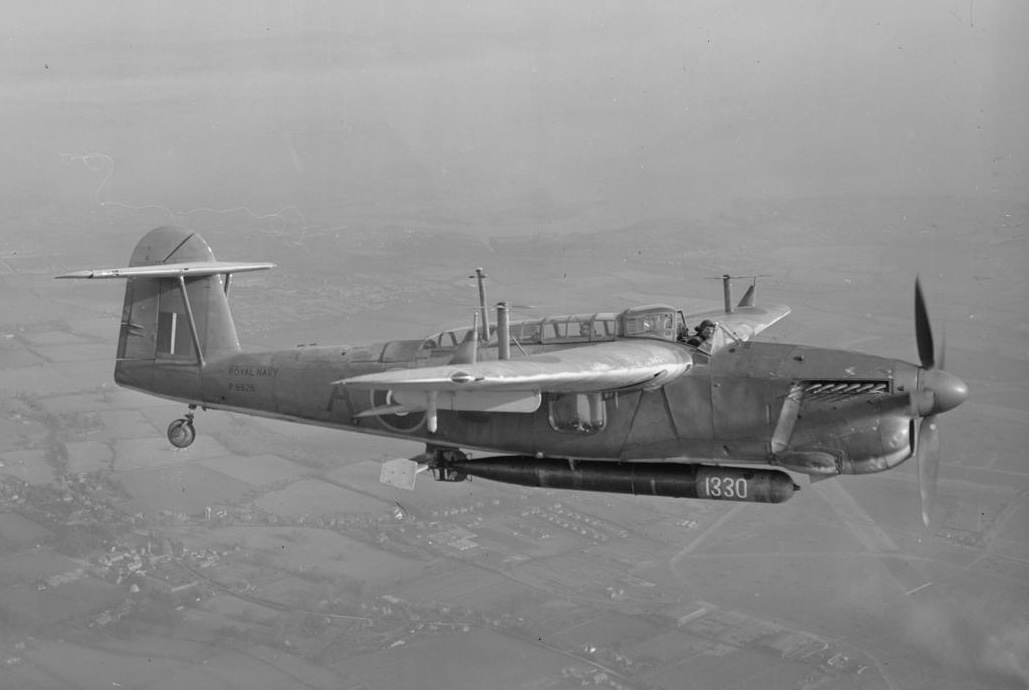
- Fairey Barracuda Mk II; an example of the type used by 747 NAS
- Active: 1943–1945
- Disbanded: 20 December 1945
- Country: United Kingdom
- Branch: Royal Navy
- Type: Fleet Air Arm Second Line Squadron
- Role: Torpedo Bomber Reconnaissance Pool; Operational Training Unit
- Size: Squadron
- Part of: Fleet Air Arm
- Home station: See Naval air stations section for full list.
- Aircraft: See Aircraft operated section for full list.

Commanders
- Notable commanders: Rear Admiral John Augustine Ievers CB, OBE

Insignia
- Identification Markings: K2A+ (Barracuda December 1943); F2A+ (Barracuda January 1944); R2A+ to R7A+ (Barracuda July 1944)

747 Naval Air Squadron (747 NAS), also called 747 Squadron, is an inactive Fleet Air Arm (FAA) naval air squadron of the United Kingdom’s Royal Navy (RN). It was last active between 1943 and 1945 as an Operational Training Unit, as part of the No. 1 Naval Operational Training Unit, operating from a number of naval air stations.

The squadron was initially part of the Torpedo Bomber Reconnaissance Pool and formed at HMS Owl, RNAS Fearn, Scottish Highlands, in March 1943, before evolving into an Operational Training Unit. July saw the squadron move to HMS Nightjar, RNAS Inskip, Lancashire and then became part of the No. 1 Naval Operational Training Unit. It returned to HMS Owl in January 1944 and then to HMS Urley, RNAS Ronaldsway, Isle of Man, in July. In November 1945 the squadron headquarters moved to HMS Jackdaw, RNAS Crail, Fife, leaving a Flight at HMS Urley.

== History ==
=== Torpedo Bomber Reconnaissance Pool (1943) ===
747 Naval Air Squadron formed at RNAS Fearn (HMS Owl), in Scottish Highlands, on 22 March 1943 as a Torpedo Bomber Reconnaissance Pool squadron. It was initially equipped with three Fairey Swordfish, a biplane torpedo bomber, three Fairey Barracuda, a torpedo and dive bomber and a few Avro Anson multi-role training aircraft, fitted out as radar flying classrooms.

=== Operational Training Unit (1943-1945) ===
The squadron evolved into an Operational Training Unit and on 9 July, it moved to RNAS Inskip (HMS Nightjar), in Lancashire and became part of No. 1 Naval Operational Training Unit. Here it added Fairey Albacore, a biplane torpedo bomber, to its strength. It returned to RNAS Fearn (HMS Owl) with No. 1 OTU when the OTU moved there on 26 January 1944. The unit remained until the summer when it then relocated to RNAS Ronaldsway (HMS Urley) on the Isle of Man during July 1944.

When the squadron headquarters moved to RNAS Crail (HMS Jackdaw), in Fife, Scotland, in November 1945, the Avro Anson equipped ’B’ Flight remained at RNAS Ronaldsway. 747 Naval Air Squadron disbanded on 20 December 1945.

== Aircraft operated ==
The squadron operated a variety of different aircraft and versions:

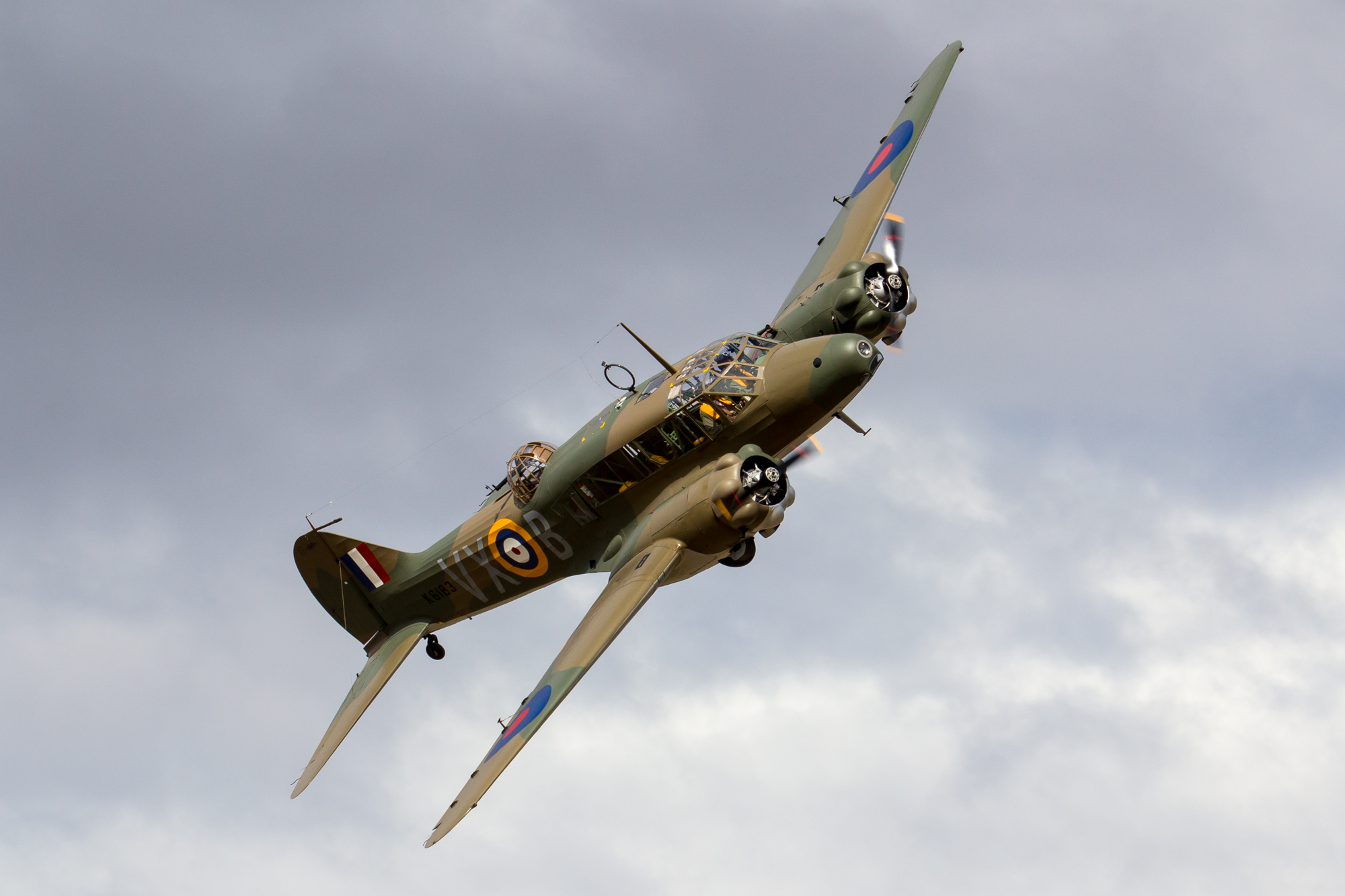
Avro Anson Mk I

- Fairey Barracuda Mk I torpedo and dive bomber (March - July 1943)
- Fairey Albacore torpedo bomber (March - September 1943)
- Fairey Swordfish I torpedo bomber (March 1943 - February 1944)
- Avro Anson Mk I multi-role training aircraft (March 1943 - December 1945)
- Fairey Barracuda Mk II torpedo and dive bomber (March 1943 - December 1945)
- Fairey Swordfish II torpedo bomber (June - July 1943)
- Supermarine Walrus I amphibious maritime patrol aircraft (July 1943 - April 1944)
- Fairey Barracuda Mk III torpedo and dive bomber (January - December 1945)
- Stinson Reliant I liaison and training aircraft (September - December 1945)

== Naval air stations ==
747 Naval Air Squadron operated from a number of naval air stations of the Royal Navy, in Scotland, England and on the Isle of Man:

- Royal Naval Air Station Fearn (HMS Owl), Scottish Highlands, (22 March 1943 - 9 June 1943)
- Royal Naval Air Station Inskip (HMS Nightjar), Lancashire, (9 June 1943 - 26 January 1944)
- Royal Naval Air Station Fearn (HMS Owl), Scottish Highlands, (26 January 1944 - 14 July 1944)
- Royal Naval Air Station Ronaldsway (HMS Urley), Isle of Man, (14 July 1944 - 15 November 1944)
- Royal Naval Air Station Crail (HMS Jackdaw), Fife, (15 November 1945 - 20 December 1945)
  - Royal Naval Air Station Ronaldsway (HMS Urley), Isle of Man, ('B' Flight 15 November - 20 December 1945)
- disbanded - (20 December 1945)

== Commanding officers ==
List of commanding officers of 747 Naval Air Squadron with date of appointment:

- Lieutenant Commander J.A. Ievers, RN, from 22 March 1943
- Lieutenant Commander(A) F.A. Swanton, DSC, RN, from 13 September 1943
- Lieutenant Commander(A) T.M. Bassett, RNZNVR, from 1 March 1944
- Lieutenant Commander(A) R.D. Kingdon, DSC, RNVR, from 6 November 1944
- Lieutenant Commander(A) J.E. Barker, RNVR, from 18 April 1945
- Lieutenant Commander(A) J.O. Sparke, RNVR, from 1 August 1945
- disbanded - 20 December 1945

Note: Abbreviation (A) signifies Air Branch of the RN or RNVR.
