= List of Fairey Firefly operators =

The following countries and squadrons operated the Fairey Firefly:

== Operators ==
Australia

- Royal Australian Navy – Fleet Air Arm
  - 723 Squadron RAN - Mk.5 T.2, TT.5 & AS.6 (1952–56)
  - 724 Squadron RAN - Mk.6, T.5 & TT.6 (1955-56 & 1962–66)
  - 725 Squadron RAN - TT.5 & TT.6 (1958–59)
  - 816 Squadron RAN - FR.4, AS.5/FR.5 & AS.6 (1948–55)
  - 817 Squadron RAN - AS.5/FR.5 & AS.6 (1950–55)
  - 851 Squadron RAN - T.5 & AS.6 (1954–58)
- Royal Australian Air Force
  - Aircraft Research and Development Unit RAAF (Firefly T.5 VX373 for trials 1953)

Canada

- Royal Canadian Navy
  - 825 Squadron RCN - F.1/FR.1, FR.4 & AS.5 (1945–51) - renumbered as 880 Squadron RCN on 1 May 1951
  - 826 Squadron RCN - F.1/FR.1 & T.1 (1946–50) - renumbered as 880 Squadron RCN on 1 May 1951
  - 880 Squadron RCN - AS.5 (1951)
  - 10 Heavier-than-air Experimental Air Squadron (VX-10) RCN

Denmark

- Royal Danish Air Force

Ethiopia

- Imperial Ethiopian Air Force operated 23 Fireflies between 1952 and 1960.

India

- Indian Navy
  - Indian Naval Air Arm operated 10 Fireflies from 1955 onwards for target tugging.

Sweden

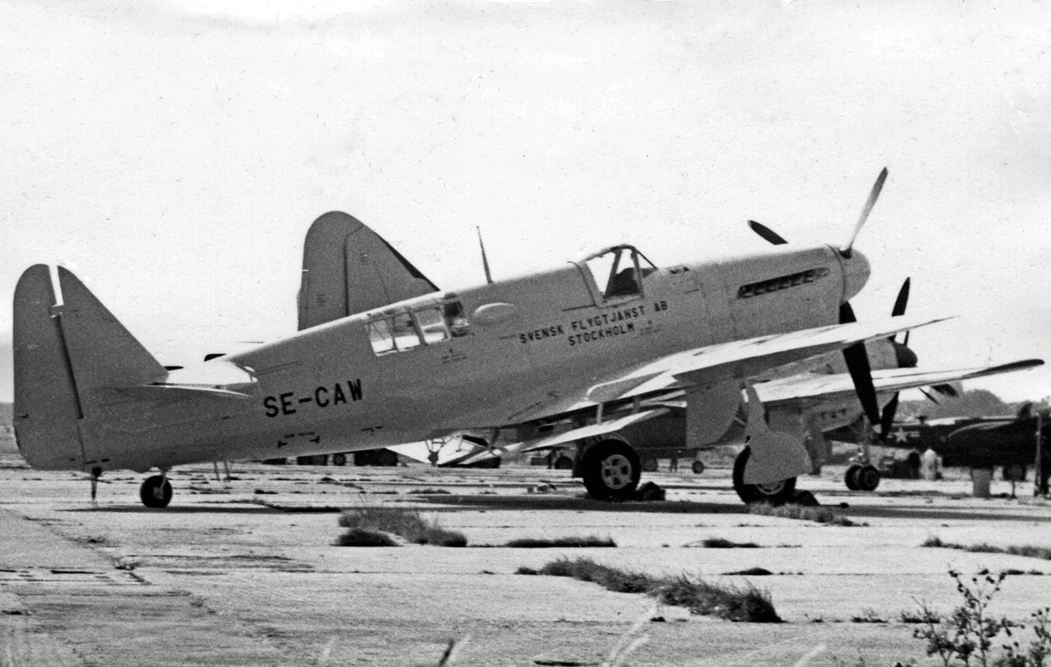
Firefly TT.Mk I of Svensk Flygtjänst AB in 1955

- Svensk Flygtjänst AB at Bromma Airport operated 19 TT.1 aircraft between 31 January 1949 and 17 October 1963.

Netherlands

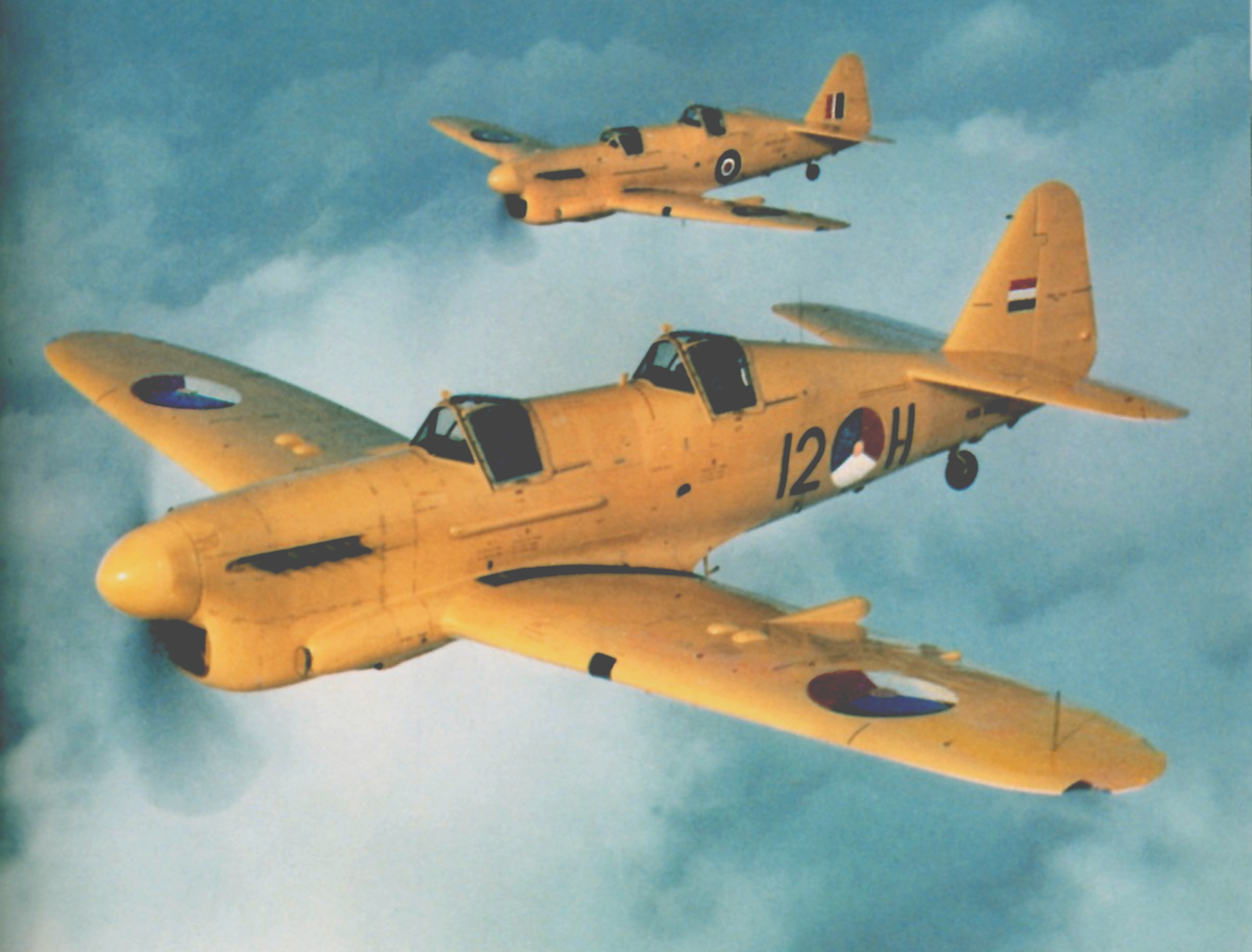
Firefly T.Mk 1 of Royal Netherlands Navy in 1948

- Royal Netherlands Navy
  - Dutch Naval Aviation Service
    - VSQ-1
    - VSQ-2
    - VSQ-4
    - VSQ-5
    - VSQ-7
    - VSQ-860 - F.1/FR.1 (1946–50)

Thailand

- Royal Thai Air Force operated Fireflies between 1952 and 1966.
- Royal Thai Navy

United Kingdom

- Royal Navy – Fleet Air Arm operated Fireflies for anti-submarine warfare until 1956 when front line aircraft were replaced by the Fairey Gannet.
- 700 Naval Air Squadron - F.1/FR.1 & TT.4
- 703 Naval Air Squadron - F.1/FR.1, FR.4, AS.5/FR.5 & AS.6
  - 703A Flight - AS.5/FR.5 & AS.6
- 706 Naval Air Squadron - F.1/FR.1
- 719 Naval Air Squadron - F.1/FR.1, AS.5/FR.5, AS.6 & T.7
- 727 Naval Air Squadron - FR.4
- 728B Flight - U.8 & U.9
- 730 Naval Air Squadron - F.1/FR.1
- 731 Naval Air Squadron - F.1/FR.1
- 732 Naval Air Squadron - NF.I
- 736 Naval Air Squadron - F.1/FR.1, T.1 & FR.4
- 737 Naval Air Squadron - F.1/FR.1, T.1, T.2 & AS.5/FR.5
  - 737X Flight - AS.5/FR.5 & AS.6
- 741 Naval Air Squadron - F.1/FR.1
- 744 Naval Air Squadron - F.1/FR.1, T.1, T.2 & AS.6
- 746 Naval Air Squadron - NF.I & NF.II
- 748 Naval Air Squadron - F.1/FR.1
- 750 Naval Air Squadron - T.7
- 751 Naval Air Squadron - AS.6
- 759 Naval Air Squadron - F.1/FR.1
- 764 Naval Air Squadron - F.1/FR.1, T.1 & T.2
- 765 Naval Air Squadron - T.2 & T.7
- 766 Naval Air Squadron - F.1/FR.1, T.1 & T.2
- 767 Naval Air Squadron - F.1/FR.1, T.1, FR.4 & AS.6
- 768 Naval Air Squadron - F.1/FR.1
- 771 Naval Air Squadron - F.1/FR.1, T.1, T.2, TT.4, TT.5 & AS.6
- 772 Naval Air Squadron - F.1/FR.1 & NF.II
- 778 Naval Air Squadron - F.1/FR.1, T.1, FR.4 & AS.5/FR.5
- 780 Naval Air Squadron - F.1/FR.1
- 781 Naval Air Squadron - F.1/FR.1, T.1, T.2, FR.4 & AS.5/FR.5
- 782 Naval Air Squadron - F.1/FR.1, T.1, T.2, FR.4, AS.5/FR.5 & AS.6
- 783 Naval Air Squadron - F.1/FR.1
- 784 Naval Air Squadron - NF.I
- 787 Naval Air Squadron - F.1/FR.1 & FR.4
- 790 Naval Air Squadron - F.1/FR.1
- 792 Naval Air Squadron - NF.I
- 794 Naval Air Squadron - NF.I
- 795 Naval Air Squadron - F.1/FR.1
- 796 Naval Air Squadron - F.1/FR.1, T.3, AS.5/FR.5, AS.6 & T.7
- 798 Naval Air Squadron - F.1/FR.1
- 799 Naval Air Squadron - F.1/FR.1, T.1, T.2 & FR.4
- 804 Naval Air Squadron - AS.5/FR.5
- 805 Naval Air Squadron - F.1/FR.1 & NF.I
- 810 Naval Air Squadron - FR.4 & AS.5/FR.5
- 812 Naval Air Squadron - F.1/FR.1, NF.I, T.1, FR.4, AS.5/FR.5 & AS.6
- 813 Naval Air Squadron - FR.1 (1952-53)
- 814 Naval Air Squadron - F.1/FR.1, FR.4, AS.5/FR.5 & AS.6
- 815 Naval Air Squadron - T.1
- 816 Naval Air Squadron - F.1/FR.1 & NF.I (1945-48)
- 820 Naval Air Squadron - AS.5/FR.5 & AS.6
- 821 Naval Air Squadron - AS.5/FR.5 & AS.6
- 822 Naval Air Squadron - F.1/FR.1
- 824 Naval Air Squadron - F.1/FR.1 & AS.6
- 825 Naval Air Squadron - AS.5/FR.5 (1951-52 & 1953-54)
- 826 Naval Air Squadron - AS.6 (1951-55)
- 827 Naval Air Squadron - F.1/FR.1 & NF.I
- 837 Naval Air Squadron - F.1/FR.1
- 851 Naval Air Squadron - AS.6
- 861 Naval Air Squadron - F.1/FR.1
- 882 Naval Air Squadron- NF.I (1945) (attached from 746 NAS)
- 1770 Naval Air Squadron - F.1/FR.1
- 1771 Naval Air Squadron - F.1/FR.1
- 1772 Naval Air Squadron - F.1/FR.1
- 1790 Naval Air Squadron - F.1/FR.1 & NF.I
- 1791 Naval Air Squadron - F.1/FR.1 & NF.I
- 1792 Naval Air Squadron - NF.I
- Royal Naval Volunteer Reserve
  - 1830 Naval Air Squadron - F.1/FR.1, T.1, T.2, T.3, AS.5/FR.5 & AS.6
  - 1831 Naval Air Squadron - T.1 & T.3
  - 1833 Naval Air Squadron - T.2 & T.3
  - 1840 Naval Air Squadron - T.2, FR.4, AS.6 & T.7
  - 1841 Naval Air Squadron - F.1/FR.1, T.2, T.3 & AS.6
  - 1842 Naval Air Squadron
  - 1843 Naval Air Squadron
  - 1844 Naval Air Squadron - T.2, T.3, AS.5/FR.5 & AS.6

== See also ==
- Fairey Firefly
