= 1792 Naval Air Squadron =

Inactive flying squadron of the Royal Navy's Fleet Air Arm

- Squadron badge
- Active: 1945–1946
- Disbanded: 17 April 1946
- Country: United Kingdom
- Branch: Royal Navy
- Type: Two-seat fighter squadron
- Role: Night fighter
- Size: Squadron
- Part of: Fleet Air Arm
- Home station: See Naval air stations section for full list.
- Mottos: Nocte vincimus (Latin for 'We conquer by night')

Commanders
- Notable commanders: Lieutenant commander(A) S Dixon-Child, RNVR

Insignia
- Squadron Badge Description: Per fess black and barry wavy of six white and block a dagger in pale white pommel and hilt gold winged white (1946)
- Identification Markings: single letters 4A+ (HMS Ocean)

Aircraft flown
- Fighter: Fairey Firefly NF.Mk I

1792 Naval Air Squadron (1792 NAS), sometimes referred to as 1792 Squadron, is an inactive Fleet Air Arm (FAA) naval air squadron of the United Kingdom’s Royal Navy (RN). It was formed in May 1945 at RNAS Lee-on-Solent, HMS Daedalus, Hampshire, as a Night Fighter squadron. It was equipped with the Fairey Firefly NF.Mk I night fighter. The squadron joined the Colossus-class light fleet carrier HMS Ocean in December for service in the Mediterranean. On return to the UK the squadron was disbanded in April 1946.

== History ==
=== Night Fighter Squadron (1945-1946) ===
1792 Naval Air Squadron formed at RNAS Lee-on-Solent (HMS Daedalus), on 15 May 1945, as a night fighter squadron. It was equipped with Fairey Firefly NF.Mk I, a night fighter variant of the carrier-borne fighter, anti-submarine and reconnaissance aircraft, which was fitted with radar in a centre-line container. Around one month later the squadron moved north to Lancashire, relocating to RNAS Inskip (HMS Nightjar) on 15 June.

During August it moved to RNAS Drem (HMS Nighthawk), East Lothian, Scotland, where the Naval Night Fighter School and Night Fighter Direction Centre were based. The squadron spent almost three months at RNAS Drem working up before moving to RNAS Machrihanish (HMS Landrail), Argyll and Bute, Scotland, on 27 November and two weeks later embarked in the Colossus-class aircraft carrier HMS Ocean for the Mediterranean.

Aboard the aircraft carrier it worked with 892 Naval Air Squadron, which operated Grumman Hellcat N.F. Mk II, the night fighter variant of the American carrier-based fighter aircraft, as a Night Fighter Air Group. Six weeks between 4 January and 8 February 1946 were spent at RNAS Hal Far (HMS Falcon), Malta, before returning to the UK in HMS Ocean, where the squadron disbanded on 17 April 1946.

== Aircraft flown ==
1792 Naval Air Squadron flew only one aircraft type:

- Fairey Firefly NF.Mk I night fighter (May 1945 - April 1946)

== Naval air stations ==
1792 Naval Air Squadron operated from a number of naval air stations of the Royal Navy in the United Kingdom, one overseas in Malta, and a Royal Navy light fleet carrier:

- Royal Naval Air Station Lee-on-Solent (HMS Daedalus), Hampshire, (15 May - 15 June 1945)
- Royal Naval Air Station Inskip (HMS Nightjar), Lancashire, (15 June - 29 August 1945)
- Royal Naval Air Station Drem (HMS Nighthawk), East Lothian, (29 August - 27 November 1945)
- Royal Naval Air Station Machrihanish (HMS Landrail), Argyll and Bute, (27 November - 11 December 1945)
- HMS Ocean, Colossus-class light fleet carrier (11 December 1945 - 4 January 1946)
- Royal Naval Air Station Hal Far (HMS Falcon), Malta, (4 January - 18 February 1946)
- HMS Ocean (18 February - 17 April 1946)
- disbanded - 17 April 1946

== Commanding officers ==
List of commanding officers of 1792 Naval Air Squadron with date of appointment:

- Lieutenant Commander(A) S. Dixon-Child, RNVR, from 15 May 1945
- disbanded - 17 April 1946

Note: Abbreviation (A) signifies Air Branch of the RN or RNVR.
