= Fred Stovin-Bradford =

Royal Navy officer and aviator

Captain Fred Stovin-Bradford CBE DSC*
- Portrait of Stovin-Bradford in 1942 by William Dring
- Born: 19 June 1919; Hendon, Middlesex, England
- Died: 23 September 1974 (aged 55); Sydney, Australia
- Military career
- Allegiance: United Kingdom
- Branch: Royal Navy
- Service years: 1938–1965
- Rank: Captain
- Units: 824 Naval Air Squadron; 700 Naval Air Squadron; 812 Naval Air Squadron
- Commands: 825 Naval Air Squadron; 735 Naval Air Squadron; 810 Naval Air Squadron; 17th Carrier Air Group; RNAS Brawdy
- Conflicts: World War II; Korean War
- Awards: Commander of the Order of the British Empire; Distinguished Service Cross & Bar

Frederick Stovin-Bradford (19 June 1919 – 23 September 1974) was a Royal Navy officer and aviator in the Fleet Air Arm. During his career, Stovin-Bradford was involved in the sinking of the Iride, was one of the youngest officers to be promoted to the rank of captain since Nelson's time, and served as Staff Officer to the Flag Officer of Home Air Command in England and later Chief Staff Officer to the Flag Officer in charge of East Australia. His obituary in The Times described him as one of the most colourful personalities in the Fleet Air Arm.

== Early life and education ==
Stovin-Bradford was born in Hendon, Middlesex, and was educated at Bedford Modern School.

== World War II ==
He joined the Fleet Air Arm of the Royal Navy as a midshipman on 21 November 1938, and was posted to HMS Hermes at HMNB Devonport for training, eventually completing the observer's course at HMS Excellent in August 1939, just prior to the declaration of war against Germany.

Stovin-Bradford first served in 824 Naval Air Squadron flying in Fairey Swordfish torpedo bombers aboard the carrier HMS Eagle from October 1939, and seeing action in the Mediterranean; at the Battle of Calabria in July 1940, and in the sinking of the Iride and three other vessels in the Gulf of Bomba on 23 August, for which he was subsequently awarded the Distinguished Service Cross.

He was promoted to sub-lieutenant on 5 November 1940, with seniority from 19 June. After a period of time posted to the Admiralty at the end of 1941, he was promoted to lieutenant on 1 February 1942. After completing an Air Signaller's course, he was posted to 700 Naval Air Squadron in July 1942 to serve aboard the battleship HMS King George V, flying in Supermarine Walrus reconnaissance aircraft, and taking part in Russian convoys in May, in the landings in North Africa in November, and during the invasion of Sicily in July 1943. He was posted to the escort carrier HMS Vindex in September 1943 to serve as Operations Officer, taking part in hunter-killer operations in the Atlantic and on Arctic convoys, then served as a Liaison Officer on the staff of the Commander-in-Chief, Western Approaches Admiral Sir Max Horton from September 1944. Stovin-Bradford commanded 825 Naval Air Squadron from its reformation at RNAS Rattray in July 1945, and from 28 December 1945 commanded 735 Naval Air Squadron based at RNAS Burscough.

== Post-war career ==
In 1946 Stovin-Bradford qualified as a pilot, and served in 812 Naval Air Squadron flying the Fairey Firefly Mk. VI, as part of 14th Carrier Air Group (14 CAG), also completing courses in fighter combat, ground attack and reconnaissance at the School of Naval Air Warfare.

He was promoted to lieutenant-commander on 1 February 1948, and served as Commanding Officer of 810 Naval Air Squadron (17th Carrier Air Group), and was the first British pilot to land on the Arromanches, eventually commanding 17 CAG aboard HMS Theseus from September 1950 during the Korean War. He was promoted to commander on 31 December 1950, and for his "distinguished service in operations in Korean waters" he was awarded a bar to his Distinguished Service Cross on 29 June 1951.

From 1951 he served as Commander (Air) at the Naval Fighter School at RNAS Culdrose, and then from 1954 was a Staff Officer (Air) to the Flag Officer Aircraft Carriers, (HMS Glory and HMS Albion) receiving promotion to captain on 31 December 1955. According to his obituary, he was one of the youngest officers to be promoted to the rank of captain since the time of Nelson. From 31 July 1956 he was the Commanding Officer of RNAS Brawdy, Pembrokeshire West Wales, and from July 1958 to September 1960 was 'on loan' to the Royal Australian Navy, serving as Chief Staff Officer to Flag Officer-in-Charge, East Australia Area, based at HMAS Kuttabul.

From June 1962 he was the Chief of Staff to Vice-Admiral John Graham Hamilton, Flag Officer Air (Home), based at RNAS Lee-on-Solent. Stovin-Bradford retired from the Navy on 30 July 1965, being made a Commander of the Order of the British Empire in the 1966 New Year Honours.

== Later life ==
He then returned to Australia to live in Sydney, and to enjoy his wider interests. He was a fine musician, who composed Flying Stations, a special march for the Fleet Air Arm, which received its first public performance at the Royal Tournament at Earls Court in 1963. He was also an avid follower of Rugby Union, having served as President of Barbarian F.C., became a First Grade referee, and was serving as Vice-President of Eastwood Rugby Club at the time of his death.

Stovin-Bradford died in Sydney in 1974 and was survived by his wife and four children.
