= 1791 Naval Air Squadron =

Inactive flying squadron of the Royal Navy's Fleet Air Arm

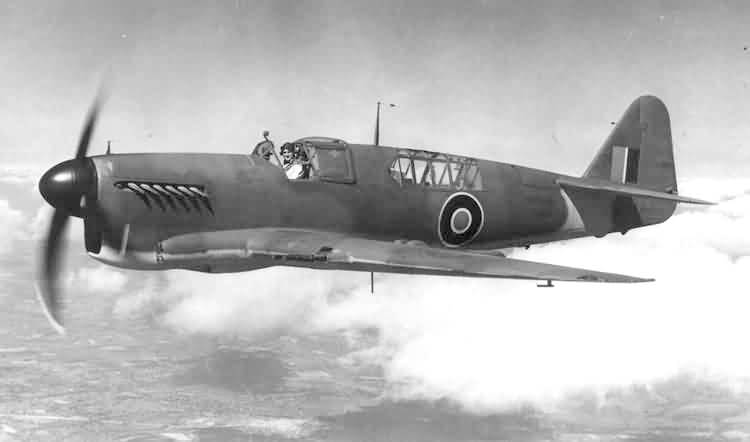
- Fairey Firefly I; an example of the type used by 1791 NAS
- Active: 1945
- Disbanded: 23 September 1945
- Country: United Kingdom
- Branch: Royal Navy
- Type: Two-seat fighter squadron
- Role: Night fighter
- Size: Squadron
- Part of: Fleet Air Arm
- Home station: See Naval air stations section for full list.

Commanders
- Notable commanders: Lieutenant commander(A) H.J. Hunter, RCNVR

Insignia
- Squadron Badge Description: A Red Indian's head. (Wartime unofficial)
- Identification Markings: single letters

Aircraft flown
- Fighter: Fairey Firefly

1791 Naval Air Squadron (1791 NAS), sometimes called 1791 Squadron, is an inactive Fleet Air Arm (FAA) naval air squadron of the United Kingdom’s Royal Navy (RN). It was formed on 15 March 1945 at RNAS Lee-on-Solent, HMS Daedalus, Hampshire, as a Night Fighter squadron. It was equipped with Fairey Firefly NF.Mk I night fighter. The squadron joined the Ruler-class escort carrier HMS Puncher in June for deck landing practice but saw no action. Following V-J Day the squadron was disbanded on 23 September 1945 at RNAS Burscough, HMS Ringtail, Lancashire.

== History ==
=== Night Fighter Squadron (1945) ===
1792 Naval Air Squadron formed at RNAS Lee-on-Solent (HMS Daedalus), on 15 March 1945, as a night fighter squadron. It was equipped with Fairey Firefly NF.Mk I, a night fighter variant of the carrier-borne fighter, anti-submarine and reconnaissance aircraft, which was fitted with radar in a centre-line container.

It moved to RNAS Inskip (HMS Nightjar), Lancashire, on 19 April and from 11 June the squadron embarked in the Ruler-class escort carrier HMS Puncher, for deck landing training, for a couple of days. The squadron disembarked to RNAS Drem (HMS Nighthawk), East Lothian, Scotland, where the Naval Night Fighter School and Night Fighter Direction Centre were based. It remained in Scotland for two months before returning to Lancashire, this time going to RNAS Burscough (HMS Ringtail) on 18 August.

With the surrender of Japan there was no longer a requirement for the squadron to join the British Pacific Fleet and 1791 Naval Air Squadron disbanded at RNAS Burscough on 23 September.

== Aircraft flown ==
1791 Naval Air Squadron flew only one aircraft type, two variants:

- Fairey Firefly NF.Mk I night fighter (March - September 1945)
- Fairey Firefly I fighter and anti-submarine aircraft (May - September 1945)

== Naval air stations ==
1791 Naval Air Squadron operated from a number of naval air stations of the Royal Navy in the United Kingdom:

- Royal Naval Air Station Lee-on-Solent (HMS Daedalus), Hampshire, (15 March - 19 April 1945)
- Royal Naval Air Station Inskip (HMS Nightjar), Lancashire, (19 April - 11 June 1945)
  - HMS Puncher, Ruler-class escort carrier, (Detachment six aircraft Deck Landing Training (DLT) 11 - 13 June 1945)
- Royal Naval Air Station Drem (HMS Nighthawk), East Lothian, (18 June - 18 August 1945)
- Royal Naval Air Station Burscough (HMS Ringtail), Lancashire, (18 August - 23 September 1945)
- disbanded - (23 September 1945)

== Commanding officers ==
List of commanding officers of 1791 Naval Air Squadron with date of appointment:

- Lieutenant Commander(A) H.J. Hunter, RCNVR, from 15 March 1945
- disbanded - 23 September 1945

Note: Abbreviation (A) signifies Air Branch of the RN or RNVR.
