= RNAS Inskip =

Former airfield in Lancashire, England

RNAS Inskip HMS Nightjar HMS Inskip MOD Inskip
- Inskip, Lancashire in England
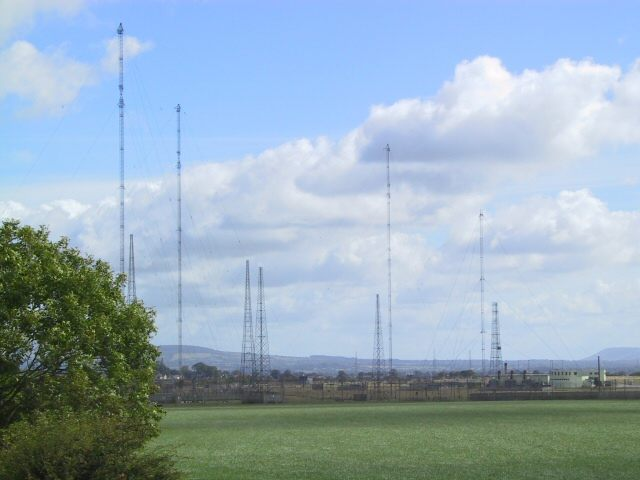

Site information
- Type: Royal Naval Air Station
- Owner: Admiralty
- Operator: Royal Navy
- Controlled by: Fleet Air Arm
- Condition: Disused

Location
- Shown within Lancashire Shown on border of Wyre Borough Shown on border of Fylde Borough
- Coordinates: 53°49′27″N 2°49′56″W
- Area: 600 acres (240 ha)

Site history
- Built: 1942
- In use: 1943-1946
- Fate: Industry / Military communication / Training centre

Airfield information
- Elevation: 46 ft (14 m) AMSL
Runways
Direction	Length and surface
00/18	1,000 yd (910 m) x 30 yd (27 m) Asphalt concrete
05/23	1,000 yd (910 m) x 30 yd (27 m) Asphalt concrete
09/27	1,200 yd (1,100 m) x 30 yd (27 m) Asphalt concrete
14/32	1,030 yd (940 m) x 30 yd (27 m) Asphalt concrete
- Source: Royal Navy Research Archive

Royal Naval Air Station Inskip, or more commonly known as RNAS Inskip; (commissioned HMS Nightjar), was a Royal Navy Naval Air Station near the village of Inskip in Lancashire, England. The city of Preston lies approximately 6 miles (9.7 km) to the south east.

It saw considerable aircrew training activity towards the end of the Second World War. In the 1960s and 70s it was a Royal Navy transmitting station known as HMS Inskip. It is now a military high-frequency radio transmitting station known as MOD Inskip.

== History ==
On 4 June 1942 the Admiralty acquired 600 acres (240 ha) of farmland between Preston and Blackpool from Lord Derby. It planned to build an airfield, to be called RNAS Elswick, for the training of anti-submarine and two-seat strike crews. The location was chosen because of the relatively quiet airspace in the north-west of England and the proximity of coastal ranges in the Morecambe Bay area. Construction of the runways started immediately, and it was commissioned on 15 May 1943 as HMS Nightjar, but with a name change to that of another nearby village, as RNAS Inskip.

Four 100 ft (30 m) wide runways were built, (Note: RAF standard runways were 150 ft (46 m) wide, but the Royal Navy standard was narrower to simulate take-off and landing on aircraft carriers. Also, the Royal Air Force (RAF) standard was just three runways, but the Royal Navy standard was four to reduce crosswind severity, as carriers would sail into wind during flying operations, minimising crosswinds.) along with accommodation for 145 aircraft consisting of 32 Mainhill hangars each 60 ft (18 m) wide by 70 ft (21 m) long and two maintenance hangars 110 ft (34 m) wide by 185 ft (56 m) long. These were grouped into six clusters around the airfield, and a 40 ft (12 m) perimeter taxiway linked them all.

Several local buildings were requisitioned for use as headquarters and hospitals, and accommodation was built at two off-site locations within walking distance for a total of 235 officers and 1,379 other ranks.

747 Naval Air Squadron was the first flying unit to arrive, on 9 June 1943, and No. 1 NOTU (Naval Operational Training Unit), of which 766 Naval Air Squadron had been a part, was the last to operate there, closing down on 26 January 1946.

The airfield operated for just 30 months, but hosted 17 units operating 13 different aircraft types, and employing over 1,600 people. It had a great effect on the local economy and that of the local towns of Preston and especially Blackpool.

There had been one open day, held on 20 October 1945, to celebrate the end of the war. Many aircraft types were displayed, including one from the Americans based at nearby Warton Aerodrome.

== Units ==
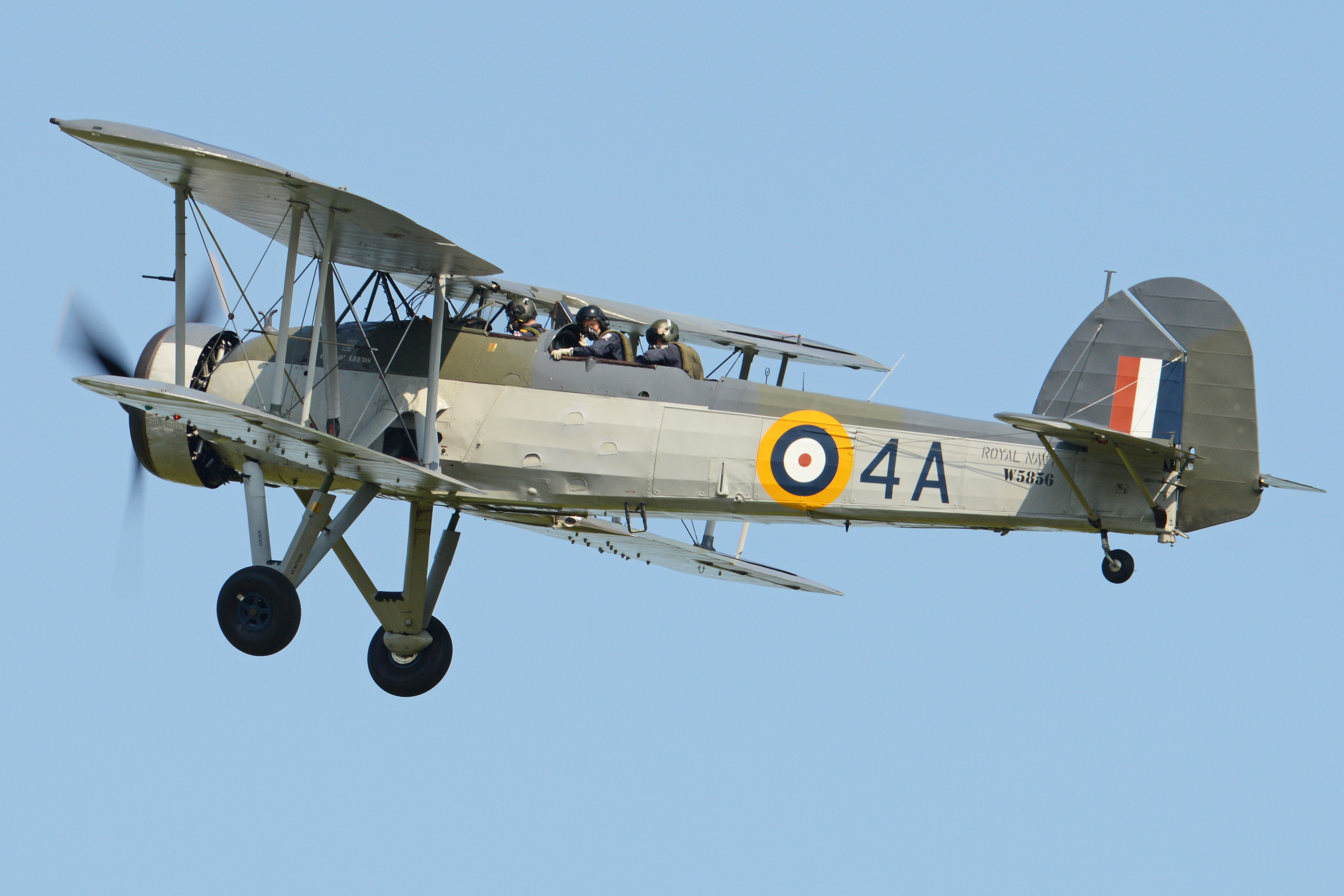
The Fairey Swordfish was the most-used aircraft at RNAS Inskip

The following major units were based at RNAS Inskip:

- 735 Naval Air Squadron formed here on 1 August 1943, staying here until 18 March 1944. The unit flew the Fairey Swordfish I & II and the Avro Anson I
- 737 Naval Air Squadron reformed here on 15 March 1944, staying until 28 August 1944. The unit flew Swordfish and Anson
- 747 Naval Air Squadron between 9 June 1943 and 26 January 1944 using the Fairey Albacore, Anson, Fairey Barracuda, Swordfish and Supermarine Walrus
- 760 Naval Air Squadron reformed here on 1 May 1944, staying until 1 November 1944 when the squadron was disbanded. It flew the Hawker Sea Hurricane IIc
- A detachment of 762 Naval Air Squadron from 20 June 1945 with the Airspeed Oxford
- 763 Naval Air Squadron reformed here on 14 April 1944, staying until 31 July 1945 when the squadron was disbanded. It flew the Grumman Avenger, Anson and Swordfish
- 766 Naval Air Squadron between 7 July 1943 and 20 January 1945 as part of No. 1 Naval Operational Training Unit flying Swordfish, Albacore, Fulmar, Anson, Boulton Paul Defiant, Sea Hurricane IIC, Firefly, Oxford and Miles Master
- 'Z' Flight of 787 Naval Air Squadron between 16 November 1943 and 14 January 1944 with the Swordfish, Fulmar I and Sea Hurricane
- 811 Naval Air Squadron between 12 December 1944 and 12 January 1944 with the Swordfish and the Grumman Wildcat
- 813 Naval Air Squadron between 20 January and 15 February 1944 with the Swordfish
- 816 Naval Air Squadron between 11 August and 11 October 1945 with the Firefly
- 819 Naval Air Squadron between 27 September and 15 October 1943 with the Swordfish and the Wildcat
- 825 Naval Air Squadron between 14 November and 18 December 1943 with the Swordfish and Sea Hurricane IIc
- 828 Naval Air Squadron between 10 February and 5 March 1945 with the Avenger
- 838 Naval Air Squadron between 6 February and 18 March 1944 with the Swordfish
- 1791 Naval Air Squadron between 19 April and 18 June 1945 with the Firefly
- 1792 Naval Air Squadron between 15 June and 29 August 1945 with the Firefly INF

== Subsequent use ==
The airfield closed for flying in February 1946, and was decommissioned on 2 July that year, but the Navy kept it as a transport pool and storage depot. The RAF used the runways for driver training, and some hangars were used by British Nuclear Fuels Ltd for secure storage until 1994.

The runways were demolished in 1974 and the concrete from them was used in the construction of the nearby M55 motorway. The hangars were demolished in the 1980s and 90s, and the Navy finally left the site on 8 March 1995. Most of the taxiways, along with the original control tower, survive as evidence of the airfield's existence, and an entrance to part of the site, now a small industrial park, is named Nightjar Way.

Sea Cadet Training Centre (SCTC) Inskip, a national training centre for the Sea Cadet Corps, was situated on the site until its closure on 31 January 2010.

In January 2012 the former SCTC reopened as the Inskip Cadet Centre and became the home of Cumbria & Lancashire Wing, Air Training Corps. The Wing headquarters offices are situated in the old control tower.

=== Transmitter station ===
On 12 January 1959 the site opened as RN Wireless Station, Inskip. Around 90 radio masts and aerials were erected, including four masts of 600 feet (180 m) height, which remain notable features into the 2020s, illuminated by red warning lights and visible from a great distance. An accommodation block was built as an extension to the control tower. The site was commissioned in 1966 as HMS Inskip.

In the 1980s there were Marconi 50 kW transmitters operating in the Very Low Frequency (VLF) band, transmitting Morse code to ships close to the United Kingdom.

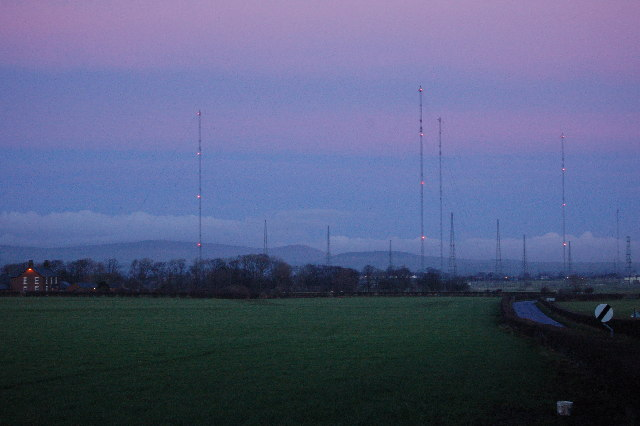
Stanley Farm (on the left) and the radio masts at DCSA Inskip, with the Bowland Fells in the background

For long distance work, the shortwave bands were used, again transmitting Morse to ships mostly based on Marconi transmitters, typically 10 kW or less. The same information would be transmitted on different frequencies and it was the ship's responsibility to find the correct frequency to monitor. This was because of the different propagation characteristics of the various frequencies used.

The site is home to a high frequency transmitter station which prior to 2003 was operated by the Royal Navy. From 1998 to 2007 it was part of the Ministry of Defence (MoD) Defence High Frequency Communications Service (DHFCS), itself part of the Defence Communication Services Agency (DCSA) and was known as DCSA Inskip. The DCSA was disestablished in 2007, and the station is now operated by Babcock International Group on behalf of the MoD. According to the sign on the gate it is now known as MOD Inskip.
