= 732 Naval Air Squadron =

Inactive flying squadron of the Royal Navy's Fleet Air Arm

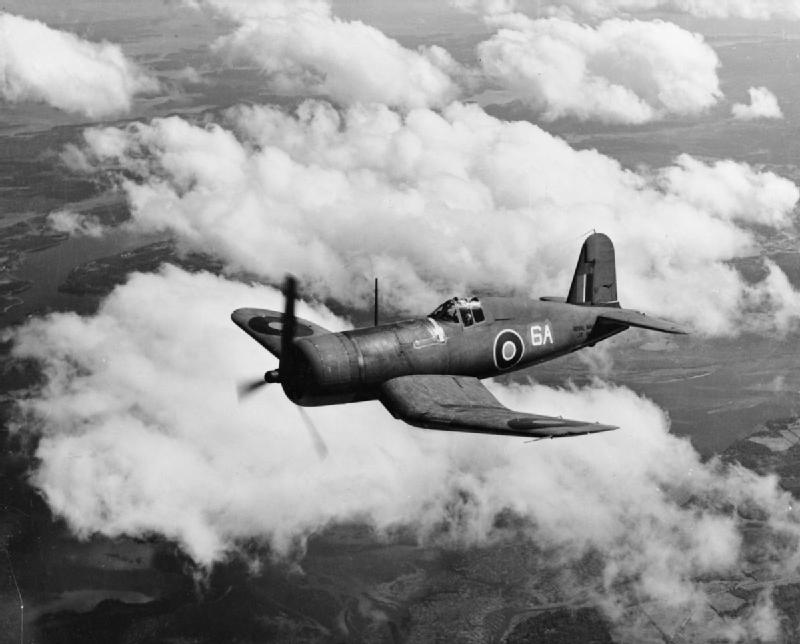
- Vought Corsair; an example of the type used by 732 NAS
- Active: 1943–1944; 1945
- Disbanded: 7 November 1945
- Country: United Kingdom
- Branch: Royal Navy
- Type: Fleet Air Arm Second Line Squadron
- Role: Operational Training Unit (OTU); Night Fighter Training Squadron
- Size: Squadron
- Part of: Fleet Air Arm
- Home station: RN Air Section Brunswick; RNAS Drem (HMS Nighthawk)

Commanders
- Notable commanders: Lieutenant Commander Mike Tritton, DSC, RNVR

Insignia
- Identification Markings: 5A+ (Corsair); D2A+ (Hellcat)

Aircraft flown
- Fighter: Vought Corsair; Fairey Firefly; Grumman Hellcat
- Trainer: Avro Anson; North American Harvard

732 Naval Air Squadron (732 NAS) was a Fleet Air Arm (FAA) naval air squadron of the United Kingdom’s Royal Navy (RN). It was initially formed in 1943 from a requirement for an Operational Training Unit for United States trained FAA pilots flying Vought Corsair fighter-bomber aircraft, at RN Air Section Brunswick, USNAS Brunswick, Maine, United States, and disbanded during 1944. In 1945 it was reformed for a brief period, as a Night Fighter Training Squadron, operating out of HMS Nighhawk, RNAS Drem, East Lothian, Scotland. Notably equipped with six Avro Anson 'flying classrooms', amongst other aircraft.

== History ==
=== Operational Training Unit (1943–1944) ===
732 Naval Air Squadron was formed from the remnants of 1835 Naval Air Squadron, on the 23 November 1943, following the latter's disbandment on the same date, at RN Air Section Brunswick, at USNAS Brunswick, located 2 miles (3.2 km) southeast of Brunswick, Maine, United States.

There was a requirement to form a Fleet Air Arm, second-line, Operational Training Unit (OTU) at Brunswick, specifically for the Vought Corsair, an American carrier-based fighter-bomber aircraft. The unit's main role was to provide training for FAA fighter pilots who had received their initial and advanced training at United States Navy airbases. Having completed its purpose, 732 Naval Air Squadron disbanded at RN Air Section Brunswick, on 1 July 1944.

=== Night Fighter Training Squadron (1945) ===
732 Naval Air Squadron reformed at RNAS Drem (HMS Nighthawk), just north of the village of Drem in East Lothian, Scotland, as a Night Fighter Training Squadron, on the 15 May 1945. RNAS Drem was home to the Fleet Air Arm's, Naval Night Fighter School and Night Fighter Direction Centre. Here, the squadron operated six Avro Anson, a multi-role training aircraft, which were fitted out as classrooms, along with six North American Harvard advanced trainer aircraft, nine Grumman Hellcat fighter aircraft and a number of Fairey Firefly NF.Mk I, night fighter variant of the fighter and anti-submarine aircraft. Roughly six months later, on the 7 November 1945, the squadron disbanded whilst at RNAS Drem, becoming ‘B’ flight of 784 Naval Air Squadron, another Night Fighter Training Squadron.

== Aircraft flown ==
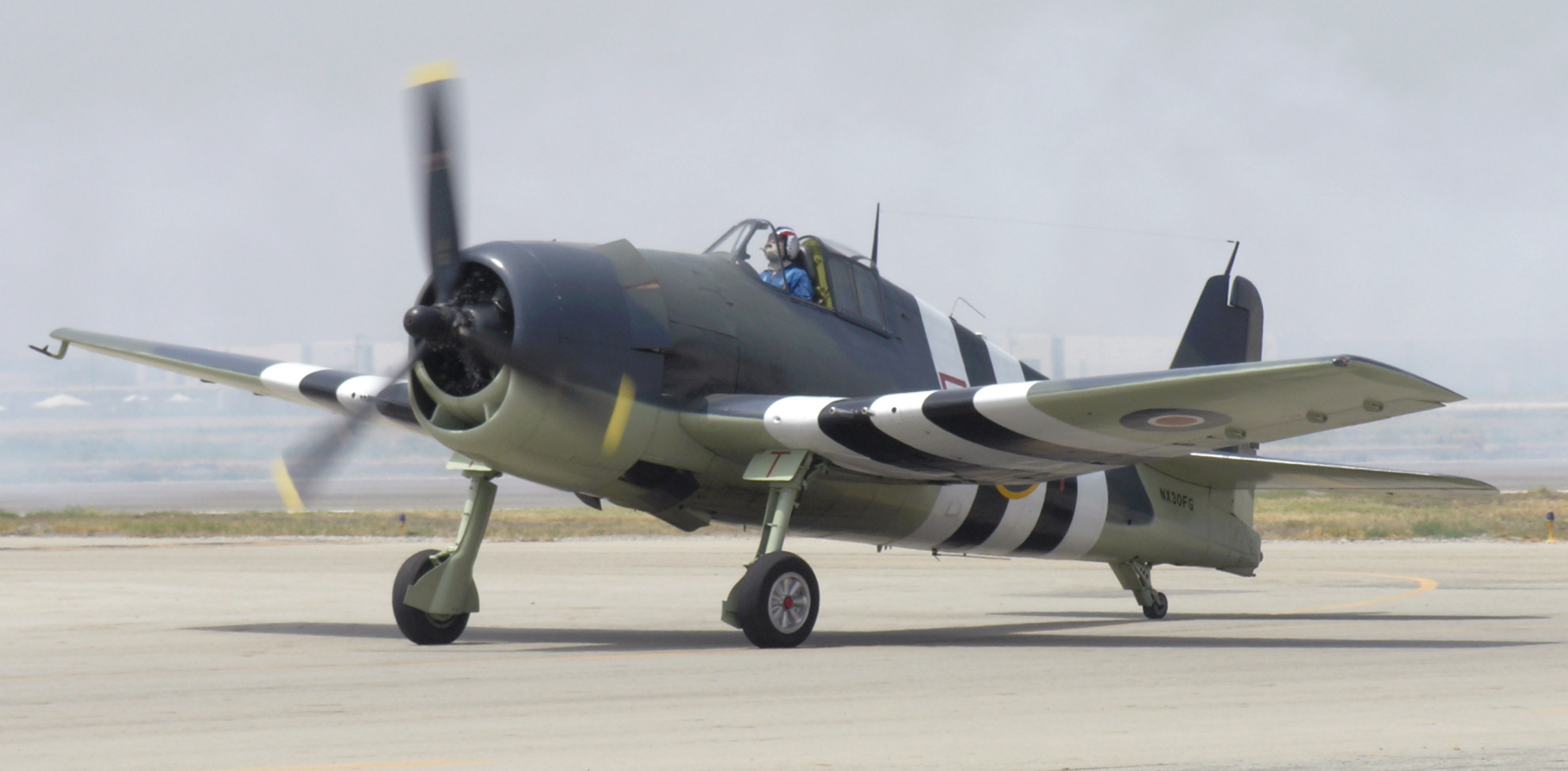
Grumman F6F Hellcat, in FAA markings, an example of the type used by 732 NAS

732 Naval Air Squadron operated two marks of Corsair during 1944 as an OTU at Brunswick. In 1945, at HMS Nighthawk, RNAS Drem, the squadron operated multiple types of other Fleet Air Arm aircraft:

- Vought Corsair Mk.I carrier-based fighter bomber (November 1943-July 1944)
- Vought Corsair Mk.II carrier-based fighter bomber (November 1943-July 1944)
- Avro Anson Mk I twin-engine, multi-role training aircraft (May - November 1945)
- North American Harvard III single-engined advanced trainer aircraft (May - November 1945)
- Grumman Hellcat N.F. Mk II carrier-based night fighter aircraft (May - November 1945)
- Fairey Firefly NF.Mk I carrier-borne night fighter and anti-submarine aircraft (1945)

== Naval air stations ==
732 Naval Air Squadron operated from a couple of naval air stations of the Royal Navy, in the United States and Scotland:

1943 - 1944

- Royal Naval Air Station Brunswick, Maine, (23 November 1943 - 1 July 1944)
- disbanded - (1 July 1944)

1945

- Royal Naval Air Station Drem (HMS Nighthawk), East Lothian, (15 May 1945 - 7 November 1945)
- disbanded - (7 November 1945)

== Commanding officers ==
List of commanding officers of 732 Naval Air Squadron with date of appointment:

1943 - 1944

- Lieutenant Commander(A) M.S. Goodson, RNVR, from 23 November 1943
- Lieutenant Commander W.N. Waller, RN, from 31 January 1944
- disbanded - 1 July 1944

1945

- Lieutenant(A) M.B.W. Howell, RNVR, 15 May 1945
- Lieutenant Commander(A) A.M. Tritton, DSC, RNVR, from 1 August 1945
- disbanded - 7 November 1945

Note: Abbreviation (A) signifies Air Branch of the RN or RNVR.
