= 735 Naval Air Squadron =

Inactive flying squadron of the Royal Navy's Fleet Air Arm

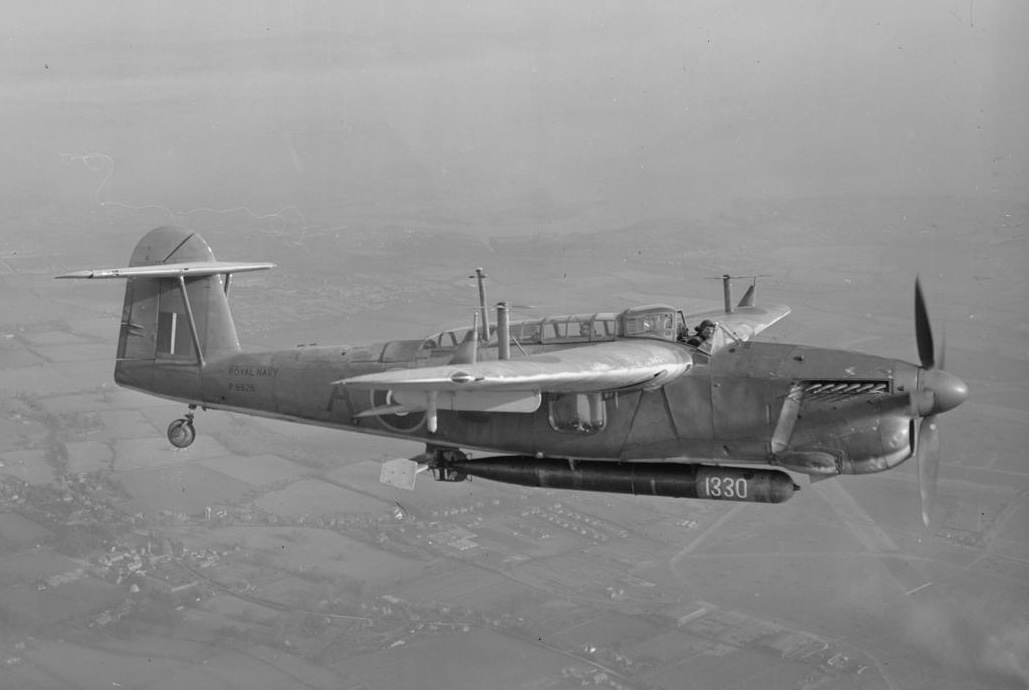
- Fairey Barracuda Mk II; an example of the type used by 735 Squadron
- Active: 1943–1946
- Disbanded: 30 April 1946
- Country: United Kingdom
- Branch: Royal Navy
- Type: Fleet Air Arm Second Line Squadron
- Role: ASV Training Unit
- Size: Squadron
- Part of: Fleet Air Arm
- Home station: RNAS Inskip; RNAS Burscough

Commanders
- Notable commanders: Captain Fred Stovin-Bradford CBE, DSC & Bar

Insignia
- Identification Markings: unknown (Swordfish); O4A+, later AH4A+ (Barracuda); O7+, later AH7A+ (Anson); AH4A+ (Hellcat)

Aircraft flown
- Attack: Fairey Swordfish; Fairey Barracuda
- Bomber: Vickers Wellington
- Fighter: Grumman Hellcat
- Trainer: Avro Anson

735 Naval Air Squadron (735 NAS) was a Fleet Air Arm (FAA) naval air squadron of the United Kingdom’s Royal Navy (RN). It was active from 1943 as an ASV Radar Training Unit. Forming at HMS Nightjar, at RNAS Inskip, Lancashire, in 1944 the squadron moved to HMS Ringtail, RNAS Burscough, also in Lancashire. Various flights from the squadron moved on to form other Naval Air Squadrons, with the squadron eventually disbanding in 1946.

== History ==
=== ASV Training Unit (1943–1946) ===
735 Naval Air Squadron was formed at RNAS Inskip (HMS Nightjar), located near the village of Inskip, Lancashire, England, on the 1 August 1943, as an air-to-surface-vessel (ASV) radar training unit and remained there until the 18 March 1944. The squadron flew Fairey Swordfish I & II, a biplane torpedo bomber, and Avro Anson Mk.I, a multi-role training aircraft. The Avro Ansons were used for both ASH (Airborne to Surface Homing) and ASV radar training. 735 Naval Air Squadron originally comprised two Flights, ‘A’ Flight being concerned with radar training and ‘B’ Flight engaged in radar trials.

The squadron moved to RNAS Burscough (HMS Ringtail), located 1.5 miles (2.4 km) southwest of Burscough, Lancashire, losing the Fairey Swordfish but gaining Fairey Barracuda Mk II & Mk III, a carrier-borne torpedo and dive bomber aircraft. 735 Naval Air Squadron also operated a detachment out of RNAS Arbroath (HMS Condor), located near Arbroath in East Angus, Scotland, between the 28 August 1944 and the 15 April 1945, when it also flew Grumman Hellcat F. Mk. I, an American carrier-based fighter aircraft, in the last year of World War Two, before returning to RNAS Burscough.

‘C’ Flight was added, which acted as a mobile unit giving Rebecca short-range radio navigation system training to fighter pilots. This was equipped with three Grumman Hellcat F. Mk. I and a single Avro Anson Mk I aircraft.

In February 1945 ‘B’ Flight broke away and became 707 Naval Air Squadron. The following month ‘C’ flight became 787X Flight at RAF Odiham, Hampshire, England.

735 Naval Air Squadron remained at RNAS Burscough after World War Two, continuing to operate Avro Anson and Fairey Barracuda aircraft. In November 1945, 737 Naval Air Squadron was absorbed into the squadron, however, on the 30 April 1946, 735 Naval Air Squadron disbanded.

== Aircraft flown ==
The squadron has flown a number of different aircraft types, including:

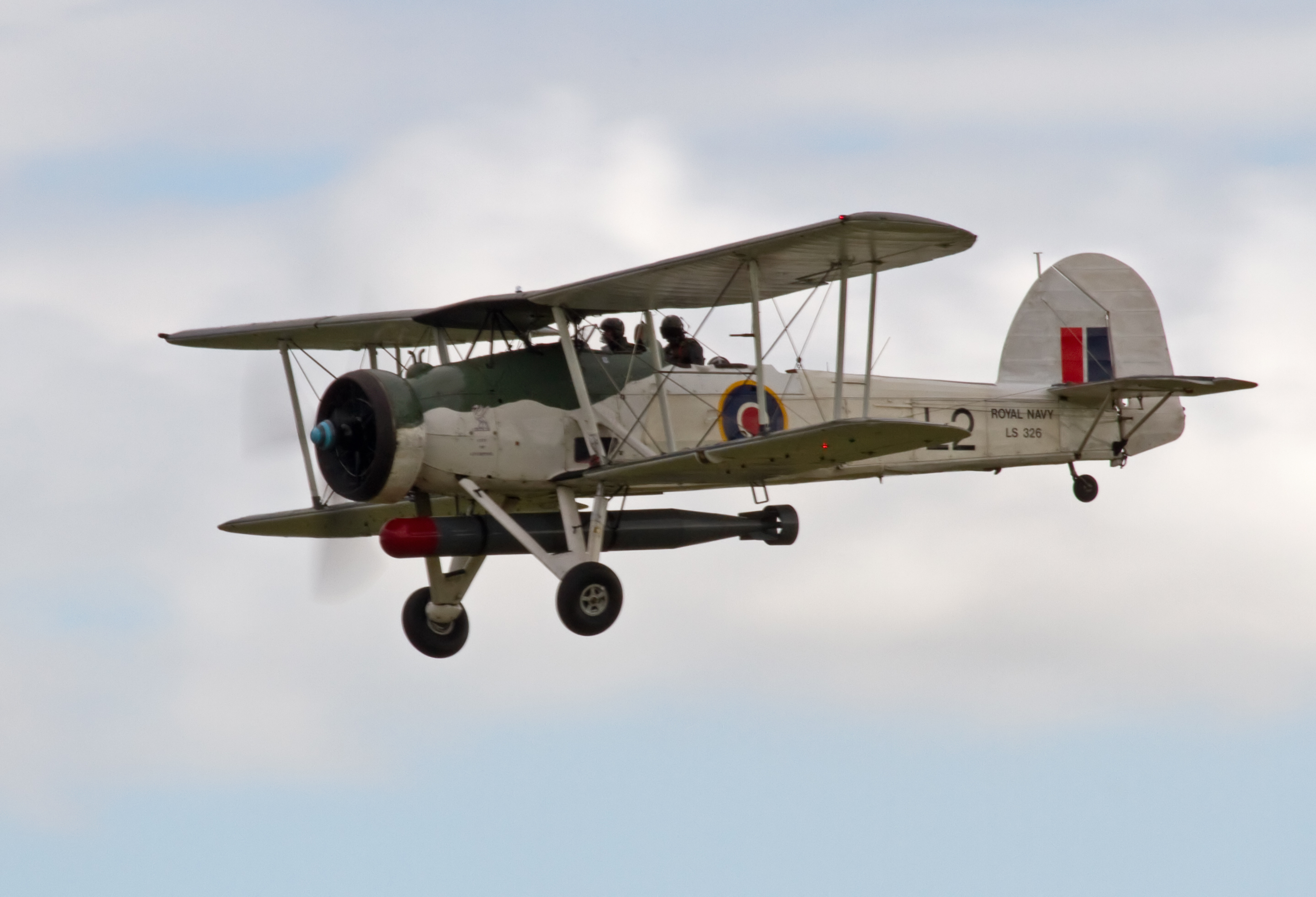
Fairey Swordfish

- Fairey Swordfish I torpedo bomber (August 1943 - March 1944)
- Fairey Swordfish II torpedo bomber (August 1943 - June 1944)
- Avro Anson Mk I multi-role training aircraft (August 1943 - April 1946)
- Vickers Wellington GR Mark XI reconnaissance, anti-submarine and anti-shipping aircraft (February 1944)
- Fairey Barracuda Mk II torpedo and dive bomber (December 1944-April 1946)
- Fairey Barracuda Mk III torpedo and dive bomber (November 1945 - April 1946)
- Grumman Hellcat F. Mk. I fighter aircraft ( - May 1945)

== Naval air stations ==
735 Naval Air Squadron operated from a number of naval air stations of the Royal Navy, in the United Kingdom:

- Royal Naval Air Station Inskip (HMS Nightjar), Lancashire, (1 August 1943 - 18 March 1944)
- Royal Naval Air Station Burscough (HMS Ringtail), Lancashire, (18 March 1944 - 30 April 1946)
  - Royal Naval Air Station Arbroath (HMS Condor), Angus, (Detachment 28 August 1944 - 15 April 1945)
- disbanded - (30 April 1946)

== Commanding officers ==
List of commanding officers of 735 Naval Air Squadron with date of appointment:

- Lieutenant Commander E.S. Carver, DSC, RN, from 1 August 1943
- Lieutenant Commander(A) R.T. Hayes, RNVR, from 15 March 1944
- Lieutenant Commander(A) J.H. Mayne, RNVR, from 18 August 1944
- Lieutenant Commander(A) S.L. Revett, DSC, RNVR, from 31 March 1945
- Lieutenant Commander F. Stovin-Bradford, DSC, RN, from 28 December 1945
- disbanded - 30 April 1946

Note: Abbreviation (A) signifies Air Branch of the RN or RNVR.
