= 784 Naval Air Squadron =

Inactive flying squadron of the Royal Navy's Fleet Air Arm

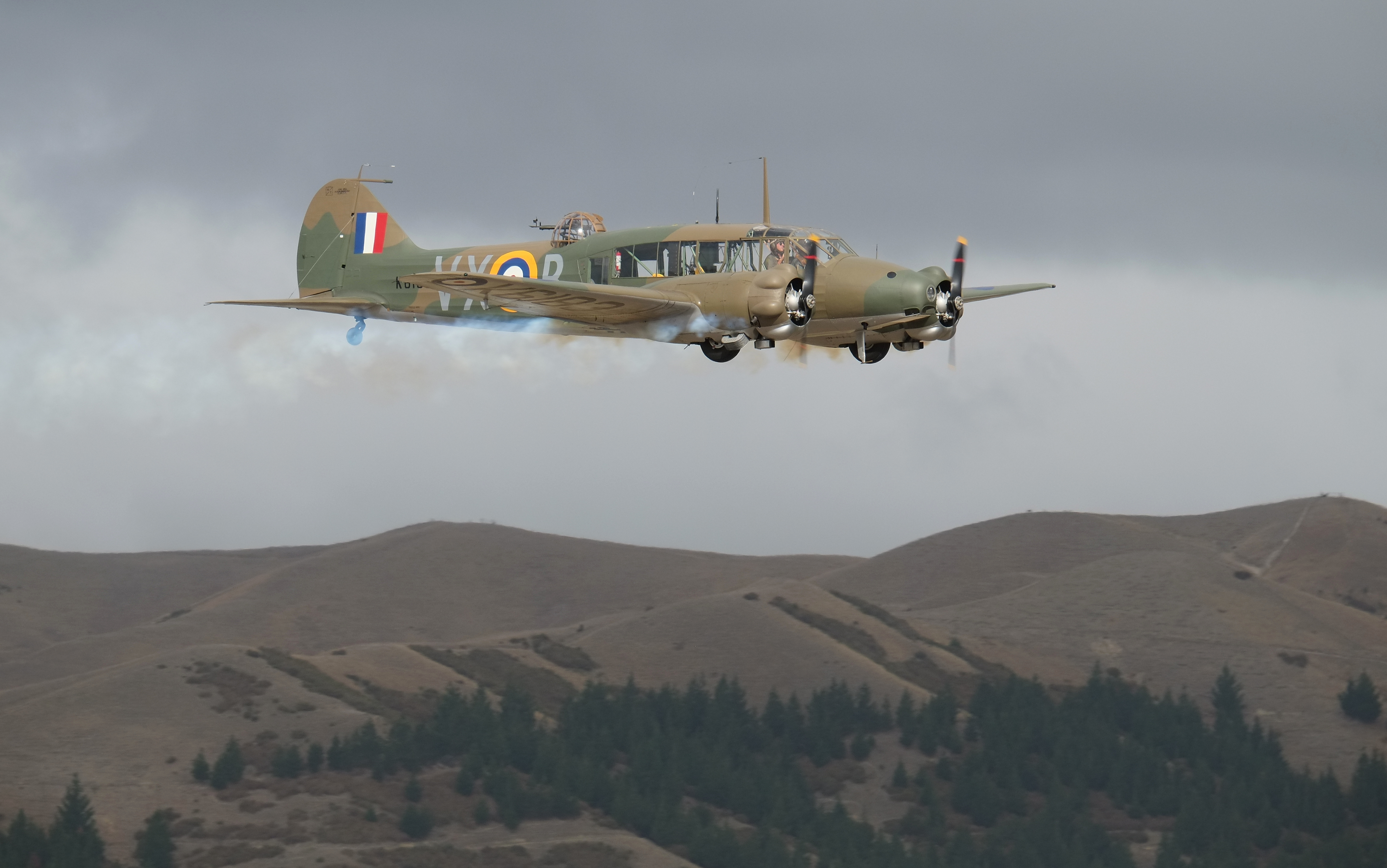
- Avro Anson Mk I; an example of the type used by 784 NAS
- Active: 1942–1946
- Disbanded: 10 September 1946
- Country: United Kingdom
- Branch: Royal Navy
- Type: Fleet Air Arm Second Line Squadron
- Role: Night Fighter Training Squadron
- Size: Squadron
- Part of: Fleet Air Arm
- Home station: See Naval air stations section for full list.
- Mottos: Illumina tenebras (Latin for 'Lighten our darkness')
- Aircraft: See Aircraft flown section for full list.

Insignia
- Squadron Badge: Black, base wavy of eight white and blue a bat gold breathing flames of fire proper issuant a torch gold inflamed proper (1943)
- Identification Markings: A0A+ (October 1942); B0AA+ (1943 - 1945); D1A+ to D3A+ & D5A+ (1945); P8A+ (1946)

784 Naval Air Squadron (784 NAS), also called 784 Squadron, is an inactive Fleet Air Arm (FAA) naval air squadron of the United Kingdom’s Royal Navy (RN) which was last operational as a Night Fighter Training Squadron at RNAS Brawdy, Pembrokeshire, with Fairey Firefly NF.Mk I night fighter and Grumman Hellcat N.F. Mk II night fighter and disbanded in the autumn of 1946.

The squadron had formed at RNAS Lee-on-Solent, Hampshire, in June 1942, moving to RNAS Drem, East Lothian, in October 1942. Squadron personnel were also detached to the Naval Air Radio Installation Unit at RAF Christchurch, Dorsett, in 1943 and in the same year, a number of crews were attached to RAF night fighter squadrons, with two officers gained Distinguished Flying Crosses. In 1944, three squadron Flights were attached for service to each of 813, 825 and 835 Naval Air Squadrons, embarked in the escort carriers HMS Campania, HMS Vindex, and HMS Nairana respectively, on convoy protection duties. At the beginning of 1946 the squadron moved to Pembrokeshire, Wales, operating out of RNAS Brawdy.

== History ==
=== Night Fighter Training Squadron (1942–1946) ===
784 Naval Air Squadron formed at RNAS Lee-on-Solent (HMS Daedalus), in Hampshire, on 1 June 1942, as a Night Fighter Training squadron. It was initially equipped with six Fairey Fulmar, a British carrier-borne reconnaissance and fighter aircraft and two Vought Chesapeake, an American dive bomber. More Fairey Fulmar arrived later, along with Avro Anson, the latter from August 1942, a multirole aircraft but primarily used as a trainer, and these particular aircraft were equipped as aircraft interception (AI) radar classrooms.

On 18 October 1942 the squadron relocated to RNAS Drem (HMS Nighthawk), in East Lothian, Scotland, and the following year saw some squadron personnel detached to RAF Christchurch, in Dorset, England, to support the Naval Air Radio Installation Unit. Later in 1943 some of the squadron’s pilots saw service with No. 29 Squadron RAF, undertaking night fighting operations, with in particular, Lieutenant D.R.O. Price, RNVR, and Sub-lieutenant R.E. Armitage, RNVR, awarded DFCs for their actions.

In 1944, 784 NAS provided three Flights, each consisting three Fairey Fulmar aircraft, to support with fighter cover on convoy protection duties. One Flight was attached to 813 Naval Air Squadron for service embarked in the Nairana-class escort carrier HMS Campania, the second Flight was attached to 825 Naval Air Squadron embarked in another Nairana-class escort carrier HMS Vindex, and the third Flight was attached to 835 Naval Air Squadron embarked in the lead ship of her class HMS Nairana. During September 1944 the squadron received Fairey Firefly NF.Mk I, the night fighter variant of the carrier-borne fighter and anti-submarine aircraft, these aircraft were used in the Air Intercept role and were equipped with the American ASH radar.

November 1945 saw the formation of a ‘B’ Flight, out of the disbanded 732 Naval Air Squadron, and this operated with Grumman Hellcat N.F. Mk II, the night fighter variant of the American fighter aircraft and North American Harvard, an American advanced trainer aircraft. 784 NAS moved again on 15 January 1946, relocating to RNAS Dale (HMS Goldcrest), in Pembrokeshire, Wales, however, the squadron primarily operated out of RNAS Dale’s satellite, RNAS Brawdy (HMS Goldcrest II) where the squadron eventually disbanded, becoming 'B' Flight of 790 Naval Air Squadron on 10 September 1946.

== Aircraft flown ==
The squadron operated a number of different aircraft types, including:

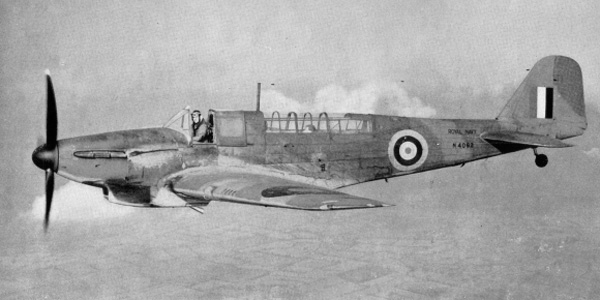
Fairey Fulmar Mk.I

- Vought Chesapeake Mk.I dive bomber (May 1942 - August 1943)
- Percival Proctor lA radio trainer/communications aircraft (May 1942 - September 1943)
- Fairey Fulmar Mk.I reconnaissance/fighter aircraft (May 1942 - November 1943)
- Fairey Fulmar NF Mk.II night fighter aircraft (May 1942 - November 1944)
- Avro Anson Mk I multirole aircraft (August 1942 - September 1946)
- Stinson Reliant liaison and training aircraft (September 1943 - August 1944)
- Hawker Hurricane Mk.IIC fighter aircraft (July 1944)
- Fairey Firefly NF.Mk I fighter and anti-submarine aircraft (September 1944 - September 1946)
- North American Harvard III advanced trainer aircraft (November 1945 - July 1946)
- Grumman Hellcat N.F. Mk II night fighter (November 1945 - September 1946)

== Naval air stations and aircraft carriers ==
784 Naval Air Squadron operated from a number of naval air stations of the Royal Navy, both in the UK and overseas and a number of Royal Navy escort aircraft carriers:

- Royal Naval Air Station Lee-on-Solent (HMS Daedalus), Hampshire, (1 June 1942 - 18 October 1942)
- Royal Naval Air Station Drem (HMS Nighthawk), East Lothian, (18 October 1942 - 15 January 1946)
  - 'B1' Flight:
    - HMS Nairana, Nairana-class escort carrier, (attached to 835 Naval Air Squadron) (24 February - 15 March 1944)
  - 'B2' Flight:
    - Royal Naval Air Station Ballyhalbert (HMS Corncrake), County Down, (3 April 1944 - 15 April 1944)
    - HMS Vindex, Nairana-class escort carrier, (attached to 825 Naval Air Squadron) (15 April 1944 - 23 April 1943)
    - disembarked - (23 April 1944)
  - 'B3' Flight:
    - HMS Campania, Nairana-class escort carrier, (attached to 813 Naval Air Squadron) (13 March 1944 - 3 April 1944)
    - Royal Naval Air Station Ballyhalbert (HMS Corncrake), County Down, (3 April 1944 - 26 April 1944)
    - HMS Ravager, Attacker-class escort carrier, (Detachment two aircraft 9 - 16 April 1944)
    - HMS Campania, Nairana-class escort carrier, (26 April 1944 - 21 July 1944)
    - Royal Naval Air Station Drem (HMS Nighthawk), East Lothian, (21 July 1944 - 3 August 1944)
    - HMS Campania, Nairana-class escort carrier, (3 August 1944 - 18 August 1944)
    - Royal Naval Air Station Drem (HMS Nighthawk), East Lothian, (18 August 1944 - 6 September 1944)
    - HMS Campania, Nairana-class escort carrier, (6 September 1944 - 1 March 1945)
    - Royal Naval Air Station Machrihanish (HMS Landrail), Argyll and Bute, - disbanded (1 March 1945)
  - Royal Naval Air Station Donibristle (HMS Merlin), Fife, (Detachment 28 April 1944 - 20 April 1945)
  - Royal Naval Air Station Burscough (HMS Ringtail), Lancashire, (Detachment 18 August 1945)
- Royal Naval Air Station Dale (HMS Goldcrest), Pembrokeshire, (satellite Royal Naval Air Station Brawdy (HMS Goldcrest II), Pembrokeshire) (15 January 1946 - 10 September 1946)
- disbanded - (10 September 1946)

== Commanding officers ==
List of commanding officers of 784 Naval Air Squadron with date of appointment:

- Captain L.A. Harris, DSC, RM, from 1 June 1942
- Lieutenant Commander P.N. Humphreys, GC, RN, from 1 December 1942
- Lieutenant Commander(A) J.E.M. Hoare, RCNVR, from 10 September 1943
- Lieutenant Commander R.O. Davies, RN, from 18 January 1944
- Lieutenant Commander(A) P.R.V. Wheeler, RNVR, from 3 September 1944
- Lieutenant Commander(A) G.E. Fenner, RNVR, from 9 April 1945
- Lieutenant Commander(A) G.L. Davies, DSC, RNVR, from 30 January 1946
- Major J.O. Armour, RM, from 1 June 1946
- Lieutenant(A) E.S. Griffiths, RN, from 30 August 1946
- disbanded - 10 September 1946

Note: Abbreviation (A) signifies Air Branch of the RN or RNVR.
