= RAF Drem =

Former Royal Air Force station in East Lothian, Scotland

RAF Drem RNAS Drem HMS Nighthawk
- West Fenton Aerodrome; Gullane Aerodrome
- Drem, East Lothian in Scotland

Site information
- Type: Royal Air Force station
- Code: DE
- Owner: Air Ministry; Admiralty
- Operator: Royal Flying Corps; Royal Air Force; Royal Navy
- Controlled by: RAF Flying Training Command (1939); RAF Fighter Command (1939 - 1945) * No. 13 Group RAF; Fleet Air Arm (1942 - 1946) *lodger unit (1942 - 1945)
- Condition: Disused

Location
- Shown within East Lothian RAF Drem (the United Kingdom)
- Coordinates: 56.022°N 2.794°W

Site history
- Built: 1917
- In use: 1917 - March 1946
- Fate: Farmland / Industry / Museum
- Battles/wars: First World War; European theatre of World War II

Airfield information
- Elevation: 11 metres (36 ft) AMSL
Runways
Direction	Length and surface
00/00	Grass
00/00	Grass
00/00	Grass

Royal Air Force Drem, or more simply RAF Drem, is a former Royal Air Force station, just north of the village of Drem in East Lothian, Scotland. The motto of the station was Exiit Hinc Lumen which means "From here went Forth the Light".

== History ==
The foundation of Drem as an airfield, precedes the creation of the Royal Air Force (RAF) as by 1916, an airfield had been established under the name West Fenton Aerodrome. From 1916 to 1917, No. 77 Home Defence Squadron, Royal Flying Corps operated from Drem and in April 1918, No. 2 Training Depot Station opened.

Between April and 14 August 1918, the American 41st Aero Squadron under the command of Lieutenant Warren C. Woodward was temporarily located at Drem together with an aero repair flight company. The Americans called the airfield "Gullane" in its official history. The squadron transferred to St Maixent in France and arrived at its operational airfield of Romorantin on 29 August 1918.

By November 1918, West Fenton had been renamed Gullane Aerodrome and with the post-war demobilisation the airfield was vacated in 1919. From 1933 to 1939, the airfield saw only occasional use by visiting squadrons.

It was at this time, while stationed there in 1934, that Victor Goddard had his paranormal vision of the airfield as it might appear in the then future 1939.

In 1939, the grass airstrip was resurfaced, and the unit was renamed RAF Drem. The station was then home to No. 13 Flying Training School.

Following the outbreak of the Second World War, RAF Drem became an air defence fighter unit for the city of Edinburgh and the shipping area around the Firth of Forth, with Supermarine Spitfire of 602 Squadron posted to Drem.

On 16 October 1939, the Luftwaffe made its first attack on Great Britain. Junkers Ju 88s of 1/KG 30 led by Hauptmann Helmuth Pohle attacked British warships in the Firth of Forth. Spitfires from 603 Squadron (City of Edinburgh Squadron) joined 602 Squadron aircraft in a defensive counter-air sortie. Following the destruction of a Luftwaffe bomber aircraft by a 603 Squadron Spitfire, 602 Squadron pilot Flight Lieutenant George Pinkerton gained the second kill of the Second World War.

In 1940, an airfield lighting system for night landings, the Drem Lighting System, was developed at RAF Drem.

Royal Australian Air Force 453 Squadron was re-established at Drem on 18 June 1942, equipped with Supermarine Spitfire aircraft, and joined the RAF's Fighter Command.

=== Royal Navy ===
In 1942, a request for lodger facilities for the Royal Navy at RAF Drem was granted and Royal Naval Air Section Drem became home to 784 Night Fighter Training Squadron. On 21 April 1945 the airbase was transferred from No. 13 Group, on loan to the Admiralty, known as Royal Naval Air Station Drem, more commonly RNAS Drem; (and commissioned HMS Nighthawk). Its primary role was Naval Night Fighter School and Night Fighter Direction Centre. 770 Fleet Requirements Unit had moved from RNAS Dunino in July 1944 and in May 1945 732 Night Fighter Training School formed at RNAS Drem. A number of Fleet Air Arm squadrons used the airbase when disembarking from aircraft carrier operations between 1943 and 1945. March 1946 saw the airfield transfer back into RAF control, and the unit was returned to the Air Ministry although it was closed and then decommissioned not long after that.

== Units and aircraft ==
Unit	From	To	Aircraft	Version	Notes
No. 77 Squadron RFC	1916	1917	Royal Aircraft Factory B.E.2; Royal Aircraft Factory B.E.12		Squadron headquartered in Edinburgh. West Fenton was one of various landing grounds used.
41st Aero Squadron, US Army	April 1918	August 1918	SPAD S.VII; Sopwith Camel		
RAF No. 2 Training Depot Station	15 April 1918	1919	Sopwith Pup; Sopwith Camel; Royal Aircraft Factory S.E.5		
No. 151 Squadron RAF	21 February 1919	10 September 1919			Cadre, no aircraft allocated
No. 152 Squadron RAF	21 February 1919	30 June 1919			Cadre, no aircraft allocated
No. 13 Flying Training School RAF	17 March 1939	3 September 1939	Airspeed Oxford; Hawker Audax; Hawker Hart		
No. 13 Service Flying Training School RAF	3 September 1939	27 October 1939	Airspeed Oxford; Hawker Audax; Hawker Hart		
No. 602 (City of Glasgow) Squadron AAF	13 October 1939	14 April 1940	Supermarine Spitfire	Mk.I	
No. 609 (West Riding) Squadron AAF	17 October 1939	5 December 1939	Supermarine Spitfire	Mk.I	
No. 72 Squadron RAF	1 December 1939	12 January 1940	Supermarine Spitfire	Mk.I	
No. 111 Squadron RAF	7 December 1939	27 February 1940	Hawker Hurricane	Mk.I	
No. 609 (West Riding) Squadron AAF	10 January 1940	20 May 1940	Supermarine Spitfire	Mk.I	
No. 29 Squadron RAF	4 April 1940	10 May 1940	Bristol Blenheim	Mk.IF	
No. 603 (City of Edinburgh) Squadron AAF	14 April 1940	5 May 1940	Supermarine Spitfire	Mk.I	
No. 245 (Northern Rhodesian) Squadron RAF	12 May 1940	5 June 1940	Hawker Hurricane	Mk.I	
No. 605 (County of Warwick) Squadron AAF	28 May 1940	7 September 1940	Hawker Hurricane	Mk.I	
No. 145 Squadron RAF	14 August 1940	31 August 1940	Hawker Hurricane	Mk.I	
No. 263 (Fellowship of the Bellows) Squadron RAF	2 September 1940	28 November 1940	Hawker Hurricane; Westland Whirlwind	Mk.I; Mk.I	Converting from Hurricane to Whirlwind
No. 111 Squadron RAF	8 September 1940	12 October 1940	Hawker Hurricane	Mk.I	
No. 141 Squadron RAF	15 October 1940	22 October 1940	Boulton Paul Defiant	Mk.I	
No. 232 Squadron RAF	24 October 1940	11 November 1940	Hawker Hurricane	Mk.I	
No. 607 (County of Durham) Squadron AAF	8 November 1940	12 December 1940	Hawker Hurricane	Mk.I	
No. 258 Squadron RAF	4 December 1940	17 December 1940	Hawker Hurricane	Mk.I	
No. 43 (China-British) Squadron RAF	12 December 1940	22 February 1941	Hawker Hurricane	Mk.I	
No. 603 (City of Edinburgh) Squadron AAF	13 December 1940	27 February 1941	Supermarine Spitfire	Mk.I	
No. 43 Squadron RAF	1 March 1941	4 October 1941	Hawker Hurricane	Mk.I, IIA & IIB	Converted to Hurricane Mk.IIA & IIB during April 1941.
No. 607 (County of Durham) Squadron AAF	2 March 1941	16 April 1941	Hawker Hurricane	Mk.I	
No. 600 (City of London) Squadron AAF	14 March 1941	27 April 1941	Bristol Blenheim; Bristol Beaufighter	Mk.IF; Mk.IF	
No. 260 Squadron RAF	16 April 1941	19 May 1941	Hawker Hurricane	Mk.I	
No. 64 Squadron RAF	17 May 1941	7 August 1941	Supermarine Spitfire	Mk.IIA	
No. 123 (East India) Squadron RAF	6 August 1941	22 September 1941	Supermarine Spitfire	Mk.I	
No. 64 Squadron RAF	4 October 1941	16 November 1941	Supermarine Spitfire	Mk.IIA	
No. 611 (West Lancashire) Squadron AAF	12 November 1941	3 June 1942	Supermarine Spitfire	Mk.IIA, IIB & VB	
No. 340 (GC IV/2 Île-de-France) Squadron RAF	20 December 1941	1 January 1942	Supermarine Spitfire	Mk.IIA	
No. 410 Squadron RCAF	6 August 1941	15 June 1942	Boulton Paul Defiant; Bristol Beaufighter	Mk.I; Mk.IIF	Converted to Beaufighter April–May 1942
No. 242 (Canadian) Squadron RAF	1 June 1942	11 August 1942	Supermarine Spitfire	Mk.VB	
No. 453 Squadron RAAF	9 June 1942	25 September 1942	Supermarine Spitfire	Mk.VB	
No. 137 Squadron RAF	2 August 1942	11 August 1942	Westland Whirlwind	Mk.I	
No. 222 (Natal) Squadron RAF	10 August 1942; 15 August 1942	21 August 1942; 22 October 1942	Supermarine Spitfire	Mk.VB	
No. 65 Squadron RAF	26 September 1942; 11 October 1942	2 October 1942; 3 January 1943	Supermarine Spitfire	Mk.VB	
784 Naval Air Squadron	18 October 1942	1 February 1946	Avro Anson; Fairey Fulmar; Fairey Firefly; Grumman Hellcat; North American Harvard		Naval night-fighter school
No. 197 Squadron RAF	25 November 1942	28 March 1943	Hawker Typhoon	Mk.IA & IB	
No. 124 (Baroda) Squadron RAF	29 December 1942	21 January 1943	Supermarine Spitfire	Mk.VI	
No. 65 (East India) Squadron RAF	10 January 1943	29 March 1943	Supermarine Spitfire	Mk.VB	
No. 186 Squadron RAF	27 April 1943	3 August 1943			Squadron reforming, no aircraft allocated
No. 340 (GC IV/2 Île-de-France) Squadron RAF	30 April 1943	9 November 1943	Supermarine Spitfire	Mk.VB	
No. 1692 (Radio Development) Flight RAF	5 July 1943	10 December 1943	Boulton Paul Defiant; Bristol Beaufighter		Radar-jamming trials
No. 130 (Punjab) Squadron RAF	30 March 1943	30 April 1943	Supermarine Spitfire	Mk.VB	
No. 488 Squadron RNZAF	3 August 1943	3 September 1943	Bristol Beaufighter de Havilland Mosquito	Mk.VIF; Mk.XII	Converting from Beaufighter to Mosquito. Previously a detachment at Drem since September 1942 (Beaufighter IIF & VIF)
No. 96 Squadron RAF	4 September 1943	8 November 1943	Bristol Beaufighter de Havilland Mosquito	Mk.VIF; Mk.XIII	Converted to Mosquito during October–November 1943
No. 281 Squadron RAF	9 October 1943	22 November 1943	Supermarine Walrus; Avro Anson	Mk.I; Mk.I	Air-sea rescue unit
No. 307 Polish Night Fighter Squadron	9 November 1943	2 March 1944	de Havilland Mosquito	Mk.II	
No. 485 Squadron RNZAF	21 November 1943	28 February 1944	Supermarine Spitfire	Mk.VB	
No. 486 Squadron RNZAF	28 February 1944	6 March 1944	Hawker Typhoon; Hawker Tempest	Mk.IB; Mk.V	Converting from Typhoon to Tempest
No. 29 Squadron RAF	1 March 1944	1 May 1944	de Havilland Mosquito	Mk.XII & XIII	Converting from Mk.XII to Mk.XIII
No. 91 (Nigeria) Squadron RAF	17 March 1944	23 April 1944	Supermarine Spitfire	Mk.XIV	
No. 309 Polish Fighter-Reconnaissance Squadron	23 April 1944	14 November 1944	Hawker Hurricane; North American Mustang	Mk.IIC; Mk. I & III	Converted to Mustang September–October 1944
770 Naval Air Squadron	16 July 1944	1 October 1945	(various)		Fleet Requirements Unit
No. 340 (GC IV/2 Île-de-France) Squadron RAF	17 December 1944	30 January 1945	Supermarine Spitfire	Mk.IXB	
722 Naval Air Squadron	15 May 1945	November 1945			Naval night-fighter school (merged into 784 Squadron November 1945)
No. 81 Squadron RAF					

(Sources:)

The following units were here at some point:

- No. 148 Airfield Headquarters RAF (1944)
- No. 2882 Squadron RAF Regiment
- No. 2885 Squadron RAF Regiment
- Radio Development Flight RAF (December 1942 - July 1943) became No. 1692 Flight
- SCR.584 Training Unit RAF (January - May 1945)

Most of the units based at Drem during the Second World War were fighter or night-fighter squadrons, which were often based at Drem for relatively short periods. This was typical of many fighter stations in Scotland and Northern England as although Luftwaffe activity in these areas was relatively limited for most of the war, they still required to be defended. Squadrons would therefore be rotated north to cover "quiet" sectors whilst also resting, absorbing replacement aircrews and/or converting to new aircraft. As the war progressed the Luftwaffe threat to Britain diminished further and surplus fighter stations could be transferred to other uses, such as (in the case of Drem) training of Fleet Air Arm crews.

In addition to the units and dates listed above, Drem also hosted detachments from various other RAF squadrons from time to time. These were mostly fighter and night-fighter units, but detachments from 278 or 281 (Air-Sea Rescue) Squadrons were also present for extended periods during 1942 and 1943.

== Current use ==
At present, the RAF Drem Museum is housed in what was RAF Drem's mess accommodation.

Various business premises occupy the rest of the accommodation section of the airfield.

Equestrian activities occupy areas of the greater airfield.

A radio controlled model flying club have a strip on the southern edge of the field just off the peritrack.
