= Fairey Firefly =

British carrier-based fighter and anti-submarine aircraft

Firefly
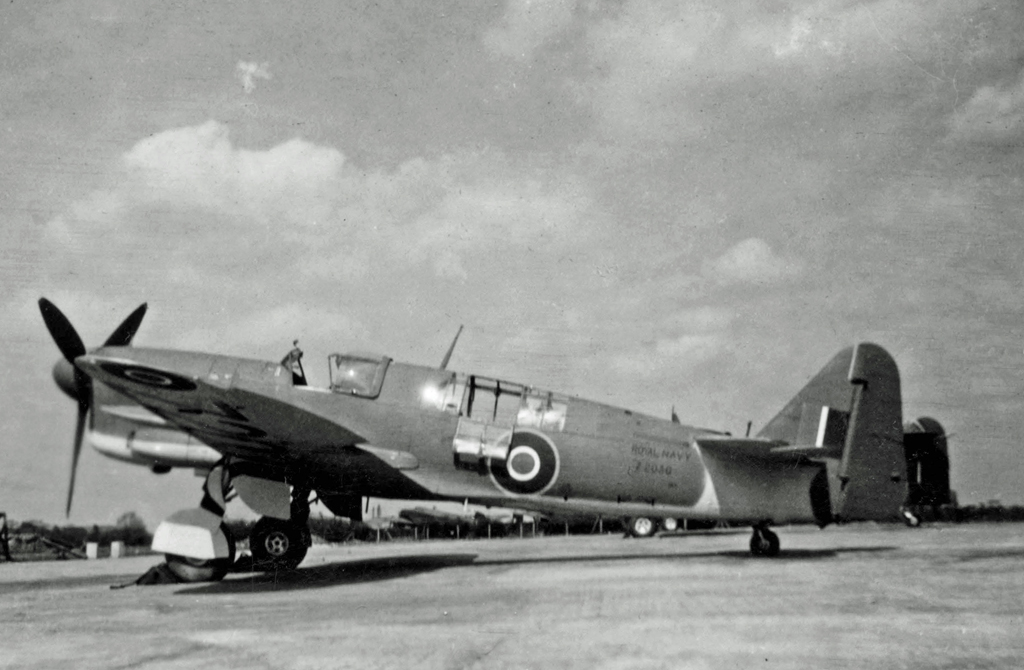
- Operational FAA Fairey Firefly FR.1 wearing late World War II camouflage

General information
- Type: Carrier-borne fighter; Strike fighter; Aerial reconnaissance
- Manufacturer: Fairey Aviation Company, Ltd.
- Status: Retired from military service
- Primary users: Royal Navy Royal Australian Navy; Royal Canadian Navy; Royal Netherlands Navy
- Number built: 1,702

History
- Manufactured: 1941–1955
- Introduction date: March 1943
- First flight: 22 December 1941
- Retired: 1956 (Royal Navy)

The Fairey Firefly is a Second World War-era carrier-borne fighter aircraft and anti-submarine aircraft that was principally operated by the Fleet Air Arm (FAA). It was developed and built by the British aircraft manufacturer Fairey Aviation Company.

Development of the Firefly can be traced back to a pair of specifications issued by the British Air Ministry in 1938, calling for new naval fighter designs. Designed to the contemporary FAA concept of a two-seat fleet reconnaissance/fighter, the pilot and observer were positioned at separate stations. In flight, the Firefly was superior in terms of both performance and firepower to its predecessor, the Fairey Fulmar. Due to a protracted development, the type only entered operational service towards the end of the conflict, at which point it was no longer competitive as a fighter. The limitations of a single engine in a relatively heavy airframe reduced its performance, but the Firefly proved to be a fairly sturdy, long-ranged, and docile aircraft during carrier operations.

The Fairey Firefly served in the Second World War as a fleet fighter. During the post-war era, it was soon superseded in the fighter role by the arrival of more modern jet aircraft, thus the Firefly was adapted to perform in other roles, including strike operations and anti-submarine warfare. In these capacities, it remained a mainstay of the FAA until the mid-1950s. Both British and Australian Fireflies routinely performed ground–attack operations from various aircraft carriers during the Korean War. In foreign service, the type was in operation with the naval air arms of Australia, Canada, India and the Netherlands. As late as 1962, Dutch Fireflies were used to carry out attack sorties against Indonesian infiltrators in Dutch New Guinea. Its final uses were in various secondary roles, such as trainers, target tugs and drone aircraft.

== Design and development ==
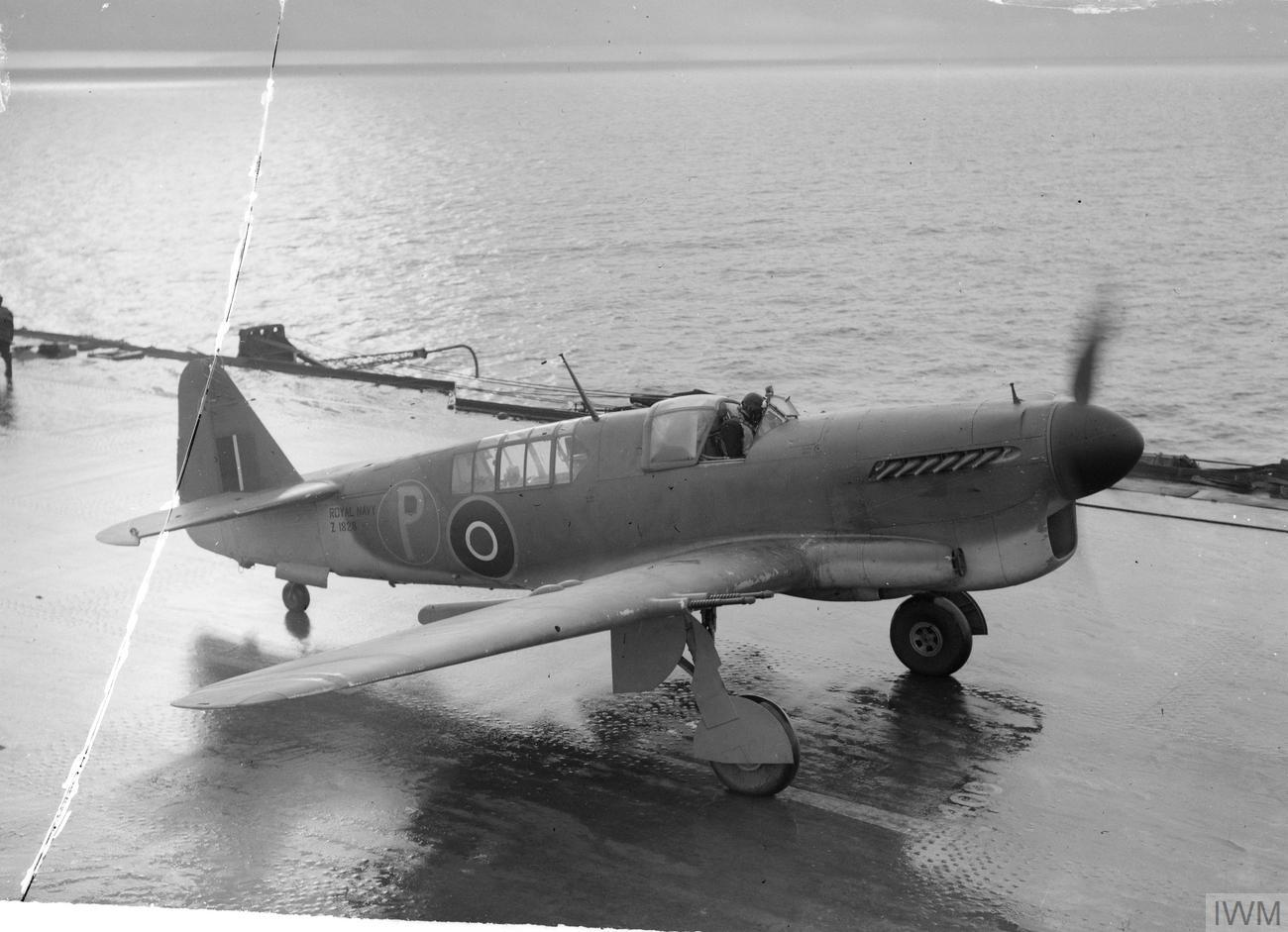
A Firefly prototype on the flight deck of HMS Illustrious on the Clyde, February 1943.

During 1938, by which point British authorities were preparing for the likelihood of a great war, the Air Ministry issued a pair of specifications calling for naval fighters, a conventional and a "turret fighter". The performance requirements for both was to be able to attain a speed of 275 kn (509 km/h; 316 mph) while flying at 15,000 ft (4,600 m) and carrying an armament, for the conventional fighter, of eight 0.303 in (7.7 mm) Browning machine guns or four 20 mm (0.79 in) Hispano cannon. This aircraft would replace the Fairey Fulmar, which had been viewed as an interim design. These specifications were updated during the following year, while several British manufacturers tendered their ideas.

Further changes to the official specification followed, such as the turret fighter specification being eliminated, while a modified specification was issued to cover single and dual-seat fighters capable of 330 and 300 kn (610 and 560 km/h; 380 and 350 mph) respectively. Fairey offered designs that could accommodate either a single or twin-seat arrangements, either powered by the Rolls-Royce Griffon engine, or combining a larger airframe with a Napier Sabre engine. After consideration of the manufacturer's responses, Specification N.5/40 replaced the earlier specifications. Due to the necessity of navigating over open sea, it was decided to opt for a two-seater aircraft alone. For defence of naval bases, a separate single seater design would lead to the Blackburn Firebrand.

The Firefly was designed by a team led by H.E. Chaplin at Fairey Aviation which reportedly used the Fulmar as a starting point. During June 1940, the Admiralty placed an initial order for 200 aircraft "off the drawing board", the first three of which were to function as prototypes. On 22 December 1941, the first prototype of the Firefly performed its maiden flight. Although the aircraft was 4,000 lb (1,800 kg) heavier than the preceding Fulmar (largely due to the adoption of the heavier Griffon engine and the armament of two 20 mm (0.79 in) Hispano cannon in each wing), the Firefly was 40 mph (64 km/h) faster due to improved aerodynamics, as well as the increased power of the Griffon IIB engine, being capable of generating a maximum of 1,735 hp (1,294 kW).

The Firefly was a low-wing cantilever monoplane, featuring an oval-section metal semi-monocoque fuselage and a conventional tail unit with forward-placed tailplane. It was powered by a Rolls-Royce Griffon liquid-cooled piston engine, which drove a four-blade Rotol-built propeller. A large chin-mounted radiator was present to provide cooling for the engine. The Firefly had retractable main undercarriage and tail wheel, the hydraulically-actuated main landing gear retracting inwards into the underside of the wing centre-section. This undercarriage was widely-set, a highly useful feature for carrier landings. The aircraft was also fitted with a retractable arrester hook mounted underneath the rear fuselage. The pilot's cockpit was located above the leading edge of the wing while the observer/radio-operator/navigator was positioned aft of the wing's trailing edge. These positions provided better visibility for operating and landing and both crew were provided with separate jettisonable canopies.

The Firefly was equipped with an all-metal wing which could be folded manually, the wings ending up along the sides of the fuselage when folded. When in the flying position, the wings were hydraulically locked in place. The wing itself featured square tips and large Fairey-Youngman flaps, which provided relatively good handling while flown at low speeds. Four 20 mm cannon were buried within the wings, which was considered to be relatively heavy armament for the era. According to pilots, the general handling of the Firefly was relatively well-balanced but strength was required for aerobatics.

During 1942, handling and performance trials were first undertaken at RAF Boscombe Down by Admiralty test pilots Mike Lithgow and Roy Sydney Baker-Falkner. By 1944, the Firefly had been cleared to use under-wing rocket projectiles and, by April 1944, tests involving a double under-wing load of 16 rockets and a pair of 45 US gal (170 L; 37 imp gal) drop tanks still provided acceptable handling. Further testing with two 90 gallon (410 L) drop tanks or two 1,000 lb (450 kg) bombs deemed acceptable albeit with "...a small adverse effect on handling..." while "...handling with a single 1,000 lb (450 kg) bomb was unpleasant, but manageable." Performance trials at 11,830 lb (5,370 kg) indicated a maximum speed of 315 mph (507 km/h) at 16,800 ft (5,100 m) while a climb to 20,000 ft (6,100 m) took 12.4 minutes, with a maximum climb rate of 2,140 ft/min (650 m/min) at 3,800 ft (1,200 m), and a service ceiling of 30,100 ft (9,200 m).

== Operational history ==
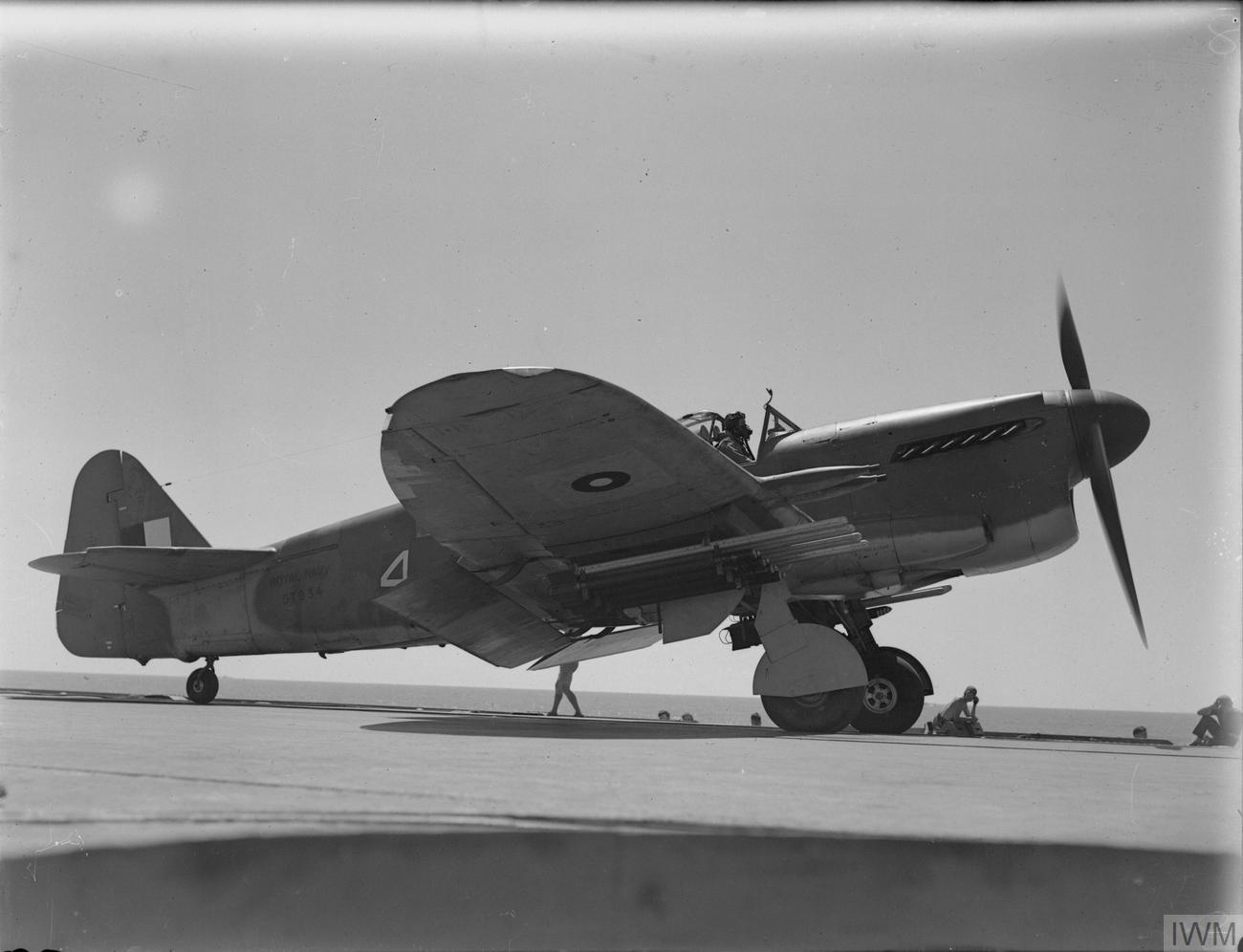
Firefly Mk I of the 1770 NAS aboard HMS Indefatigable departing for Sumatra during Operation Lentil, January 1945.

The primary variant of the aircraft used during the Second World War was the Firefly Mk I, which was used in all theatres of operations. During March 1943, the first Firefly Mk Is were delivered to the FAA but these did not enter operational service until July 1944, at which point they equipped 1770 Naval Air Squadron aboard HMS Indefatigable. The first operations were flown in the European theatre where Fireflies carried out numerous armed reconnaissance flights and anti-shipping strikes along the Norwegian coast. That year, Fireflies also provided air cover and aerial reconnaissance during attacks on the German battleship Tirpitz.

Throughout its operational career, the Firefly took on increasingly demanding roles from fighter to anti-submarine warfare while being stationed mainly with the British Pacific Fleet in the Far East and Pacific theatres. The type was used against Japanese ground targets and fighter aircraft. FAA Fireflies carried out attacks on oil refineries and airfields and were repeatedly dispatched against Japanese-controlled islands up until Victory over Japan Day. The Firefly gained a level of public renown when the type became the first British-designed and -built aircraft to overfly the Japanese capital of Tokyo.

During May 1945, in anticipation of a major naval offensive against the Japanese mainland, the Canadian government accepted a British offer to loan a pair of Colossus-class aircraft carriers to the Royal Canadian Navy. To equip these carriers, it was necessary to procure naval fighters. Based upon the feedback of veteran pilots, Canada opted to acquire the Firefly over opposition that favoured procuring American aircraft instead. As a stop-gap measure, Royal Navy Fireflies were loaned while more advanced purpose-built aircraft were being constructed. Between 1946 and 1954, the Canadian Navy employed 65 AS Mk.5 Fireflies on its aircraft carriers. The service also flew a handful of Mk.I Fireflies. During the 1950s, Canada decided to sell off its Fireflies and buyers included the armed forces of Ethiopia, Denmark, and the Netherlands.

After the Second World War, the Firefly remained in front line service with the Fleet Air Arm, continuing in this capacity until the mid-1950s. During this time, British-built Fireflies were also supplied to a number of overseas nations, including Canada, Australia, Denmark, Ethiopia, the Netherlands, India and Thailand.

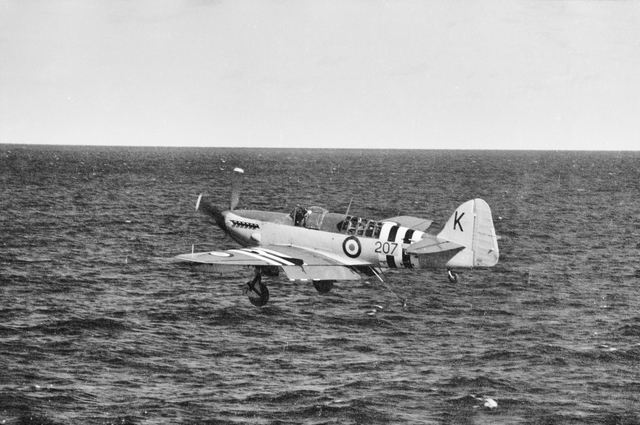
Firefly FR.4 of 817 Squadron RAN flies near HMAS Sydney during Korean War.

During 1947, the Australian government approved of formation of the Royal Australian Fleet Air Arm and the acquisition of a pair of Majestic-class aircraft carriers from Britain. Following a consultation with the Royal Navy, the Royal Australian Navy (RAN) opted to procure both the Firefly and the Hawker Sea Fury to equip its new aircraft carriers. These two types formed the backbone of the newly formed Australian Carrier Air Groups (CAGs), which would operate a total fleet size of 108 Fireflies, acquired across multiple orders. The first aircraft was delivered in May 1949, and the final Firefly arrived during August 1953. aircrew training predominated in early RAN operations ahead of achieving operational status during 1950.

During the Korean War of the 1950s, both British and Australian Fireflies carried out anti-shipping patrols and ground strikes from various aircraft carriers positioned offshore. Additional missions roles including anti-submarine patrols and aerial observation, as well as assisting battleships in providing effective naval gunfire support. Numerous FAA Fireflies were loaned to the Australian Navy during the conflict as many of its aircraft did not feature cannons when configured for anti-submarine warfare. Despite several incidents of aircraft being struck by anti-aircraft fire, the Firefly proved to be relatively rugged. The type was routinely used for strike operations against targets such as bridges and railway lines to damage North Korean logistics and communications. As the war went on, pilots developed new low-level dive-bombing techniques to achieve greater accuracy. Combat use of the Firefly in the theatre continued until the signing of the Korean Armistice Agreement on 27 July 1953, although post-armistice patrols involving the type continued for several years afterwards.

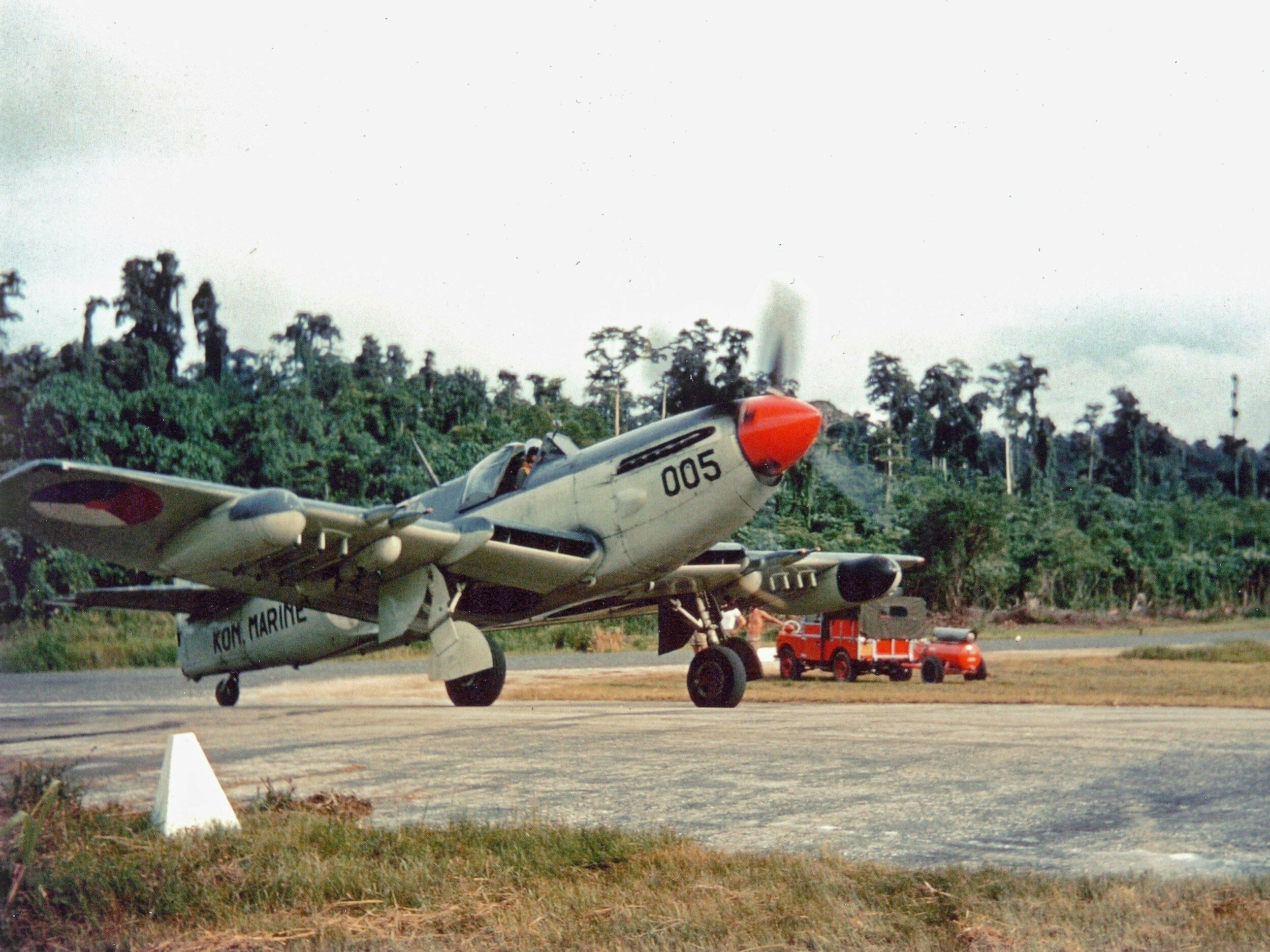
Firefly FR.Mk 4 of the Netherlands Navy operating in Dutch New Guinea.

FAA Fireflies were again deployed in the Far East amid the Malayan Emergency, where it was used to conduct ground-attack operations against Malayan Communist Party insurgents. The Firefly's front line career with the FAA came to an end shortly following the introduction of the newer and larger Fairey Gannet, which effectively replaced the type. The RAN also decided to relegate their Fireflies to secondary duties following the adoption of newer aircraft, such as the Gannet and the jet-powered de Havilland Sea Venom. Several versions of the type were developed later in its career to serve in a number of secondary roles, including as trainers, target tugs and drone aircraft.

The Indian Naval Air Arm operated it from INS Garuda in the late '50s and early '60s along with the Indian Air Force which ordered five examples of the TT.1 variant from Fairey which, already belonging to the Fleet Air Arm, were delivered in the early summer of 1954. An order for as many aircraft of the TT.4 variant was signed in 1956 (the aircraft were delivered two years later). In the early sixties, their maintenance began to become difficult, mainly due to the shortage of spare parts, and the aircraft were decommissioned. One was preserved and is on display

In the late 1940s, the Royal Netherlands Navy deployed a Firefly squadron to the Dutch East Indies, as part of the forces countering Indonesian nationalists. When talks broke down in July 1947, the Dutch launched multiple air strikes. Three Fireflies were shot down by ground fire. During 1960, in response to territorial demands and threats issued by Indonesia, the Netherlands chose to deploy a number of Firefly AS.Mk 4s to Dutch New Guinea. As Indonesian forces began to retake the territory, the Fireflies carried out attack operations during early 1962. These strikes continued until the Royal Netherlands Navy withdrew following the negotiation of a political settlement between the two countries.

== Variants ==
Firefly I / FR.I
Two variants of the Mk I Firefly were built; 429 "fighter" "Firefly F Mk I"s, built by Fairey and General Aircraft Ltd, and 376 "fighter/reconnaissance" Firefly "FR Mk I"s (which were fitted with the ASH detection radar). The last 334 Mk Is built were upgraded with the 1,765 hp (1,316 kW) Griffon XII engine.

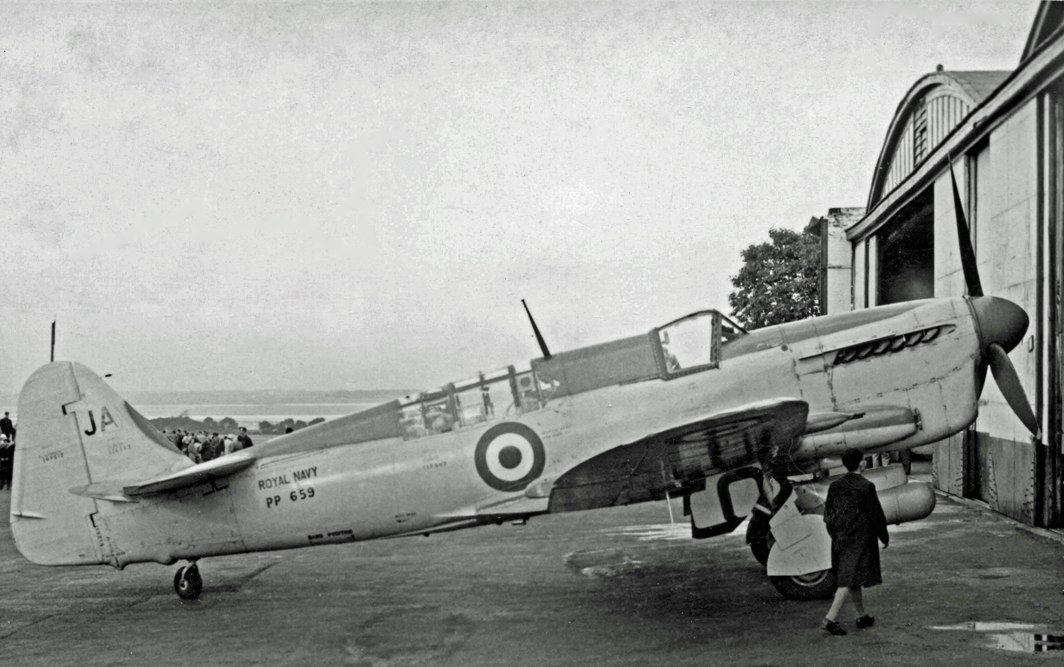
Firefly T.3 observer trainer of 1841 Squadron in 1952

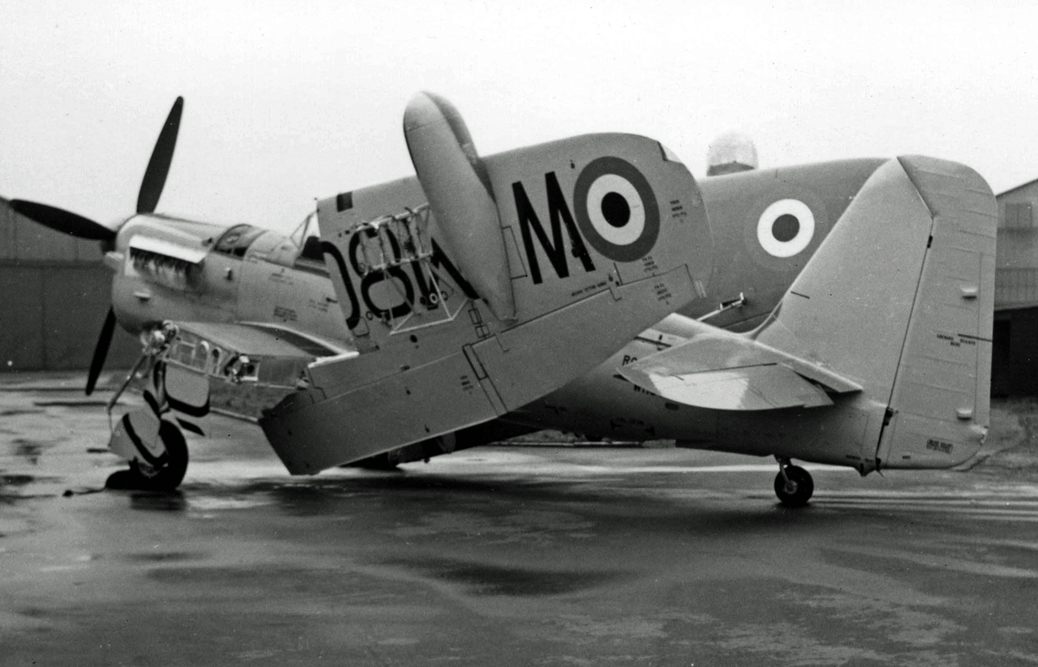
Firefly T.7 trainer with wings folded in 1953

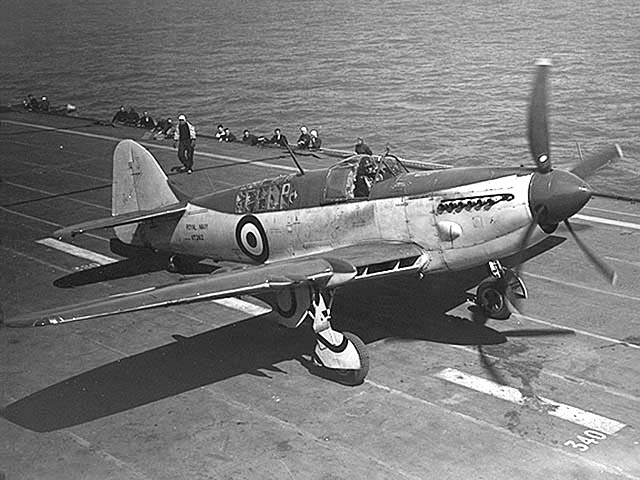
Firefly Mk IV

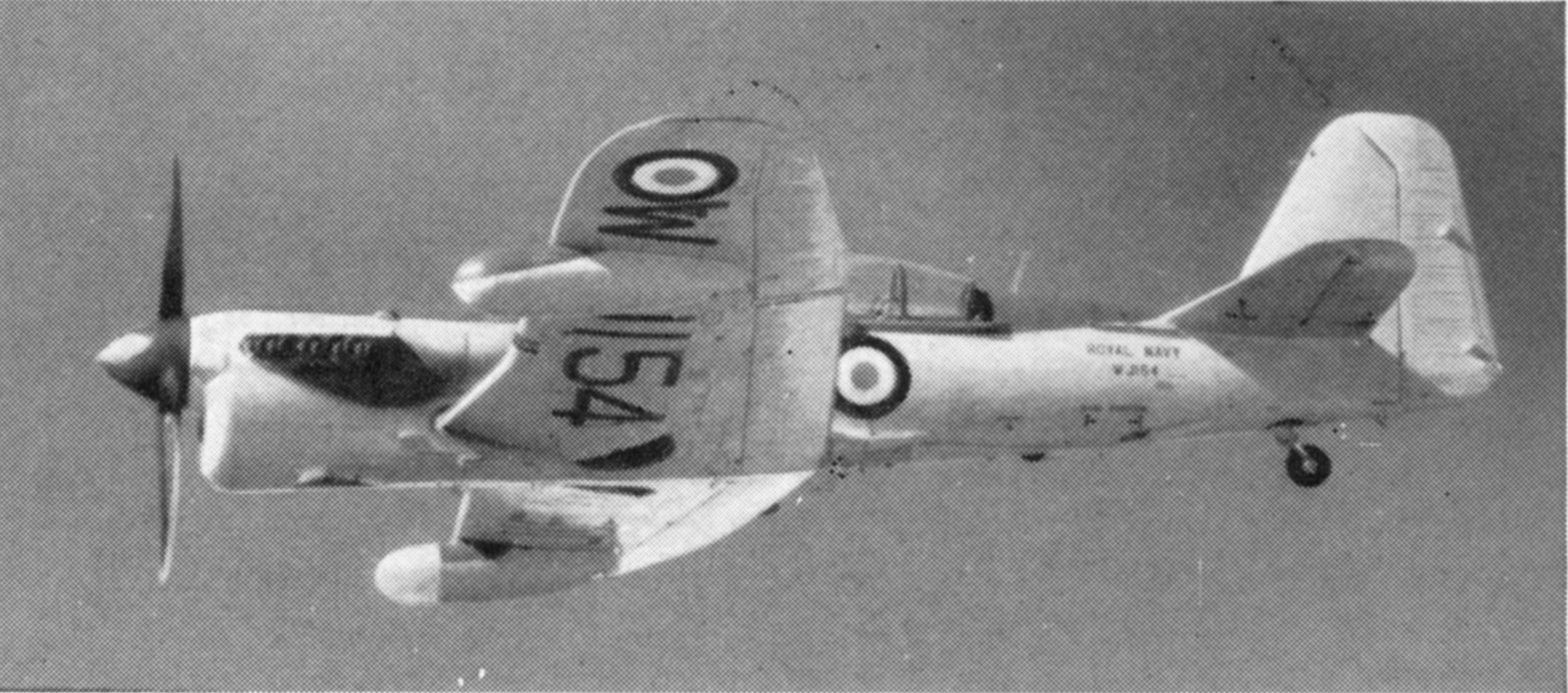
Firefly AS.Mk7 WJ154

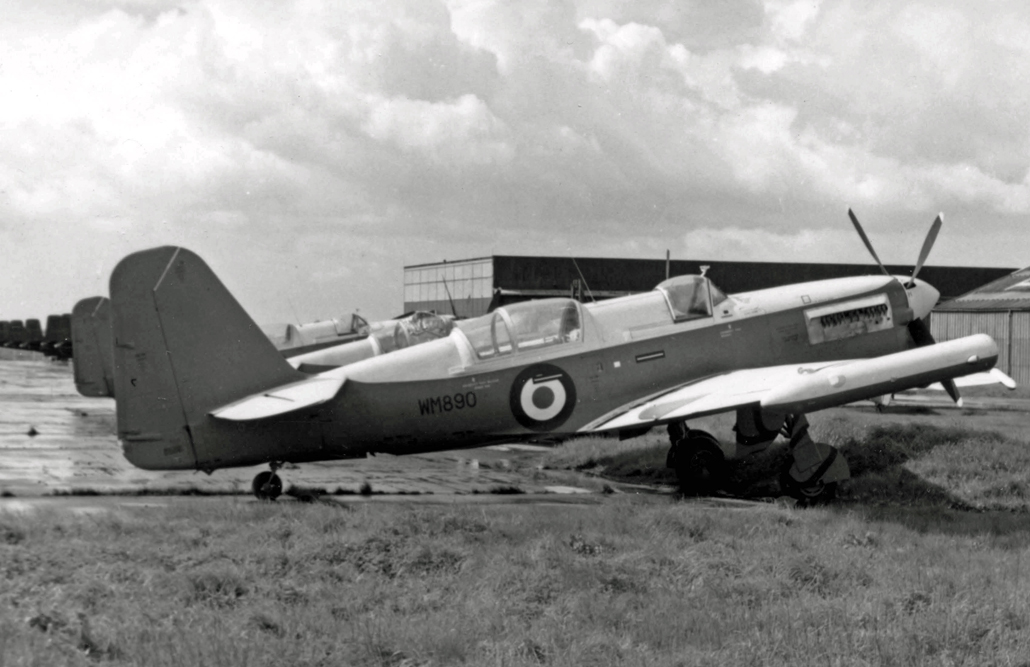
Firefly U.8 target drone aircraft in 1955

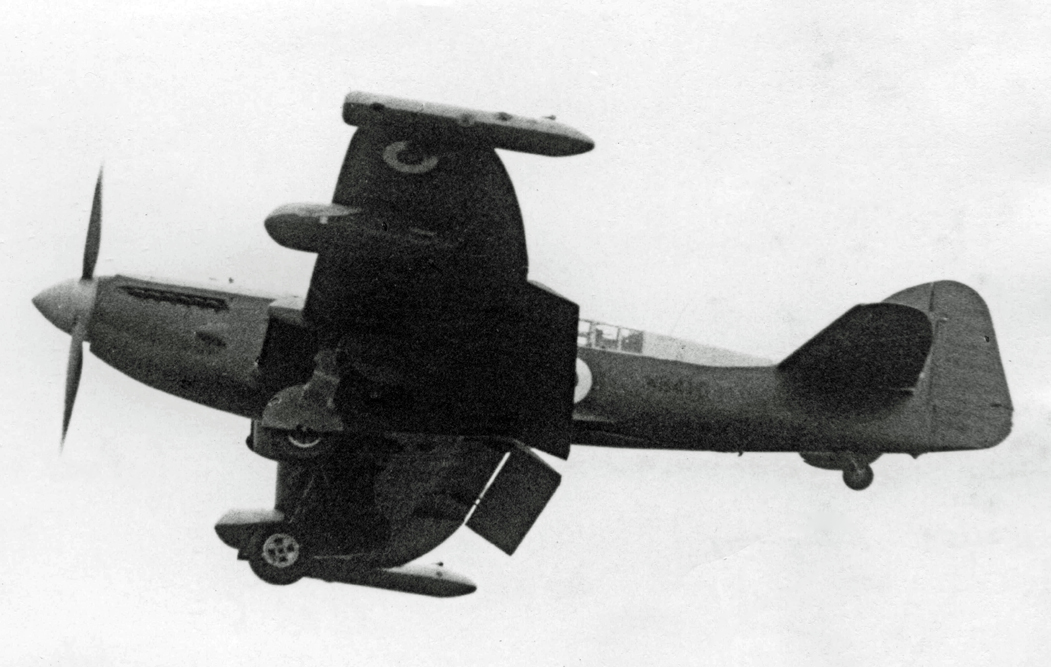
Firefly U.9 drone aircraft in 1959

Firefly NF.Mk II
Only 37 Mk II Fireflies were built, all of which were night fighter Firefly NF Mk IIs. They had a slightly longer fuselage than the Mk I and had modifications to house their airborne interception (AI) radar.
Firefly NF.Mk I
The NF.II was superseded by the Firefly NF Mk I "night fighter" variant.
Firefly T.Mk 1
Twin-cockpit pilot training aircraft. Post-war conversion of the Firefly Mk I.
Firefly T.Mk 2
Twin-cockpit armed operational training aircraft. Post-war conversion of the Firefly Mk I.
Firefly T.Mk 3
Used for Anti-submarine warfare training of observers. Postwar conversion of the Firefly Mk I.
Firefly TT.Mk I
Postwar, a small number of Firefly Mk Is were converted into target tug aircraft.
Firefly Mk III
Proposal based on the Griffon 61 engine, but never entered production.
Firefly Mk IV
The Firefly Mk IV was equipped with the 2,330 hp (1,740 kW) Griffon 72 engine and first flew in 1944, but did not enter service until after the end of the war.
Firefly FR.Mk 4
Fighter-reconnaissance version based on the Firefly Mk IV.
Firefly Mk 5
Firefly NF.Mk 5
Night fighter version based on the Firefly Mk 5.
Firefly FR.Mk 5
Fighter-reconnaissance version based on the Firefly Mk 5.
Firefly AS.Mk 5
The later Firefly AS.Mk 5 was an anti-submarine aircraft, which carried American sonobuoys and equipment.
Firefly Mk 6
Firefly AS.Mk 6
The Firefly AS.Mk 6 was an anti-submarine aircraft, which carried British equipment.
Firefly TT.Mk 4/5/6
Small numbers of AS.4/5/6s were converted into target tug aircraft.
Firefly AS.Mk 7
The Firefly AS.Mk 7 was an anti-submarine aircraft, powered by a Rolls-Royce Griffon 59 piston engine.
Firefly T.Mk 7
The Firefly T.Mk 7 was an interim ASW training aircraft.
Firefly U.Mk 8
The Firefly U.Mk 8 was a target drone aircraft; 34 Firefly T.7s were diverted on the production line for completion as target drones.
Firefly U.Mk 9
The Firefly U.Mk 9 was a target drone aircraft; 40 existing Firefly Mk AS.4 and AS.5 aircraft were converted to this role.
B.J.4
(Thai: บ.จ.๔) Thai designation for the Firefly FR.I and T.2.

== Operators ==
- Australia
- Canada
- Denmark
- Ethiopia
- India
- Netherlands
- Sweden
- Thailand
- United Kingdom

== Surviving aircraft ==
=== Australia ===
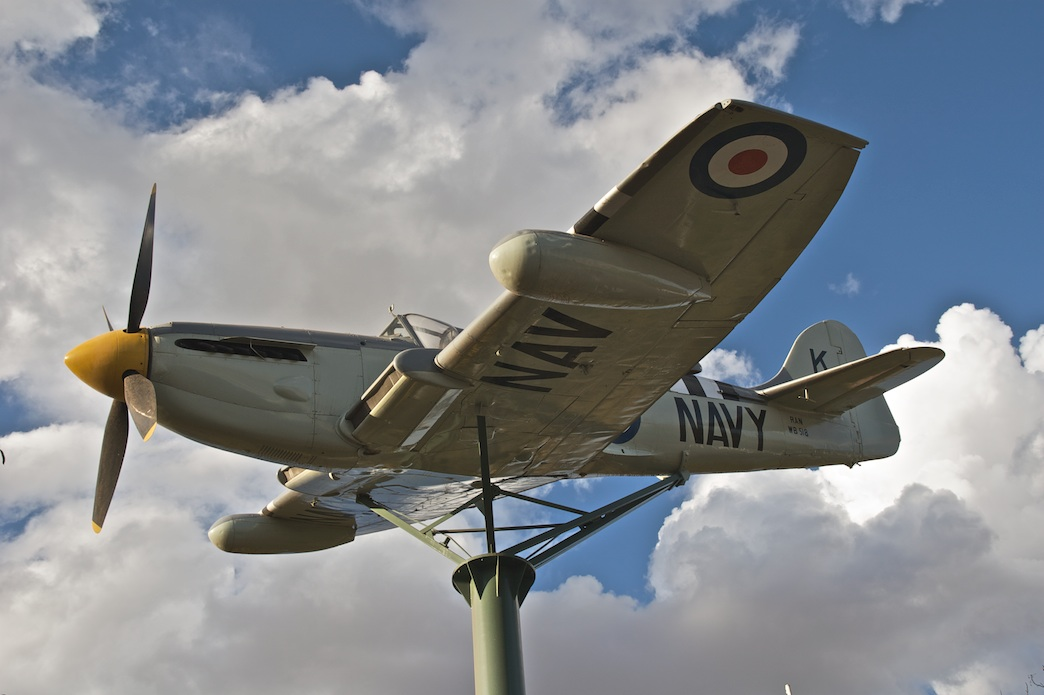
Firefly TT.6 on display in Griffith, Australia

On display

- Firefly AS Mk.6 WD826 - Displayed at the Royal Australian Navy's Fleet Air Arm Museum (Australia). This Firefly was restored to airworthy condition in the 1980s and flew for three years before its return to the museum.
- Firefly AS Mk.6 WD827 - Once owned by the Australian Air League, Blacktown, New South Wales, WD827 is now on display in the Australian National Aviation Museum, Melbourne, Victoria.
- Firefly AS Mk.6 WD828 - Displayed on a pole outside the Returned Services Leagues Club in Griffith, Australia. It has been repainted as WB518 which was the original aircraft displayed in Griffith but is now the flying example restored by Captain Kurdziel. The swap was made in 1991.

Stored

- Firefly AS MK.6 WJ109 - Stored for eventual exhibition at the Australian War Memorial, Canberra. This aircraft was previously at the Fleet Air Arm Museum (Australia), Nowra, New South Wales.

=== Canada ===
Airworthy

- Firefly Mk.IV WH632 - flown by the Canadian Warplane Heritage Museum in Royal Canadian Navy colours.

On display

- Firefly FR Mk.I PP462 - on display at the Shearwater Aviation Museum. This airframe is one of two recovered from Ethiopia.

Under Restoration

- Firefly FR Mk.I DK545 - part of the collection at the Canada Aviation and Space Museum. This airframe was recovered from Ethiopia.

=== India ===
On display

- Firefly TT.1 IN112 - The sole remaining Firefly of the 10 acquired by India is displayed at the Naval Aviation Museum in Goa.

=== United Kingdom ===
On display

- Firefly Mk.1 Z2033 - The Imperial War Museum owns one of the oldest surviving Fireflies, serial number Z2033. Built as a Mk.I in 1944, Z2033 was used originally by the RNAS for aircraft landing trials, then by Fairey for spin trials. Z2033 was converted to target tug designation and operated in Sweden in the 1950s in this role. The aircraft returned to the UK in 1964 to go on display at the Skyframe Aircraft Museum, and was acquired by Imperial War Museum in 1979. The museum returned Z2033 to its original MkI configuration, and repainted the aircraft as 'DK431' of 1771 Naval Air Squadron, as operated in the Pacific in July 1945. Z2033 was loaned to the Fleet Air Arm Museum for display between 2000 and August 2023, but the aircraft is now on display again at Imperial War Museum Duxford.

=== United States ===
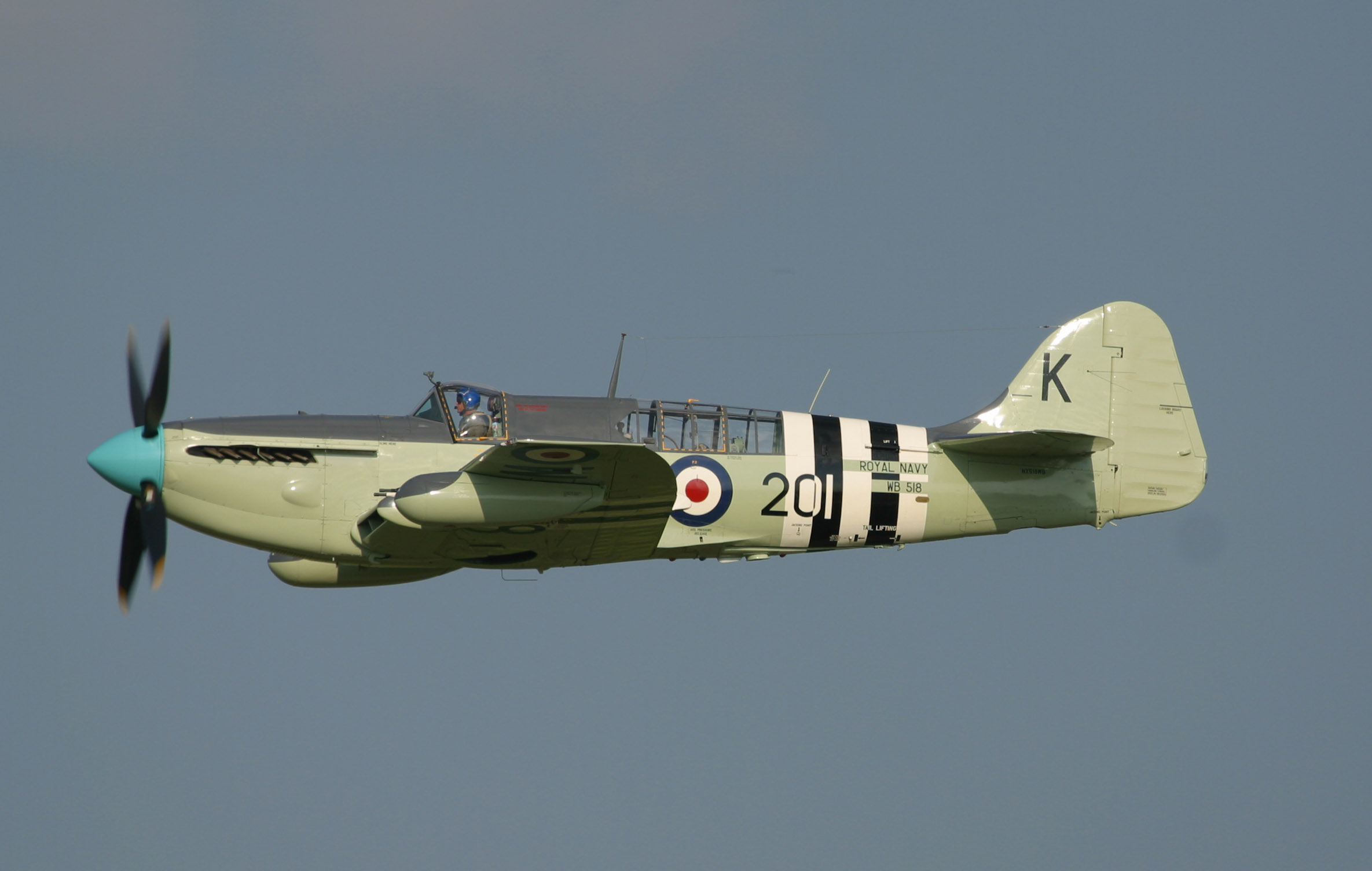
Firefly AS Mk.6 WB518

Airworthy

- Firefly AS Mk 6 WB518 - WB518 was one of the first 10 Mk.6s built, but retained the earlier Mk.5 fuselage. It was originally delivered to the Royal Australian Navy's 817 Squadron and then served in 816 Squadron before being retired and ending up as a memorial on a pole in Griffith, New South Wales, Australia. WB518 was then purchased by American Eddie Kurdziel, a Northwest Airlines captain and former U.S. Navy pilot. WB518 was extensively restored and made its first public appearance at Oshkosh in 2002.

=== Thailand ===
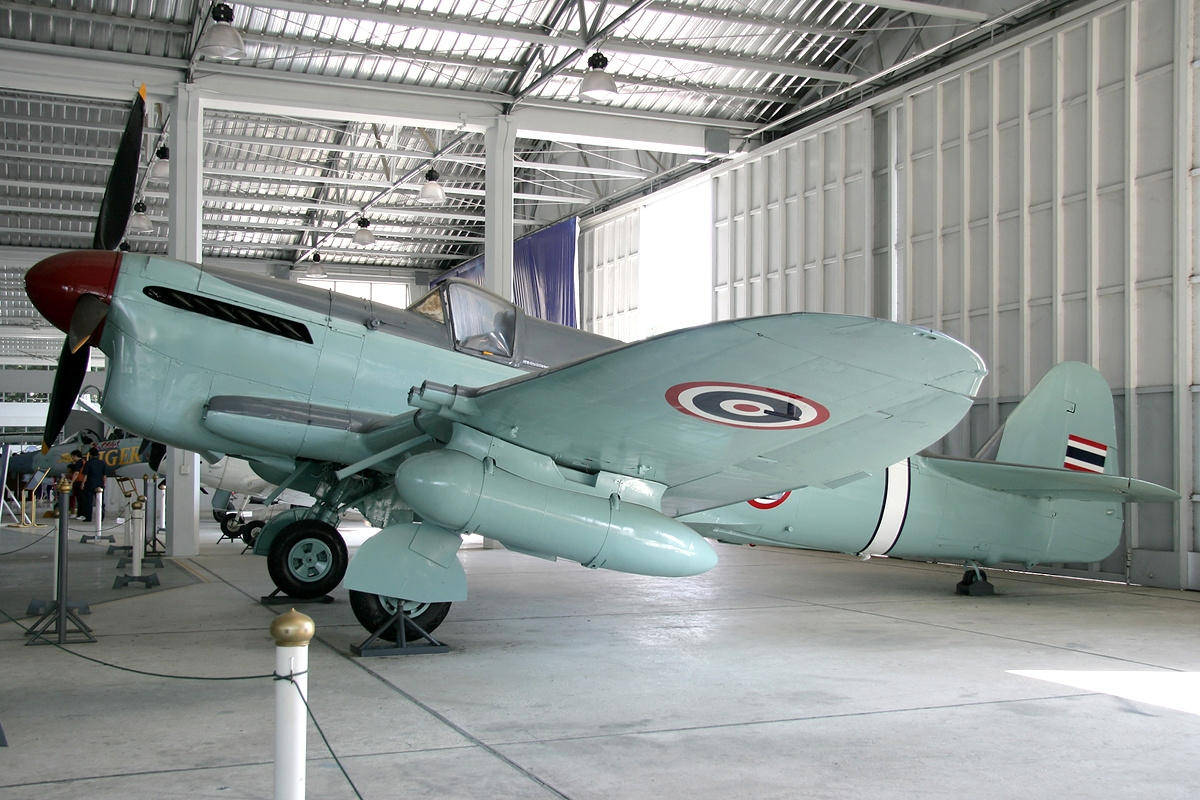
Fairey Firefly FR1 of Royal Thai Air Force

On display

- Firefly FR.1 J4/11/94 - The Royal Thai Air Force Museum in Bangkok, Thailand has a Firefly Mk I on display.

== Specifications (Mk.4 / Mk.5 / Mk.6) ==
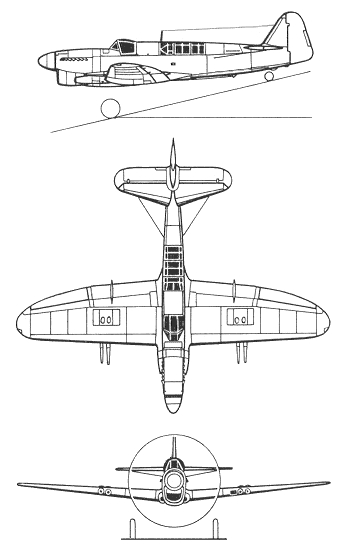
3-view drawing of Fairey Firefly Mk.I

Data from Fairey Aircraft since 1915 and Jane's All the World's Aircraft 1949–50.

General characteristics

- Crew: 2
- Length: 37 ft 11 in (11.56 m)
- Wingspan: 41 ft 2 in (12.55 m)
- Width: 13 ft 6 in (4.11 m) wings folded
- Height: 14 ft 4 in (4.37 m) including prop disc
- Wing area: 330 sq ft (31 m^{2})
- Empty weight: 9,674 lb (4,388 kg)
- Gross weight: 12,727 lb (5,773 kg) stripped for fighter mission

13,479 lb (6,114 kg) normal

- Max takeoff weight: 15,615 lb (7,083 kg) with two drop-tanks
- Powerplant: 1 × Rolls-Royce Griffon 74 V-12 liquid-cooled piston engine, 2,300 hp (1,700 kW) for take-off

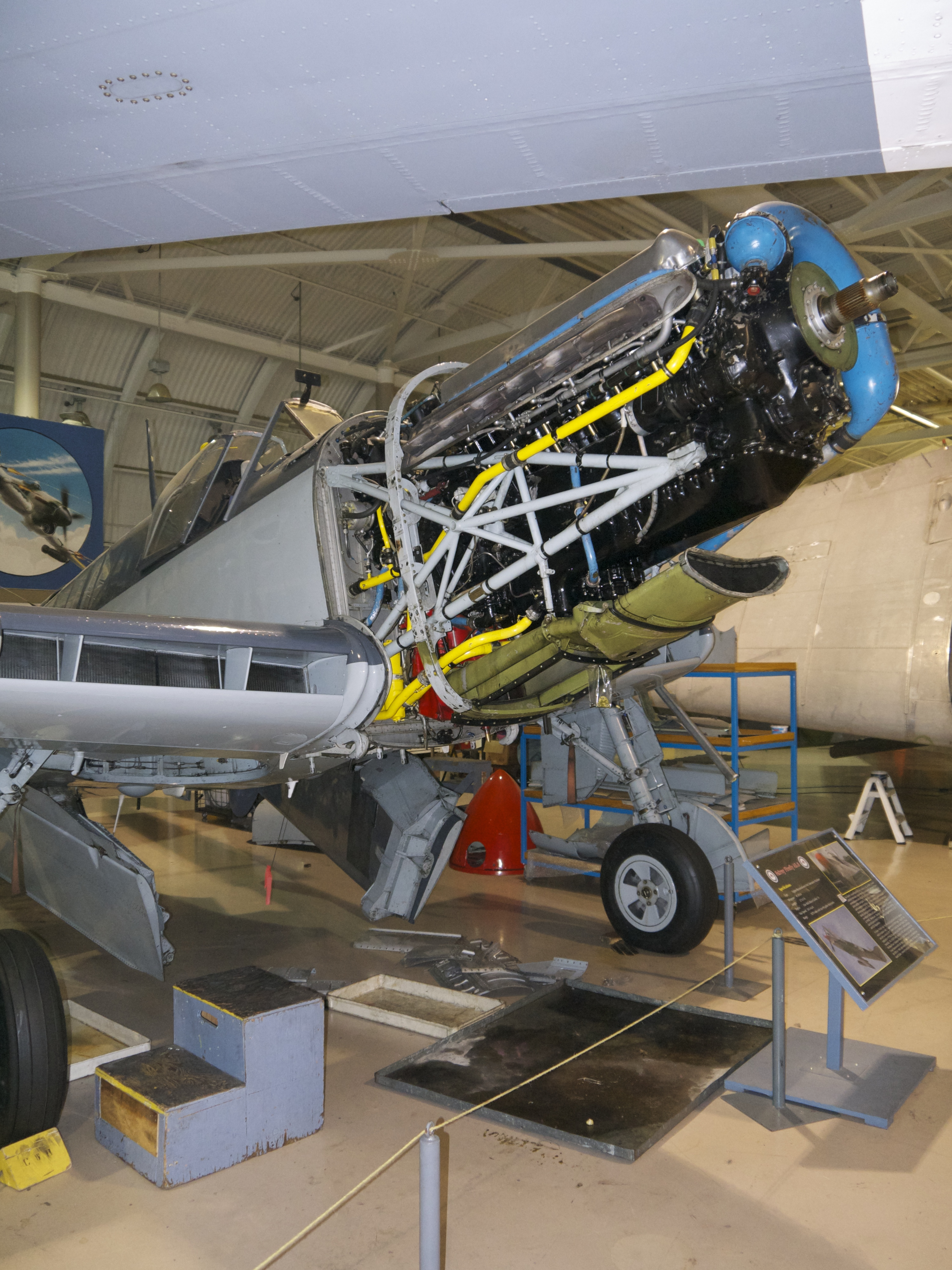
Griffon engine photo from the Firefly

- Propellers: 4-bladed Rotol constant-speed propeller

Performance

- Maximum speed: 367–386 mph (591–621 km/h, 319–335 kn) at 14,000 ft (4,300 m)

330 mph (287 kn; 531 km/h) at sea level

- Cruise speed: 209 mph (336 km/h, 182 kn)
- Range: 760 mi (1,220 km, 660 nmi) on internal fuel at 209 mph (182 kn; 336 km/h)
- Ferry range: 1,335 mi (2,148 km, 1,160 nmi) with 2 90 imp gal (110 US gal; 410 L) drop-tanks at 209 mph (182 kn; 336 km/h)
- Service ceiling: 31,900 ft (9,700 m)
- Time to altitude:

- 5,000 ft (1,500 m) in 3 minutes 36 seconds
- 10,000 ft (3,000 m) in 7 minutes 9 seconds
- 20,000 ft (6,100 m) in 10 minutes 30 seconds

- Wing loading: 43 lb/sq ft (210 kg/m^{2})
- Power/mass: 0.164 hp/lb (0.270 kW/kg)

Armament

- Guns: 4 × 20 mm (0.787 in) Hispano Mk.V cannon
- Rockets: maximum 16 × RP-3 60 lb (27.2 kg) rockets on 8 × zero-length launchers
- Bombs: maximum 2 × 1,000 lb (454 kg) on underwing pylons

Avionics

- Radar
- Radio
- Night-flying instrumentation / equipment

== See also ==
Related development

- Fairey Fulmar

Aircraft of comparable role, configuration, and era

- Fairey Battle
- Fairey Gannet

Related lists

- List of aircraft of World War II
- List of aircraft of the Fleet Air Arm
