= 847 Naval Air Squadron =

Flying squadron of the Royal Navy's Fleet Air Arm

- Squadron badge
- Active: 1943–1944; 1956–1959; 1963–1964; 1969–1971; 1982; 1995–present
- Country: United Kingdom
- Branch: Royal Navy
- Type: Commando Helicopter Force light-lift squadron
- Role: Royal Marines: Tactical airlift; Armed reconnaissance; Close air support (CAS)
- Part of: Fleet Air Arm; Joint Aviation Command; Commando Helicopter Force
- Home station: RNAS Yeovilton
- Motto: Ex alto concutimus (Latin for 'We strike them from on high')
- Aircraft: AgustaWestland Wildcat AH1
- Battle honours: East Indies 1944; Falkland Islands 1982; Al Faw 2003
- Website: Official website

Insignia
- Squadron Badge Description: Blue, a sea lion winged gold langued red (1944)
- Identification Markings: 3A+ (Barracuda); 086-088 (Gannet); single letter (Whirlwind); single letter (Wessex 1967-71); XA+ (Wessex 1982); CA-J (Gazelle); LR/MIL/Y/N/X (Lynx, uncoded from 2002)
- Fin Carrier/Shore Codes: CU:A (Whirlwind); S (Wessex 1969-71)

847 Naval Air Squadron (847 NAS), sometimes called 847 Squadron, is a Fleet Air Arm (FAA) naval air squadron of the United Kingdom’s Royal Navy (RN). It operates AgustaWestland Wildcat AH.1 helicopters and provides armed reconnaissance and light transport support to UK Commando Force. Along with 845 and 846 naval air squadrons, it forms part of the Commando Helicopter Force. The squadron was re-formed from 3 Commando Brigade Air Squadron on 1 September 1995 and is based at RNAS Yeovilton in Somerset, a Royal Naval establishment, with helicopters drawn from an Army Air Corps pool and flown by Royal Marines and Royal Navy aircrews.

The squadron was active in the later years of the Second World War, utilising the Grumman Avenger. In the late fifties, it operated the Fairey Gannet, particularly during the Cyprus Emergency. Throughout the sixties, it flew the Westland Whirlwind, providing support for Royal Marines deployments abroad, and by 1970, it transitioned to the Westland Wessex. Additionally, it operated the Westland Wessex briefly in 1982, especially during the Falklands conflict. From the mid-nineties onward, the squadron utilised the Westland Lynx and Westland Gazelle across various operational theatres internationally, eventually transitioning to the AgustaWestland Wildcat in 2014.

== History ==
=== Second World War ===
847 Naval Air Squadron was first formed at RNAS Lee-on-Solent (HMS Daedalus), Hampshire as a Torpedo Bomber Reconnaissance (TBR) unit on 1 June 1943, equipped with twelve Fairey Barracuda torpedo and dive bomber aircraft. It conducted its initial training at RNAS Fearn (HMS Owl), Scottish Highlands and RNAS Machrihanish (HMS Landrail), Argyll and Bute. The squadron's strength was subsequently reduced to nine aircraft prior to its integration into the 21st Naval TBR Wing.

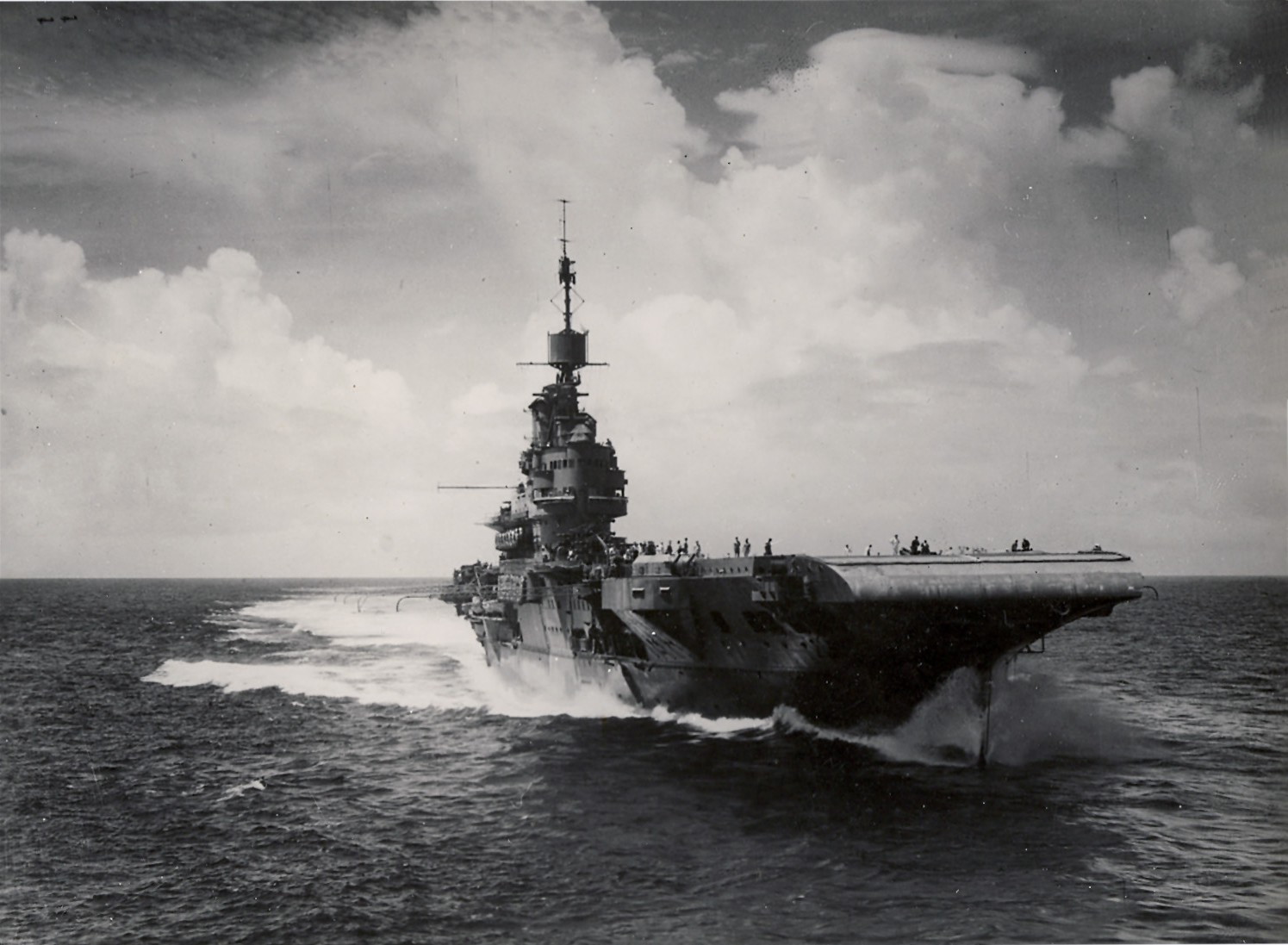
HMS Illustrious in the Indian Ocean, while operating with the USS Saratoga

After working up, the squadron deployed aboard the name ship of her class, the aircraft carrier HMS Illustrious in November 1943. HMS Illustrious sailed for the Indian Ocean at the end of December, arriving at Colombo in Ceylon (now Sri Lanka) on 30 January 1944. Aside from a short deployment aboard the light aircraft carrier HMS Unicorn, the squadron alternated its operations between HMS Illustrious and the shore bases at the RN Air Section at RAF China Bay or RNAS Katukurunda (HMS Ukussa), both Ceylon.

On 19 April 1944, the squadron took part in Operation Cockpit, a raid by aircraft from HMS Illustrious and the American carrier USS Saratoga against Sabang. The squadron took part in a raid by HMS Illustrious's air wing against Port Blair on 19 June, but disbanded at Trincomalee in Ceylon on 30 June, its personnel and aircraft being absorbed into 810 Naval Air Squadron.

=== Gannet (1956-1959) ===
The squadron reformed at RNAS Eglinton (HMS Gannet), County Londonderry in Northern Ireland, on 17 March 1956, equipped with three Fairey Gannet A.S.1 anti-submarine aircraft. It deployed to RAF Nicosia in Cyprus on 8 April, with the role of carrying patrols to stop ships smuggling arms to insurgents during the Cyprus Emergency. The squadron received newer Gannet A.S.4s in June 1958, but returned to the United Kingdom in November 1959 after the end of the Emergency, disbanding at RNAS Yeovilton (HMS Heron), Somerset, on 1 December 1959.

=== Whirlwind (1963-1964) ===
The squadron reformed again at RNAS Culdrose (HMS Seahawk), Cornwall in the Commando (i.e. troop support) role, equipped with Westland Whirlwind HAS.7 helicopters. 'B' Flight was based at RNAS Sembawang in Singapore (known as HMS Simbang) from April 1964. It briefly supplementing its Whirlwinds by a single Hiller Raven light helicopter in June. On 30 May 1964, the squadron participated in the Fleet Air Arm's 30th Anniversary flypast, which was held in the presence of the Duke of Edinburgh at RNAS Yeovilton. Subsequently, in December 1964, the squadron was designated as 707 Squadron.

=== Wessex (1969-1971) ===
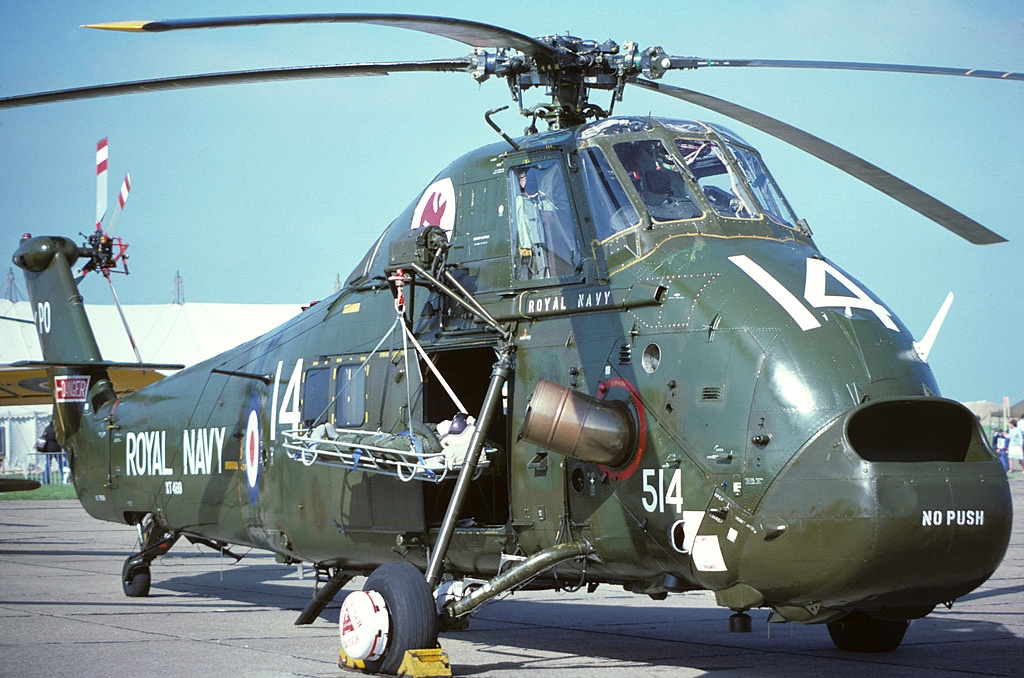
Westland Wessex HU.5; an example of the type used by 847 Squadron

The Wessex HU.5 was designed to meet the operational requirements of the Royal Marine Commandos, offering a helicopter that could transport a dozen or more fully-armed combat troops into action from the deck of an aircraft carrier or commando carrier to initiate an assault on an enemy beachhead. Furthermore, the Wessex HU.5 had the capability to engage ground targets utilising wire-guided air-to-surface missiles or to operate as a 'gunship'. 847 squadron reformed at RNAS Sembawang on 14 March 1969, being split off from 848 Naval Air Squadron and equipped with ten Westland Wessex HU.5s helicopters. The squadron operated both from shore and aboard ship, with detachments flying from the amphibious assault ships, the name ship of her class HMS Fearless and sister ship HMS Intrepid plus the Round Table-class landing ship logistics RFA Sir Galahad amongst others. In November 1970, the squadron, operating from HMS Intrepid and the Colossus-class light fleet aircraft carrier HMS Triumph, took part in relief efforts following flooding in East Pakistan (now Bangladesh) and in January 1971 carried out relief work in Malaysia. The squadron stood down on 22 May 1971, its helicopters being transferred to 848 Squadron.

=== Falklands War (1982) ===
847 Naval Air Squadron was reformed to take part in the Falklands campaign on 4 May 1982, operating twenty-four Westland Wessex HU.5 helicopters taken from 771 and 772 Squadrons with Royal Naval personnel recruited mainly from RNAS Yeovilton. The aircraft were transported from the United Kingdom to the South Atlantic aboard the helicopter support ship RFA Engadine and the container vessel SS Atlantic Causeway. (Note: Atlantic Causeway was sister ship to Atlantic Conveyor, which was hit and fatally damaged by an Exocet missile during the war.)

The SS Atlantic Causeway disembarked 12 Wessexes of 847 NAS on 1 June 1982, with the detachment from RFA Engadine arriving on 9 June. The squadron's Wessexes, together with those of 845 NAS initially operated from San Carlos and provided much needed transport support to the advance of British forces on Port Stanley, with forward operating bases being set up at Teal Inlet and Fitzroy. After the surrender of Argentine forces on the Falklands on 14 June 847 NAS relocated to Navy Point, a headland directly north of Port Stanley. 847 NAS remained in the Falklands until September 1982, providing air support to UK Forces.

847 NAS was one of the longest serving units to see action in the Falklands war, spending some 4 months on the islands in total, and leading some members of the squadron to refer to the unit as "84-who?" The squadron was disbanded on 24 September 1982.

=== Lynx and Gazelle (1995-2013) ===
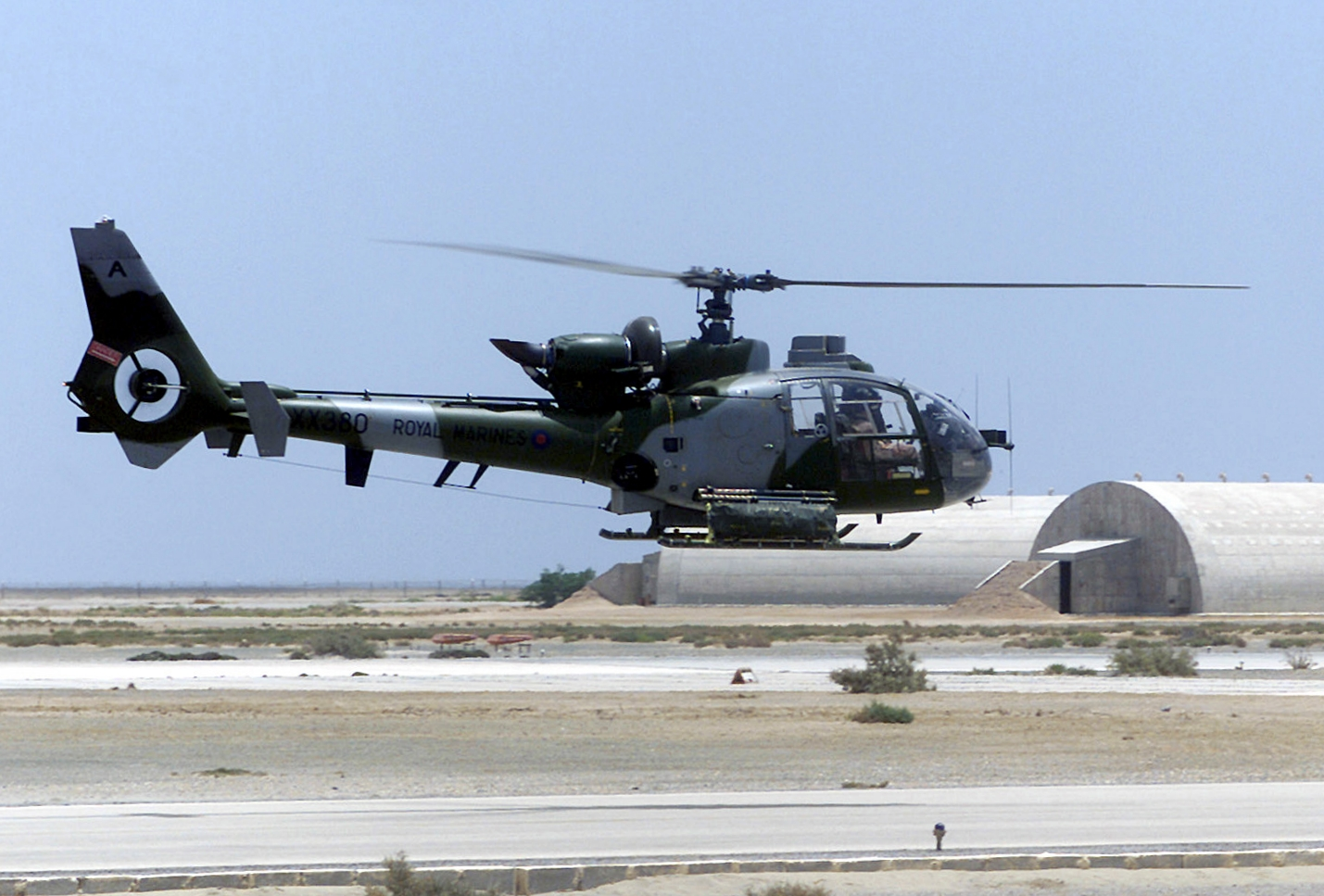
An 847 Squadron Westland Gazelle AH.1, takes off from Camp Justice, Oman in 2002

3 Commando Brigade Air Squadron (3CBAS) was recommissioned as 847 Squadron on 1 September 1995, equipped with six Westland Lynx AH.7 and nine Westland Gazelle AH.1 helicopters at RNAS Yeovilton with Royal Marines aircrews and REME engineers. The squadron undertook detachments to support Army and Royal Marine training operations in various locations including, the state of California, European countries such as: Czech Republic, Germany, Jordan, Poland, and Romania, the African countries South Africa, and Zimbabwe and also Brunei in Asia as well as conducting training detachments for squadron air and ground crews in Belize, France, Norway, and Denmark.

In May 2000, the squadron was recalled from an exercise in France to rejoin the amphibious assault ship HMS Ocean and was deployed to Sierra Leone in support of ground forces, returning to the region again in November. In January 2003, 847 Squadron deployed aboard HMS Ocean with six Westland Lynx helicopters, borrowed from the Army Air Corps, and six Westland Gazelles, to conduct offensive operations in Iraq during March and April. The squadron executed armed aviation patrols for 3 Commando Brigade, completing approximately 160 combat missions against enemy targets and frequently faced intense and sustained fire from small arms, mortars, and tanks. Following the amphibious assault, the squadron advanced to support an operation by 40 Commando on Abu Al-Khaseeb. Upon returning to the United Kingdom in late May, the squadron was recognised as one of only two Naval Air Squadrons to receive the Battle Honour Al Faw. The Westland Gazelles were retired from service in March 2005.

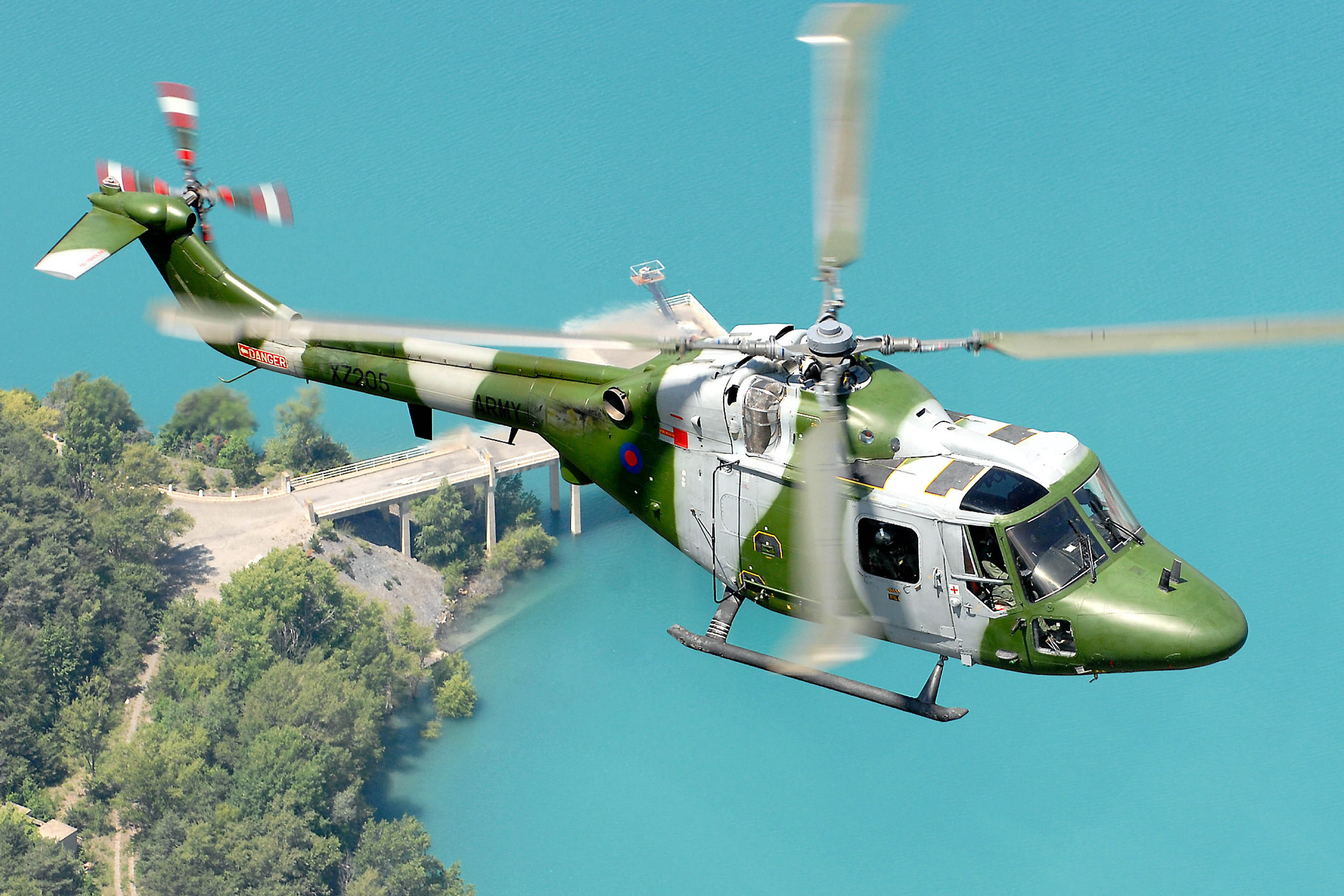
Westland Lynx Mk7 of 847 Squadron

The most significant deployment of recent years was to Operation Telic in Iraq in which it participated in the Battle of Basra. On 6 May 2006, one of the squadron's Lynxes, XZ614, was shot down over Basra in Iraq, by a surface-to-air missile (a Man Portable Air Defence System), killing 5 service personnel on board. Among the 5 killed were 847's commanding officer, Lieutenant Commander Darren Chapman; Wing Commander Coxen, who had been due to take command of the region's British helicopter forces, and Flight Lieutenant Sarah-Jayne Mulvihill; Coxen was the most senior British officer to die in the conflict and Mulvihill was the first British servicewoman to die in action in 22 years. This was the first British helicopter and only the second British aircraft downed (the first was an RAF Hercules) due to enemy fire, in the war. At the crash scene, British troops reportedly encountered rioting Iraqi civilians and were fired on by militia, while civilians were killed in the ensuing clashes. The crash led to a review of the vulnerability of helicopter transports in southern Iraq.

A subsequent deployment from October 2007 to February 2008 focused on transitioning squadron aircrew to the Westland Lynx AH.9, which was the wheeled version of the utility Lynx. Helicopters in the theater were equipped with specialised cameras that significantly enhanced the squadron's capabilities in airborne surveillance. A consistent progression of exercises and training led to the squadron's deployment to Camp Bastion in Afghanistan for Operation Herrick in September 2008, where they provided light utility support with five Lynx helicopters for a duration of eight months during the cooler months of the year. The squadron returned to Afghanistan in 2011, this time utilising the upgraded Lynx AH.9A, taking over from No. 652 Squadron AAC at Camp Bastion on 31 January, and subsequently being succeeded by No. 661 Squadron AAC on 22 May.

=== Wildcat (2014-present) ===
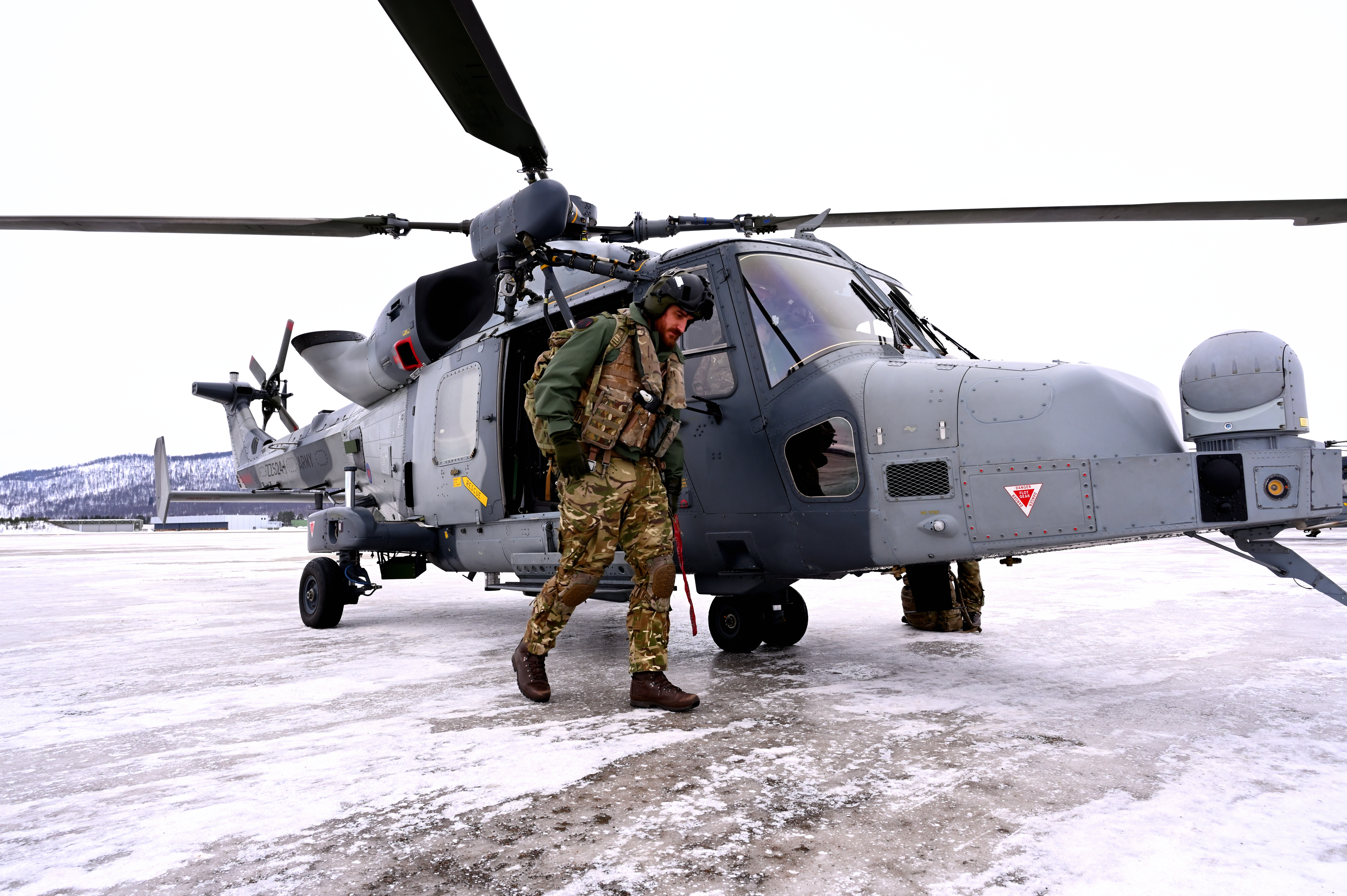
An 847 Squadron Aircrewman, walks in front of a Wildcat AH.1 helicopter after completing a rescue operation during Nordic Response 24

In late 2013, it became the first front-line military squadron to receive the AgustaWestland Wildcat AH.1, which enables the Squadron to continue providing Battlefield Reconnaissance as part of Commando Helicopter Force.

847 offers reconnaissance, aerial support, and anti-armour capabilities. The squadron is trained in specialised fieldcraft and survival techniques, enabling them to function in extreme environments, ranging from icy tundras to arid deserts. It is consistently maintained at Readiness State 2, which allows for deployment anywhere globally within five days. The competencies encompass Intelligence, surveillance, target acquisition, and reconnaissance (ISTAR), Control and direction of fire, Offensive action, Winching, Casualty evacuation, Combat recovery, Disaster relief, Fieldcraft and Survival techniques.

In June 2019 the squadron embarked on RFA Argus for a deployment to the Baltic Sea as part of the Joint Expeditionary Force. The squadron practised amphibious landings alongside the Merlins of 845 NAS as part of exercise Baltic Protector in the Baltic Sea.

== Aircraft operated ==
The squadron has operated a variety of different aircraft and versions:

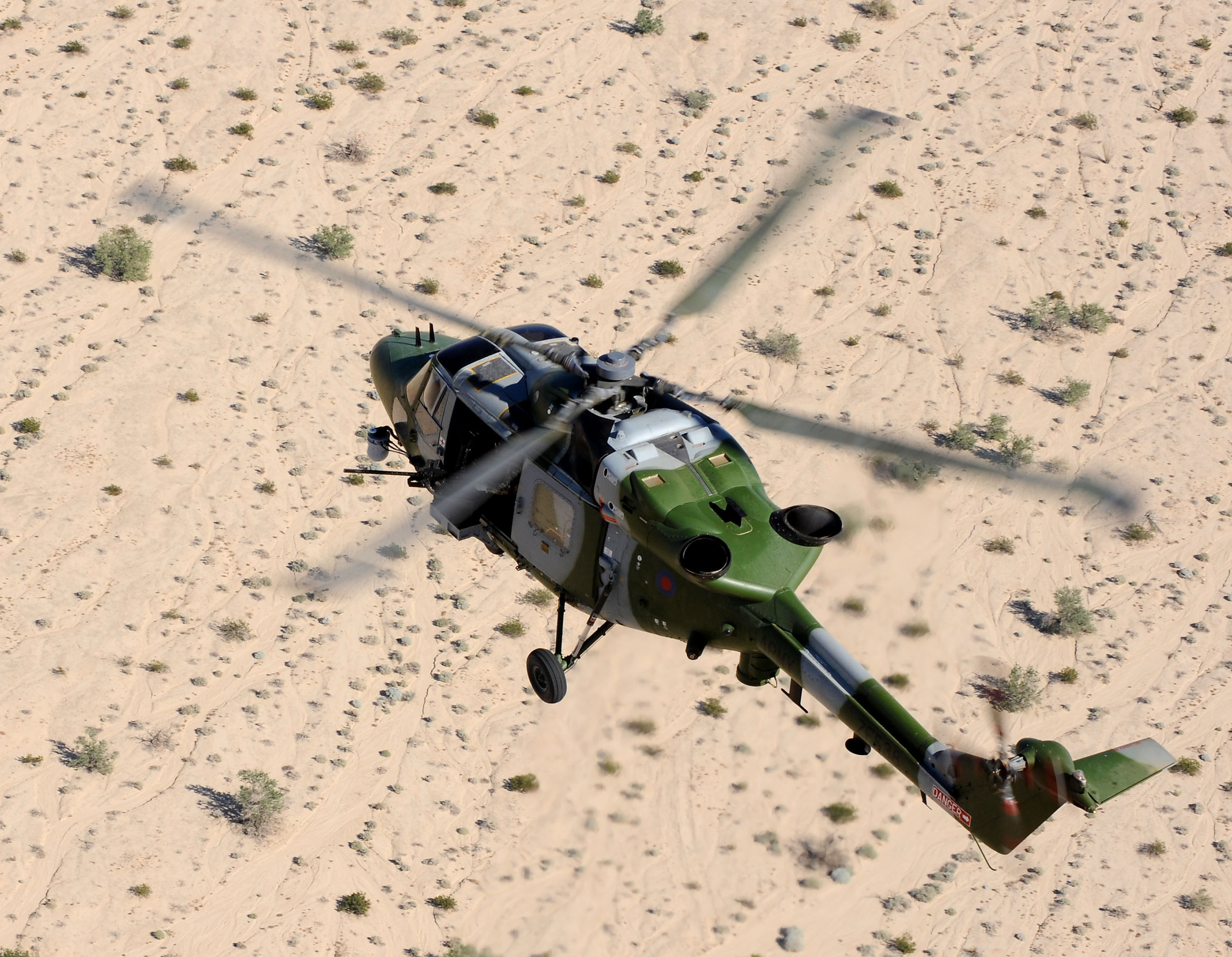
An 847 NAS Lynx AH.9A helicopter flying over the desert training areas surrounding Naval Air Facility El Centro in California, USA during 2012

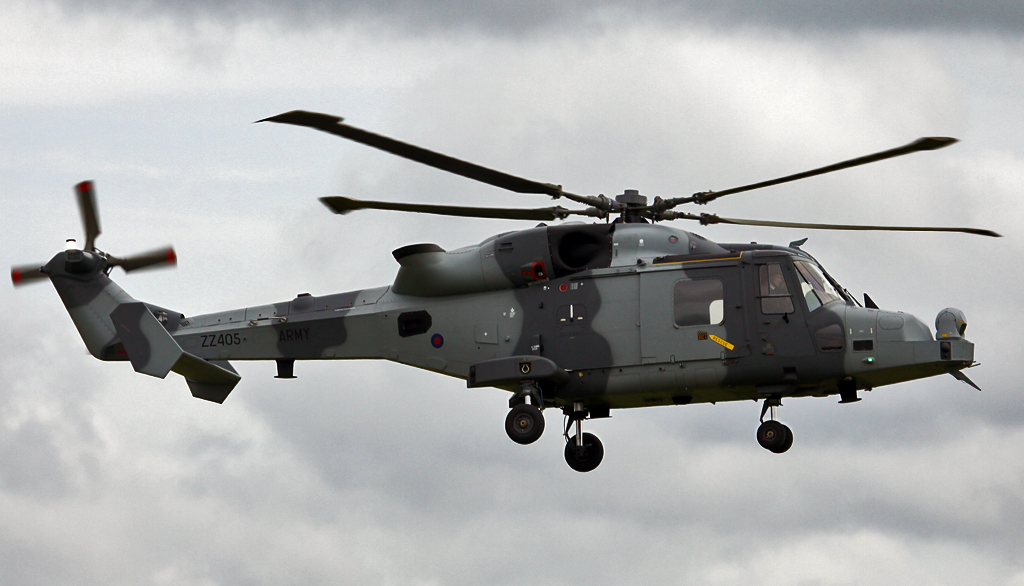
Wildcat AH.1

- Fairey Barracuda Mk.II torpedo and dive bomber (June 1943 - June 1944)
- Fairey Gannet AS.1 anti-submarine warfare aircraft (March 1956 - June 1958)
- Fairey Gannet AS.4 anti-submarine warfare aircraft (May 1958 - November 1959)
- Westland Whirlwind HAS.7 anti-submarine helicopter used as troop transport (May 1963 - December 1964)
- Westland Wessex HU.5 troop transport helicopter (March 1969 - May 1971, May - September 1982)
- Westland Gazelle AH.1 utility helicopter (September 1995 - March 2005)
- Westland Lynx AH.7 military utility helicopter (September 1995 - July 2012)
- Westland Lynx AH.9 "Battlefield Lynx" military utility helicopter (August 2007 - February 2008)
- Westland Lynx AH.9A military utility helicopter (October 2010 - May 2013)
- AgustaWestland Wildcat AH.1 utility, SAR and ASuW helicopter (January 2014 - present)

== Battle honours ==
The following battle honours have been awarded to 847 Naval Air Squadron:

- East Indies 1944
- Falkland Islands 1982
- Al Faw 2003

== Assignments ==
847 Naval Air Squadron was assigned as needed to form part of a number of larger units:

- 21st Naval TBR Wing (25 October 1943 - 30 June 1944)

== Commanding officers ==
List of commanding officers of 847 Naval Air Squadron:

1943 - 1944

- Lieutenant Commander(A) P.C. Whitfield, RN, from 1 June 1943
- Lieutenant Commander(A) J.L. Cullen, RN, from 20 July 1943
- disbanded - 30 June 1944

1956 - 1959

- Lieutenant Commander W.C. Martin, RN, from 3 April 1956
- Lieutenant Commander W.D. Lawrence, RN, from 22 March 1957
- Lieutenant Commander R.W.R. Hawkesworth, DSC, RN, from 26 May 1958
- disbanded - 1 December 1959

1963 - 1964

- Lieutenant Commander G.A. Andrews, RN, from 7 May 1963
- Lieutenant Commander D.J. Lickfold, RN, from 18 June 1964
- disbanded - 2 December 1964

1969 - 1971

- Lieutenant Commander P.J. Williams, RN, from 14 March 1969
- Lieutenant Commander J.S. Kelly, MBE, RN, from 4 July 1970
- disbanded - 22 May 1971

1982

- Lieutenant Commander M.D. Booth, RN, from 7 May 1982
- disbanded - 17 September 1982

1995 - present

- Captain A.D.J. Williams, RM, from 1 September 1995 (Major 30 June 1996)
- Captain M.P. Ellis, RM, from 20 December 1996
- Lieutenant Commander F.W. Robertson, MBE, RN, from 16 December 1998
- Major J.A. McCardle, RM, from 16 April 2001
- Major I.M. O'Donnell, RM, from 11 July 2002
- Major P.E.M. Morris, RM, from 4 September 2003
- Lieutenant Commander D. Chapman, RN, from 11 November 2005 ( † 6 May 2006)
- Major S.J. Hussey, RM, from 7 May 2006
- Major L.A. Brown, RM, from 1 September 2007
- Major J.F. Roylance, RM, from 1 August 2008 (Lieutenant Colonel 30 June 2009)
- Lieutenant Commander A.D. Riggall, RN, from 18 November 2009
- Major N.S.C. Venn, RM, from 6 July 2011 (Lieutenant Colonel 30 June 2012)
- Lieutenant Commander R.G. Spence, RN, from 6 July 2013 (Commander 30 June 2015)
- Major D. Sutton, MBE, RM, from 7 July 2016 (Lieutenant Colonel 1 June 2017)

Note: Abbreviation (A) signifies Air Branch of the RN or RNVR.
