= 3 Commando Brigade Air Squadron =

Royal Marines military unit

- Active: 1968–1995
- Country: (United Kingdom) UK
- Branch: Royal Marines
- Type: Land based and amphibious squadron
- Role: Commando Support
- Part of: Royal Marines/Commando Helicopter Force
- Garrison/HQ: RNAS Yeovilton
- Motto(s): Service at home and overseas

Aircraft flown
- Helicopter: Current AgustaWestland AW159 Wildcat; last Westland Lynx and Westland Gazelle AH.1; former Westland Scout AH.1, Westland (Agusta-Bell) Sioux AH.1

3 Commando Brigade Air Squadron, Royal Marines, was formed in 1968 in Singapore by the amalgamation of three Commando Air Troops and the Brigade Flight. The squadron moved to Plymouth in 1971 and the two remaining UK Commando Air Troops became part of it. Apart from during the Falklands War, when the whole squadron was involved, it operated mostly on individual flight detachments. 3 Commando Brigade Air Squadron became 847 Naval Air Squadron in 1995.

== Formation ==
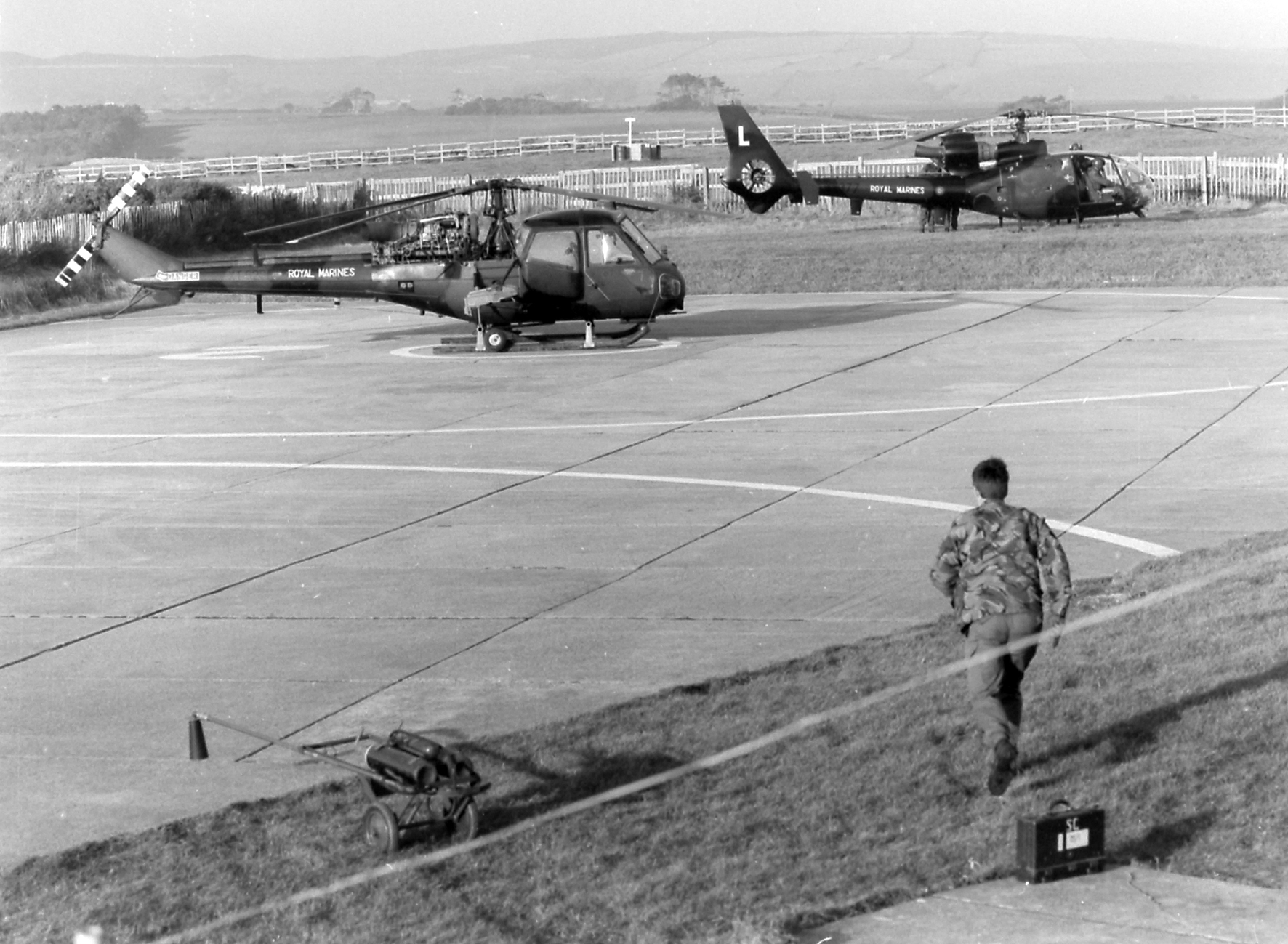
3BAS at an airfield in 1979

3 Commando Brigade Air Squadron Royal Marines (3 BAS) was formed on 12 August 1968, at Sembawang Air Base, Singapore. At the time, it was equipped with 14 Westland (Agusta-Bell) Sioux AH.1 helicopters with six Westland Scouts envisaged. It was the amalgamation of the Brigade Flight and the Air Troops of 40 Commando, 42 Commando and 29 Commando Regiment Royal Artillery (29 Cdo RA). Prior to its formation, it was understood that all non-RM support, such as REME personnel, would be Commando trained.

In 1971, 3 Commando Brigade was withdrawn from Singapore. 3 BAS established itself at Coypool, Plymouth on 19 July 1971. 41 Commando and 45 Commando Air Troops were merged into 3 BAS in 1971 and it was reorganised into one anti-tank flight and two utility flights, both equipped with Scouts, plus four reconnaissance flights of Sioux. It was organised into five flights, one for each of the Commando Groups and a fifth for the Commando Brigade HQ. Each flight was named after the battle honour of its affiliated Commando, namely Dieppe Flight for 40 Commando, Kangaw Flight for 42 Commando, Salerno Flight for 41 Commando and Montforterbeek Flight for 45 Commando. The Brigade HQ Flight was named Brunei Flight to commemorate the first time the "Commando Gunners" (29 Cdo RA) went into action to support the Brigade.

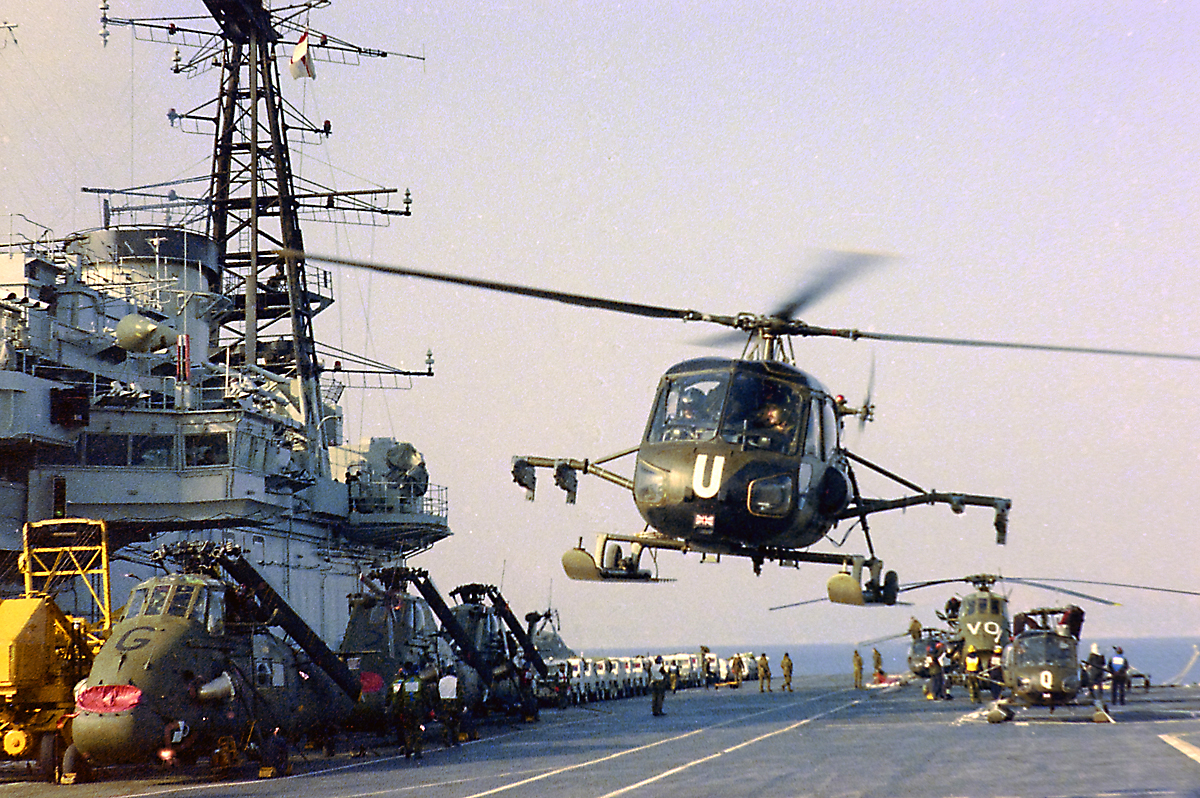
3 Commando Brigade Air Squadron Westland Scout helicopter landing on HMS Hermes, off the coast of northern Norway

The Sioux were replaced with 12 Westland Gazelle AH.1s in 1974/5, and in 1982 (after returning from the Falklands), four TOW-armed Westland Lynxes replaced the Scouts when the Squadron moved to RNAS Yeovilton (HMS Heron).Two further Lynx AH1 joined the Squadron some time later. 3 BAS saw service in a variety of environments including Belize, the Falkland Islands, Kurdistan, Northern Ireland and Norway.

== Falklands War 1982 ==
The squadron of six Scout and nine Gazelle helicopters went to the Falklands, commanded by Major Peter Cameron RM, who was awarded the Military Cross. Distinguished Flying Crosses (DFCs) were awarded to Lieutenant R J Nunn (posthumously) and Captain J P Niblet RM. The squadron was involved in every major ground battle during the campaign in a variety of roles; reconnaissance, liaison, the movement of ammunition to the front line, and the recovery of casualties from forward positions. Its helicopters flew a total of 2,110 hours in just over three weeks reflecting a remarkable rate of serviceability and flying.

On 21 May 1982, landings started under the codename Operation Sutton. That day, flying armed escort to a Sea King helicopter heading towards Port San Carlos, Sergeants Andy Evans RM and Eddy Candlish in Gazelle XX411 came under fire and had to ditch in San Carlos Water. Lieutenant Ken D Francis RM and Lance Corporal Brett Giffin in Gazelle XX402 set off to search for them, but were hit by ground fire from a heavy machine gun and killed instantly, their aircraft crashing on a hillside. Only Candlish survived. (The bodies were recovered to SS Canberra; when that ship was ordered to leave the Falklands and head for South Georgia, Evans, Francis and Giffin were buried at sea in a special service attended by many on board.) The remaining Gazelle XX412 (of the three deployed with 'C' Flight) also came under heavy small arms fire in the area, but managed to avoid casualties and return for inspection and repairs. The REME technicians were able to repair the damage, whilst under constant air attack by Argentinian 'Skyhawk' and 'Mirage' ground attack jets, and returned the aircraft for operational use. Gazelle XX412 continued to be fully operational for the remainder of the conflict.

On 28 May during the Battle of Goose Green, as Lieutenant Colonel H. Jones lay dying, his men radioed for urgent casualty evacuation. However, the Scout helicopter sent to evacuate Jones was shot down by an Argentine FMA IA 58 Pucara ground attack aircraft. Pilot Lieutenant Richard Nunn RM was killed (and posthumously received the DFC); aircrewman Sergeant Belcher RM was badly wounded in both legs.

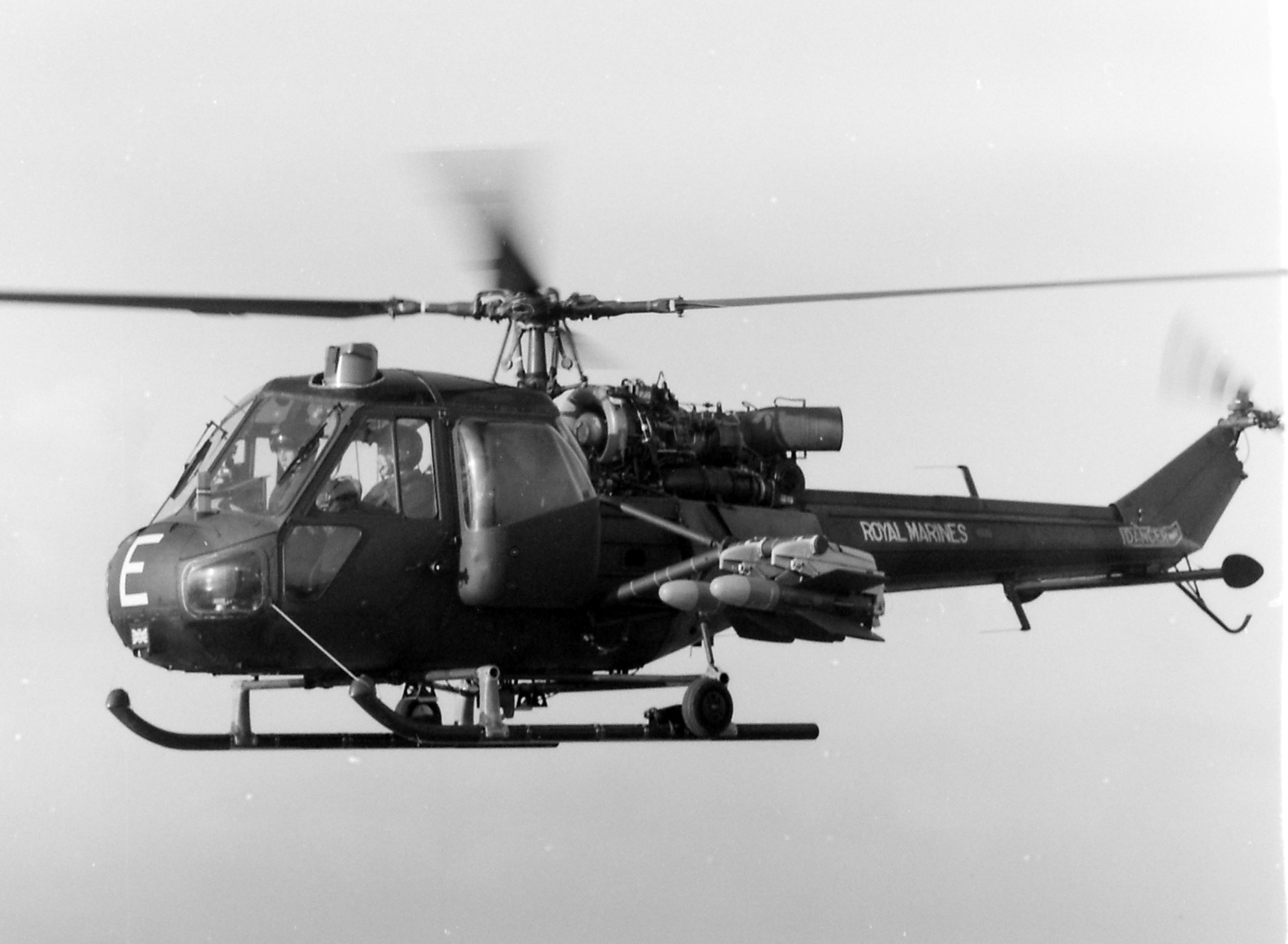
3 Commando Brigade Air Squadron Scout fitted with SS.11 guided missiles, as used in the Falklands.

On 14 June during the Battle of Mount Tumbledown, an Argentine 105 mm (4.1 in) pack howitzer battery, dug in to the west of Stanley Racecourse, was firing at the Scots Guards as they approached Mount Tumbledown. As these guns were out of range of the Milan antitank guided weapons of nearby 2 Para, their second in command, Major Chris Keeble, contacted Capt J G Greenhalgh of 656 Sqn AAC on the radio and requested a helicopter armed action (HELARM) using SS.11 missiles to attack them. As he was engaged in ammunition re-supply, his Scout was not fitted with missile booms (to reduce weight and increase the aircraft lift capability). Greenhalgh then returned to Estancia House, where his aircraft was refueled, fitted out, and armed with four missiles in 20 minutes with the rotors still turning. An 'orders group' was then held with the crews of two Scouts of 3 CBAS and Captain Greenhalgh took off on a reconnaissance mission, while the other aircraft were fitted out and readied. Within 20 minutes, he had located the target and carried out a detailed reconnaissance of the area. He fired two missiles at the enemy positions and then returned to a pre-arranged rendezvous to meet up and guide in the other two Scouts. The three aircraft, positioned 100 m (330 ft) apart, then fired a total of ten missiles (nine missiles hit, one failed) from the ridge overlooking the Argentine positions 3,000 m (9,800 ft) away and succeeded in hitting the howitzers, nearby bunkers, an ammunition dump and the command post. The Argentine troops returned mortar fire, a round landing directly in front of Greenhalgh's Scout.

== 1995 transfer to Royal Navy ==
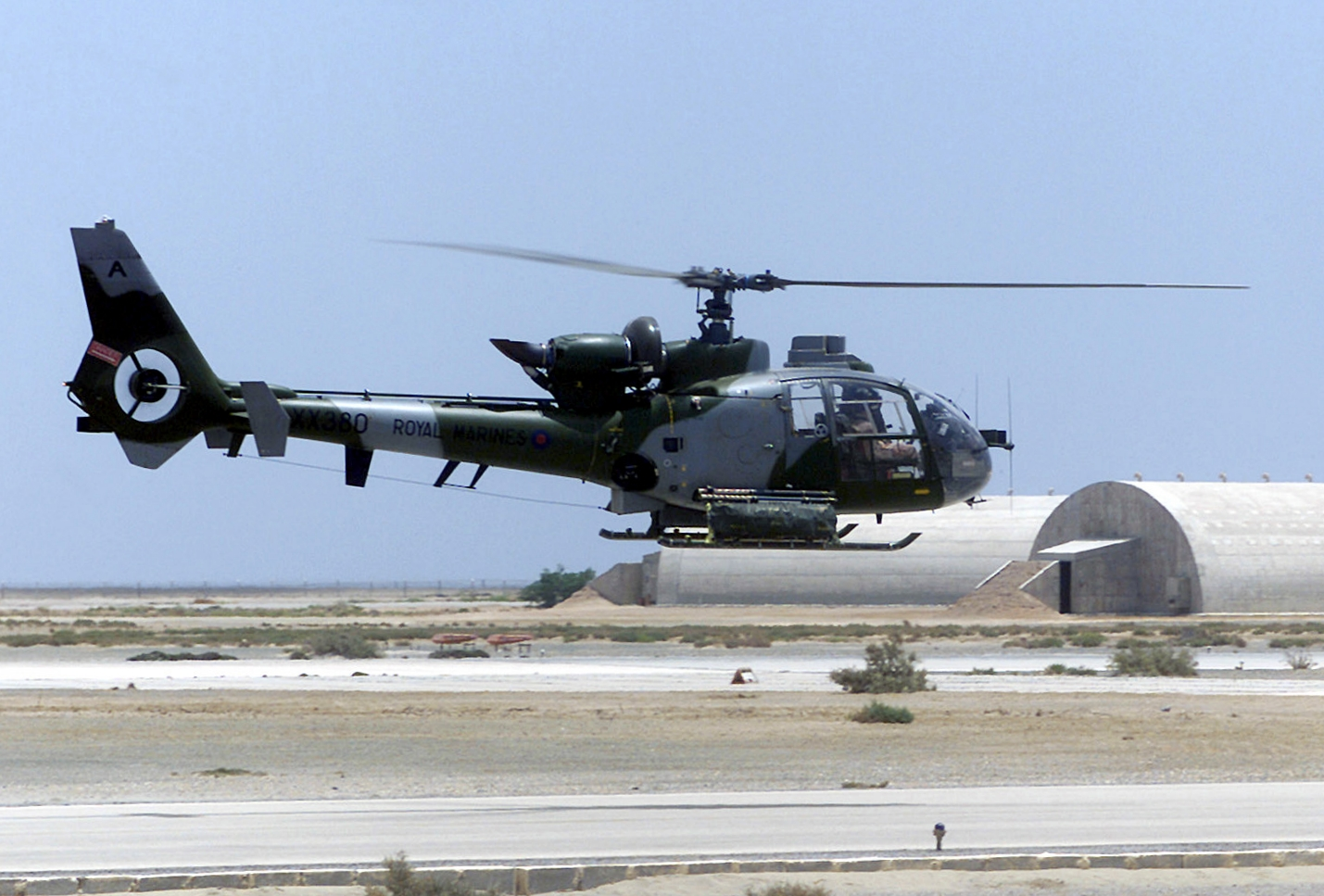
Former 3 CBAS Gazelle in service with 847 NAS in Oman, 2002

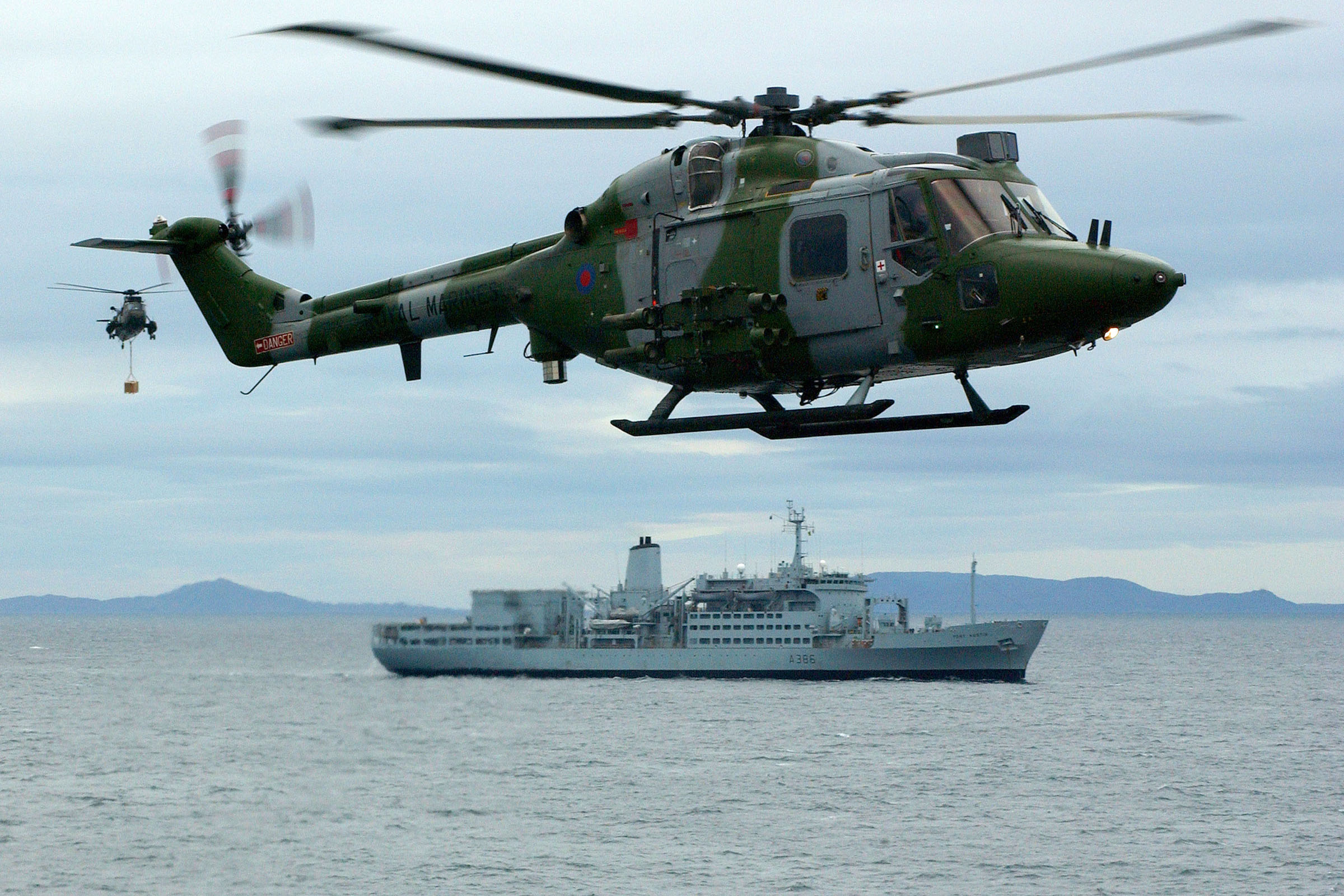
Former 3 CBAS Lynx AH.7, in service with 847 NAS in 2005

847 Naval Air Squadron was reformed at RNAS Yeovilton with Royal Marines aircrews and REME engineers on 1 September 1995, from 3 Commando Brigade Air Squadron, as a tactical support unit for the Royal Marines Commandos with Lynx AH.7 and Gazelle AH.1 helicopters.
