= John Moffat (Royal Navy officer) =

Royal Navy officer

Lieutenant-Commander John Moffat
- Born: 22 June 1919; Swinton, Scottish Borders
- Died: 11 December 2016 (aged 97); Perth, Scotland
- Military career
- Allegiance: United Kingdom
- Branch: Royal Navy
- Service years: 1938–1946
- Rank: Lieutenant-Commander
- Nickname: "Jock"
- Units: 759 Naval Air Squadron; 818 Naval Air Squadron; 820 Naval Air Squadron; 824 Naval Air Squadron
- Conflicts: Second World War: Battle of the Atlantic; Operation Rheinübung

John William Charlton Moffat (22 June 1919 – 11 December 2016) was a Scottish Royal Navy Fleet Air Arm pilot, widely credited as the pilot whose torpedo crippled the German battleship Bismarck and author of the biographical I sank the Bismarck. Moffat took part in the courageous strike on the German battleship Bismarck during its Atlantic sortie, codenamed Operation Rheinübung, on 26 May 1941 whilst flying a Fairey Swordfish biplane.

== Early life and family ==
John Moffat was born in the village of Swinton in the Scottish Borders county, to Mary and Peter Moffat. When he was a child his parents moved to Earlston where his father opened the first garage.

John's father, Peter, had served in the Royal Navy during the First World War, joining in 1914 to qualify as an aeronautical engineer for the Royal Naval Air Service (RNAS). He served in No. 2 Wing RNAS under Wing Commander Charles Rumney Samson, the first man to fly an aircraft off a ship. He served in Belgium and was posted to the seaplane carrier, HMS Ark Royal, which sailed to the Mediterranean to take part in the Gallipoli Campaign. Peter left the service in 1917 and married Mary in 1918.

Mary Moffat was an amateur opera singer. Moffat's mother encouraged him to take up playing musical instruments. Owing to this, John learned to play the violin and piano by the age of 10. During his teenage life Moffat took up equestrianism and followed the riders during fox hunting, which "did not go down well with his parents". In 1929 Moffat saw an Avro 504 aircraft fly over Kelso, triggering a lifelong passion for flying. The pilot was offering rides for 10 shillings. Moffat described the pilot as a Biggles look-alike and was impressed by him. Moffat flew that day for the first time. Moffat described his feeling of his first flight:

As for the experience of flying, I was astounded by it. This was like riding in the locomotive but infinitely more thrilling. There was the noise, the smell of hot oil and high-octane petrol [fuel], and the speed seemed immense as we took off into the air, high above the countryside, with the town far below us. It was the stuff of dreams, like a glimpse of another world that made it impossible, once I was back on the ground, to view my surroundings in the same way again... Now that I think about it, that pilot has an enormous amount to answer for.

Moffat passed the entrance examination for Kelso High School and finished his preliminary education there. Moffat excelled at rugby and was selected for the school's first team. Moffat had wanted to go to the University of Edinburgh but owing to the Wall Street crash of 1929, the Moffats could not afford the university tuition fees. Moffat applied for a bursary, took examinations and attended interviews, but failed to make the grade and was not offered assistance. Moffat had no choice but to leave school at 16, to make his living working for a bus company, which he disliked, and using his musical talents playing at weddings.

By 1938, Moffat was bored with life at the bus depot and decided to apply for a position as a naval pilot in the reserve having seen an advertisement which promised to train him as a pilot while offering him a substantial wage. Moffat had not pursued a flying career earlier, believing it to beyond the aspirations of ordinary people, but now seized the opportunity and applied to join the Fleet Air Arm.

Moffat heard nothing from the Navy and moved to London. After failing to find work in the Rhodesian police force through their High Commission in London, he received a letter from the Navy offering him a part-time job in the reserves. Moffat accepted the Navy's offer and was ordered to report to HMS Frobisher in Portsmouth.

Moffat had been on leave in Kelso on 1 September 1939 when Germany invaded Poland. On 3 September 1939 Great Britain and France declared war on Germany. The following day, Moffat was ordered to the St Vincent Barracks Gosport, on the west side of Portsmouth Harbour, which was one of the Royal Navy Boy's Training Establishments.

== Fleet Air Arm ==
=== Early career ===
In December 1939 Moffat moved to a flying school in Belfast. By the time of the fall of France in June 1940, Moffat had completed his training and was based with 759 Squadron at Eastleigh. Before the Battle of Britain he had two encounters with enemy aircraft. While test flying a Gloster Gladiator, testing an improvised oxygen system, Moffat reached 29,000 ft. During the descent he was attacked by Messerschmitt Bf 109s but he escaped into clouds without damage. Soon afterwards, he was also engaged by a Heinkel He 111 while test flying an unarmed Blackburn Skua. Moffat reported the event to a Hawker Hurricane unit (not specified) which scrambled to intercept.

In July 1940, Moffat's Squadron took part in the attack on Mers-el-Kébir, although Moffat himself did not travel with the carrier Ark Royal for the attack. Later that autumn, Moffat joined 818 Squadron.

=== Attack on Bismarck ===
On 24 May 1941, the German battleship Bismarck sank the Royal Navy's flagship HMS Hood, and damaged out of action HMS Prince of Wales. The torpedo-bomber carrier HMS Ark Royal received an order, as part of Force H, to hunt down Bismarck and sink her.

On 26 May 1941 Bismarck was running for the safety of the French port of Brest to make repairs to light damage that she had received from the clash with Prince of Wales, and a last-ditch attempt to slow her down with an airborne torpedo attack from Ark Royal's aircraft was ordered that night so that the pursuing Royal Navy's heavy ships could catch up with her.

In evening twilight at 9.05 P.M., amid gale-force winds, Moffat and his observer, T/S-Lt.(A) J. D. "Dusty" Miller, and telegraphist/air gunner (TAG) LA A. J. Hayman, flying in the Fairey Swordfish 5C/L9726 together with 14 other Swordfish attacked Bismarck amidst a torrent of anti-aircraft fire being put up by the ship's guns.

Two torpedoes struck home, one amidships against her port side resulting in slow flooding, and the second in the steering area. Her rudders were consequently jammed in a turning position, and although she was still underway at good speed, she was directionless in the water. Attempts to steer by varying the speed of the three propellers failed.

With Bismarck's steering control jammed, the Royal Navy's Force H and Home Fleet were able to catch up with her, surround her and subject her to extensive shelling and torpedoing, after which she turned over and sank the following morning.

The wreck of the Bismarck was discovered in 1989.

At the time of the attack no definitive statement of whose torpedo had hit the Bismarck was released, however following the observation of this wreck historian Mike Rossiter credited John Moffat as by far the most likely, through analysis of the flight paths. However, the son of another Swordfish pilot that attacked the Bismarck, Kenneth Pattisson, believes that it was his father who damaged the ship.

== After the war ==
Moffat left the Navy in 1946 and returned to Glasgow. He went to college in Glasgow to get a business degree and also achieved a diploma in hotel management. Moffat had stopped flying after leaving the Navy. In his 60s, after 40 years, he began flying again. He celebrated his 90th birthday in June 2009 by performing aerobatics in a light aircraft.

In 2010, his book I Sank the Bismarck (ISBN 9780552159487), co-written with documentary writer Mike Rossiter, was released.

Moffat died on 11 December 2016 at the age of 97.
