= 21st Naval TBR Wing =

Royal Navy Fleet Air Arm aircraft wing

- White Ensign
- Active: 25 October 1943 – 30 June 1944
- Country: United Kingdom
- Branch: Royal Navy
- Type: Naval TBR Wing
- Role: Carrier-based Torpedo, bomber and reconnaissance
- Size: Two squadrons
- Part of: Fleet Air Arm
- Aircraft carrier: HMS Illustrious
- Engagements: World War II: Indian Ocean in World War II; Operation Initial; Operation Diplomat; Operation Cockpit; Operation Pedal

Aircraft flown
- Bomber: Fairey Barracuda Mk.II

21st Naval TBR Wing ("21 Wing") was a Fleet Air Arm formation of the Royal Navy during the Second World War. Formed in October 1943 with 810 and 847 Naval Air Squadrons, it operated Fairey Barracuda torpedo and dive bomber aircraft from the aircraft carrier HMS Illustrious and shore bases in Ceylon during the Wing's service with the Eastern Fleet. The Wing was disbanded on 30 June 1944, when 847 Naval Air Squadron was absorbed into 810 Naval Air Squadron.

== History ==
=== Formation and organisation ===
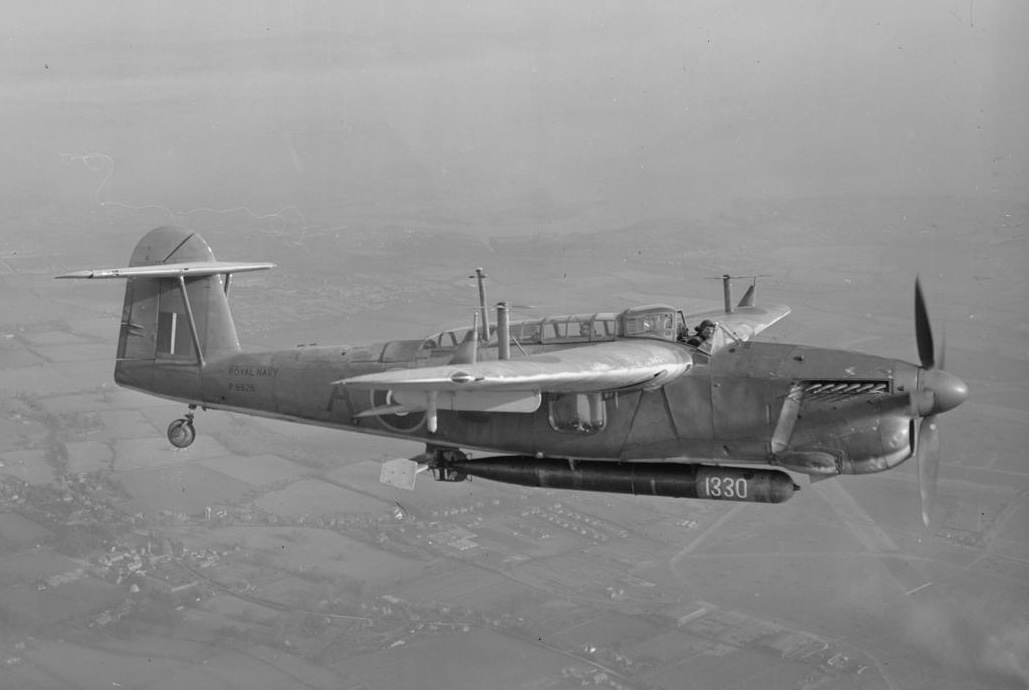
Fairey Barracuda; of the type used by 21 Wing's squadrons

Commencing in October 1943, all squadrons designated for deployment aboard a specific aircraft carrier were incorporated into a Wing structure. Ultimately, nineteen such wings were established, comprising two distinct categories: fighter wings and torpedo-bomber reconnaissance wings. This organisational framework pertained exclusively to embarked squadrons and the compositional structure of each wing demonstrated considerable variability in terms of unit quantity. The designation "Naval" was obligatory to preclude potential ambiguity with Royal Air Force units.

The 21st Naval TBR Wing was formed at RNAS Machrihanish, Argyll and Bute, on 25 October 1943, comprising 810 and 847 Naval Air Squadrons, both equipped with Fairey Barracuda, a British torpedo and dive bomber aicraft. The Wing was intended for service aboard the name ship of her class of aircraft carrier HMS Illustrious as part of the carrier's strike and reconnaissance component.

The first commander was Lieutenant Commander N.R. Corbet-Milward, RN, appointed on the date of formation. Lieutenant Commander B.E. Boulding, DSC, RN, succeeded him on 18 November 1943. On 27 February 1944, Lieutenant Commander(A) A.J.B. Forde, RN, took command and remained in post until the Wing was disbanded.

=== Operation Initial ===
On 8 March 1944, HMS Illustrious joined other Eastern Fleet vessels for Operation Initial, a sweep around the Bay of Bengal intended to demonstrate the fleet's presence and provide operational training. As part of the adjustment of the carrier's aircraft complement for the deployment, nine Fairey Barracudas from 847 Naval Air Squadron were disembarked to RN Air Section China Bay, at RAF China Bay, Ceylon. Twelve Fairey Barracudas, together with 27 Vought Corsairs, remained aboard HMS Illustrious for the operation.

=== Operation Diplomat ===
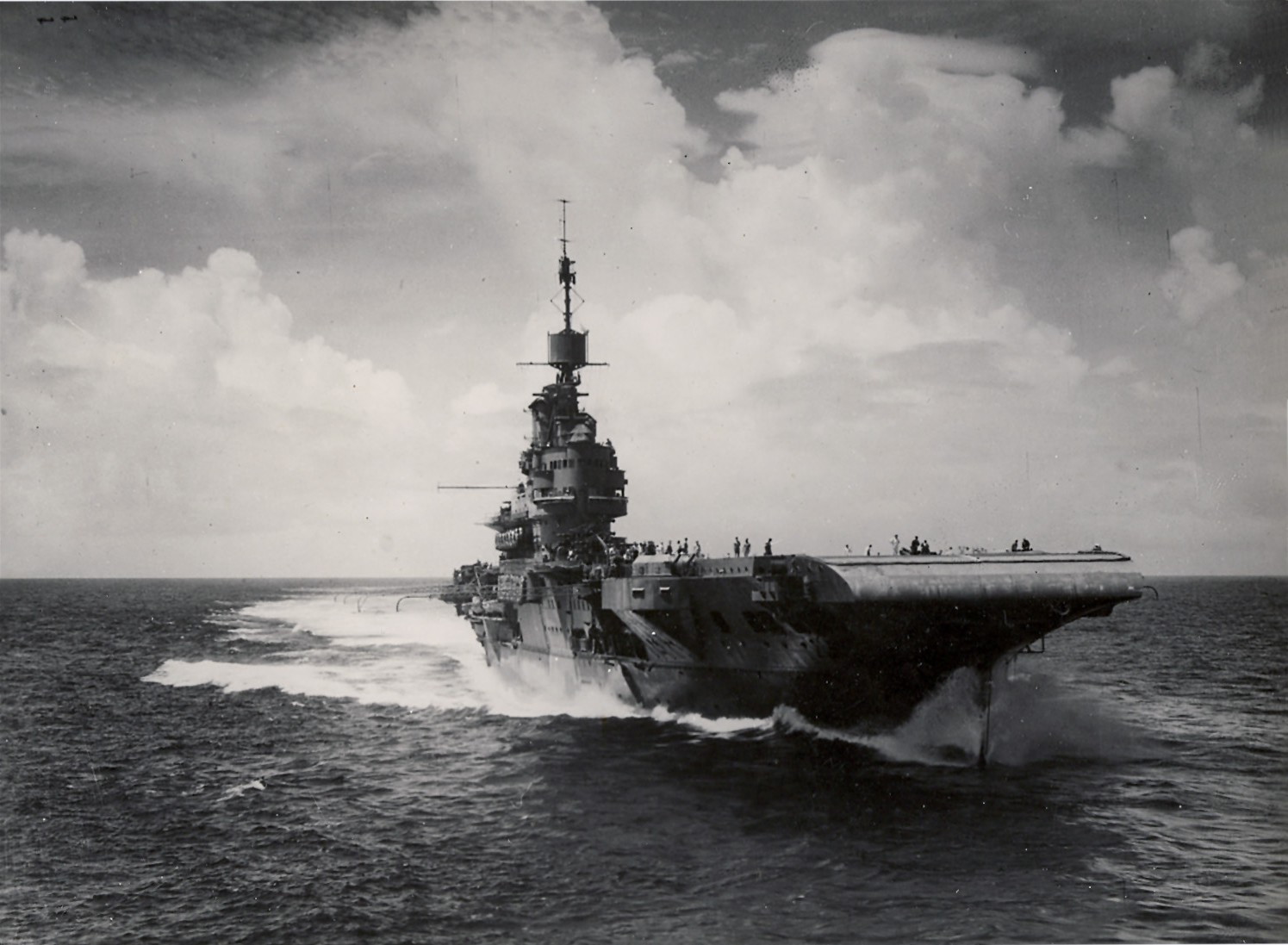
HMS Illustrious in the Indian Ocean, while operating with the USN's USS Saratoga

In late March 1944, HMS Illustrious deployed with other Eastern Fleet units to meet the US Navy's aircraft carrier USS Saratoga, which was joining the fleet for future operations. The rendezvous took place south-west of the Cocos Islands on 27 March. The deployment included exercises and exchanges of deck-landing experience between the British and American carriers, and the ships returned to Trincomalee, Ceylon, in early April.

=== Operation Cockpit ===
On 19 April 1944, HMS Illustrious and USS Saratoga launched air strikes against Japanese installations at Sabang, northern Sumatra. The attack, known as Operation Cockpit, was carried out as part of the Eastern Fleet's offensive operations in the Indian Ocean. The Wing operated alongside aircraft from the aircraft carriers' other squadrons.

=== Operation Pedal ===
On 19 June 1944, HMS Illustrious launched air attacks against the harbour and airfield at Port Blair in the Andaman Islands during Operation Pedal. Fifteen Fairey Barracudas from 21 Wing took part, comprising nine from 810 Squadron and six from 847 Squadron. This was the Wing's final major operation before its disbandment at the end of the month.

=== Disbandment ===
The 21st Naval TBR Wing was disbanded on 30 June 1944. Rather than continuing as a combined formation, its two squadrons were consolidated when 847 Naval Air Squadron was absorbed into 810 Naval Air Squadron. The Wing's operational service with the Eastern Fleet therefore ended after the Port Blair strike in June.

== Squadrons ==
The Wing comprised two squadrons throughout its operational existence:

- 810 Naval Air Squadron, (1943 - 1944)
- 847 Naval Air Squadron, (1943 - 1944)

== Naval air stations and carrier deployments ==
The 21st Naval TBR Wing was based initially in the United Kingdom before deploying with the Eastern Fleet in the Indian Ocean. Its two squadrons, 810 and 847 Naval Air Squadrons, operated primarily from HMS Illustrious, with detachments ashore in Ceylon during the deployment.

- Royal Naval Air Station Machrihanish (HMS Landrail), Argyll and Bute.
  - The Wing was formed on 25 October 1943, comprising 810 and 847 Naval Air Squadrons, both equipped with Fairey Barracudas.
- HMS Illustrious
  - Both squadrons embarked on 27 November 1943. The aircraft carrier sailed for the Eastern Fleet on 30 December and reached Ceylon in January 1944, joining the fleet at Trincomalee, Ceylon, on 31 January.
- RN Air Section China Bay (HMS Bambara), Ceylon.
  - On 8 March 1944, during Operation Initial, nine Fairey Barracudas from 847 Naval Air Squadron were flown ashore to RN Air Section China Bay, while 810 Squadron remained aboard HMS Illustrious. The detachment formed part of the Wing's deployment with the Eastern Fleet.
- HMS Illustrious
  - The squadrons continued operations from the aircraft carrier during the Eastern Fleet's deployments in April and June 1944. The carrier took part in Operations Cockpit and Pedal; for Operation Transom in May, the Wing's Fairey Barracudas did not participate in the strike against Surabaya, for which Grumman Avenger-equipped squadrons were used instead.
- RN Air Section China Bay (HMS Bambara), Ceylon.
  - The Wing was disbanded on 30 June 1944, when 847 Naval Air Squadron was absorbed into 810 Naval Air Squadron.

== Aircraft ==
The wing's two constituent squadrons operated with one type of torpedo bomber aircraft:

- Fairey Barracuda Mk II torpedo and dive bomber (1943 - 1944)

== Wing leaders ==
The wing's recorded commanding officer chronology was:

- Lieutenant Commander N.R. Corbet-Milward, RN, from 25 October 1943
- Lieutenant Commander B.E. Boulding, DSC, RN, from 18 November 1943
- Lieutenant Commander(A) A.J.B. Forde, RN, from 27 February 1944,
- disbanded - 30 June 1944

Note: Abbreviation (A) signifies Air Branch of the RN or RNVR.

== See also ==
- Fleet Air Arm
- List of aircraft wings of the Royal Navy
- 810 Naval Air Squadron
- 847 Naval Air Squadron
- HMS Illustrious
- Eastern Fleet

== Bibliography ==
- Ballance, Thetford; Howard, Christopher; Sturtivant, Ray (2016). The Squadrons and Units of the Fleet Air Arm. Air-Britain (Historians) Ltd. ISBN 978-0-85130-489-2.
- Wragg, David (2019). The Fleet Air Arm Handbook 1939–1945. The History Press. ISBN 978-0-7509-9303-6.
