= Kenneth Pattisson =

Royal Navy officer and Fleet Air Arm pilot (1916–2002)

Kenneth Pattisson DSC
- Born: 12 December 1916
- Died: 13 July 2002 (aged 85)
- Military career
- Allegiance: United Kingdom
- Branch: Royal Navy
- Service years: 1938–1958
- Rank: Lieutenant Commander
- Commands: 810 Naval Air Squadron (1949-51); 815 Naval Air Squadron (1947-49)
- Conflicts: Second World War: Battle of the Atlantic; Korean War
- Awards: Distinguished Service Cross

Kenneth Pattisson, DSC, (12 December 1916 – 13 July 2002), was a Royal Navy officer and a Fleet Air Arm pilot credited by some (most notably his own son) with fatally crippling the German battleship Bismarck on 26 May 1941 whilst flying a Fairey Swordfish biplane torpedo bomber. Pattisson was awarded the Distinguished Service Cross for his service during the war.

At the time of the attack no official statement was made as to whose torpedo hit Bismarck. Following the recovery of Bismarck in 1998, many historians and the official Royal Navy press release credit John Moffat with that attack

== Early life ==
Born on 12 December 1916, Pattisson grew up in Southsea, Hampshire, and then moved to the Isle of Wight. He attended Newport Grammar School.

== Royal Navy career ==
Pattisson took a short-service commission in the Fleet Air Arm in the last months of peace prior to the Second World War.

=== Second World War and the attack on Bismarck ===
After Germany sank HMS Hood, a number of Royal Navy ships were tasked with the destruction of the German battleship Bismarck. Amongst these was the aircraft carrier HMS Ark Royal where Sub-Lieutenant Pattisson was stationed. On 26 May 1941, the Royal Air Force spotted Bismarck 70 miles (110 km) from Ark Royal. Pattisson's squadron was launched to intercept, but poor weather made identification difficult and the squadron targeted the British HMS Sheffield by mistake. Of the 14 planes in the attack, only three pilots, including Pattisson, recognised the silhouette as that of Sheffield and not Bismarck and held their fire. Later that evening, another sortie of 15 aircraft was launched and Bismarck was attacked. Two torpedoes struck home, one amidships on its port side resulting in slow flooding, and the second in the steering area. Without the ability to hold a course, Bismarck was unable to reach port. After being attacked by other British ships, Bismarck was scuttled by her crew to avoid capture.

=== Later career ===
He later held technical appointments involving aircraft testing and air-gunnery work. By the outbreak of the Korean War in 1950, he was commanding a Fairey Firefly squadron and serving as Lieutenant Commander responsible for flying operations aboard the aircraft carrier HMS Theseus. After converting to jet aircraft, he occupied the equivalent post aboard HMS Illustrious.

He retired from the Royal Navy in 1958 with the rank of Lieutenant Commander, having completed more than 400 sorties at sea. He then devoted as much time as possible to sailing off the Dorset coast. He married Peggy in 1939. Together, they had two sons and two daughters.

Kenneth Pattison, pilot, died 13 July 2002.

== Retirement and personal life ==
He retired from the Navy, as a lieutenant-commander in 1958, after more than 400 sorties at sea.

He was married in 1939 and had two sons and two daughters.
