= 810 Naval Air Squadron =

Inactive flying squadron of the Royal Navy's Fleet Air Arm

- Squadron badge
- Active: Royal Air Force; 1933–1939; Royal Navy: 1939–1944; 1944–1945; 1947–1949; 1949–1951; 1951–1953; 1954–1955; 1955–1956; 1959–1960; 1983–2001
- Disbanded: 31 July 2001
- Country: United Kingdom
- Branch: Royal Navy
- Type: Torpedo Bomber Reconnaissance squadron
- Role: Carrier-based: anti-submarine warfare (ASW); anti-surface warfare (ASuW); Close air support (CAS); Anti-Submarine Operational Flying School
- Part of: Fleet Air Arm
- Mottos: Ut fulmina de caelo (Latin for 'Like thunderbolts from heaven')
- Aircraft: See Aircraft flown section for full list.
- Engagements: World War II; Korean War; Suez Crisis
- Battle honours: Norway 1940; Mediterranean 1940-41; Spartivento 1940; Atlantic 1941; 'Bismarck' 1941; Diego Suarez 1942; Salerno 1943; East Indies 1944; Korea 1951-53

Insignia
- Squadron Badge Description: Blue, in a base two bars barry wavy white dexter chief a cloud proper issuant towards sinister base a lightning flash gold (1937)
- Identifications Markings: 01-09, 1-3 (Dart/Ripon/Baffin); 523-537 (Baffin July 1936); 523-537 (Shark/Swordfish); A2A+ (Swordfish May 1939); 2A+ (Swordfish later); 2A+ (Barracuda); N6A+ (Barracuda February 1945); 231-240 (Firefly); 230-238 (Firefly June 1951); 100-112 (Sea Fury); 170-179 (Sea Hawk); 230-239 (Sea Hawk January 1956); 230-236 (Gannet); 501-510 (Sea King); 133-134 (Sea King OEU July 1993); 512 & 514 (Sea King OEU January 1994)
- Fin Carrier/Shore Codes: T (Firefly); O:R:T (Firefly June 1951); C (Sea Fury); Z (Sea Hawk); Z:B (Sea Hawk January 1956); C (Gannet); CU (Sea King); BD (Sea King OEU)

810 Naval Air Squadron (810 NAS), often referred to as 810 Squadron, is an inactive Fleet Air Arm (FAA) naval air squadron of the United Kingdom's Royal Navy (RN). It most recently operated the Westland Sea King HAS.6 anti-submarine warfare helicopter between October 1989 and July 2001, based at RNAS Culdrose, Cornwall and notably later during that period in the helicopter Operational Evaluation Unit (OEU) role.

It formed on 3 April 1933 with the amalgamation of the 12 Blackburn Dart aircraft from 463 and 44 Flight (Fleet Torpedo) Flights Royal Air Force to the Fleet Air Arm. The squadron engaged in combat during the Second World War, utilising the Fairey Swordfish and Fairey Barracuda. It subsequently flew the Fairey Firefly throughout the Korean War, which was later succeeded by the Hawker Sea Fury in the mid-fifties. During the Suez Crisis, the squadron operated with the Hawker Sea Hawk.

== History ==
=== Pre war (1933-1939) ===
810 Naval Air Squadron was established at RAF Gosport, Hampshire, on 3 April 1933, through the merger of Nos. 463 and 464 (Fleet Torpedo) Flights.

Equipped with twelve Blackburn Dart biplane torpedo bomber aircraft 810 Squadron was assigned to the aircraft carrier HMS Courageous in May 1933 and formed part of the Home Fleet. In September that year the Darts were replaced by Blackburn Ripon torpedo bombers, and these were in turn replaced by Blackburn Baffin torpedo bombers in July 1934, with the entire squadron operating Baffins by November that year. The Abyssinian crisis caused HMS Courageous and the squadron to be transferred to the Mediterranean from August 1935 to February 1936. The squadron received Blackburn Shark torpedo bombers in April 1937, and then Fairey Swordfish a torpedo bomber aircraft in September 1938. 810 Squadron was then transferred to the new aircraft carrier HMS Ark Royal the following month, and had embarked by January.

The squadron was amongst those transferred to the Admiralty, when it took control of the FAA on 24 May 1939.

=== Second World War (1939-1945) ===
By the outbreak of war the squadron was embarked in HMS Ark Royal, flying twelve Fairey Swordfish on anti-submarine patrols. They carried out an unsuccessful attack on U-30 on 14 September 1939, losing two of their aircraft to their own bombs. The squadron was involved in activities over Norway after the German invasion in April 1940, and carried out bombing raids on Vaernes aerodrome. They sailed with HMS Ark Royal to Gibraltar, and carried out attacks during the British attack on Mers-el-Kébir in July. The squadron made an abortive attack on the French battleship Strasbourg, and later attacked the French battleship Dunkerque.

The squadron was again in action in August and September, when they carried out bombing raids at Cagliari and Sardinia, and against the French fleet in the Battle of Dakar, when their aircraft made an unsuccessful attack on the French battleship Richelieu. They then saw action in November at the Battle of Cape Spartivento, and the following year in February carried out bombing attacks on Tirso Dam, Sardinia and bombing attacks on Livorno and La Spezia in Italy.

HMS Ark Royal was ordered into the Atlantic in May 1941 to search for the German battleship Bismarck, and the squadron was involved in the attack which crippled her, and led to her sinking. This was followed by a period in the Mediterranean to support Malta operations and to operate against enemy positions on Sardinia. They left HMS Ark Royal in September, before her sinking in November, and saw service with HMS Furious supporting convoy movements to Jamaica. In December 810 Squadron embarked in the name ship of her class HMS Illustrious and then transferred to sister ship HMS Formidable to return to the UK.

In March 1942, the squadron was transferred to HMS Illustrious for missions in the Indian Ocean. Subsequently, they participated in the Battle of Madagascar in May, targeting both shipping and land installations at Diego Suarez, and successfully sinking the Vichy French submarine Le Heros. Disembarking to the RN Air Section Durban, at SAAF Station Stamford Hill, Durban, the squadron absorbed 829 Naval Air Squadron thereby increasing its strength. 810 returned to the UK in February 1943.

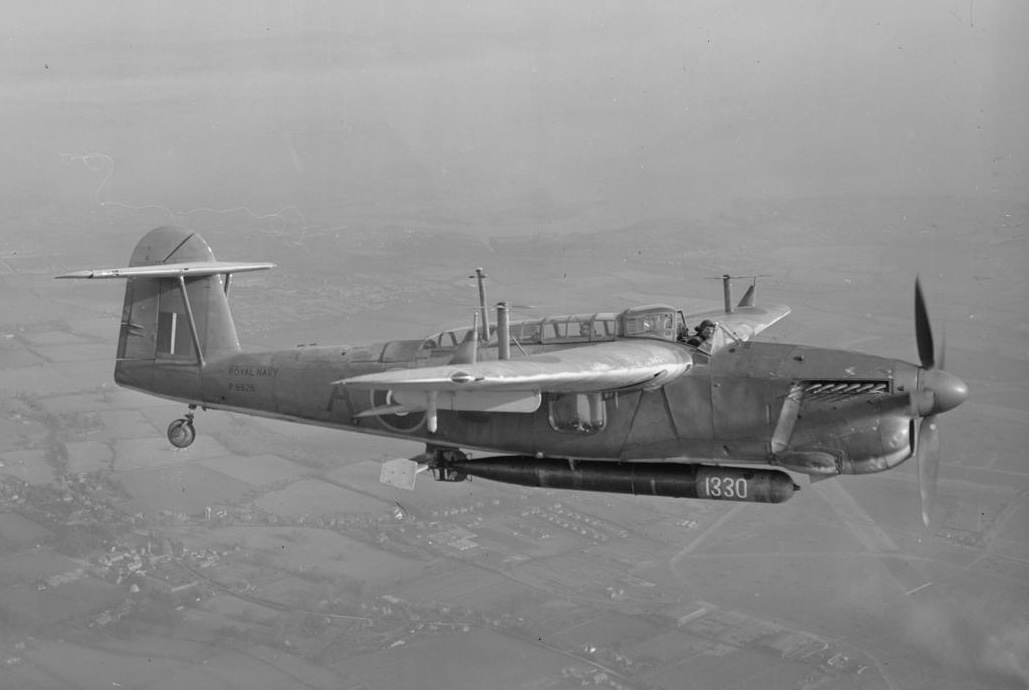
A Barracuda Mk II; an example of the type used by 810 Squadron

In April 1943, 810 squadron was re-equipped at RNAS Lee-on-Solent (HMS Daedalus), Hampshire, with twelve Fairey Barracuda Mk IIs, transforming into a Torpedo, Bomber, Reconnaissance (TBR) squadron. Following a period of work-up both ashore and aboard HMS Illustrious, operations commenced off the Norwegian coast in July, prior to their deployment to support the Salerno landings, Operation Avalanche. Upon returning to the United Kingdom, the squadron reassembled as a component of the 21st Naval TBR Wing in October, and subsequently embarked the next month for the Far East to join the Royal Navy's Eastern Fleet. Subsequent to the fleet's integration in March, a three-day operation referred to as Operation Initial was carried out in the Bay of Bengal to showcase military presence in the area and to support training for the Fleet. This was followed by another naval training exercise called Operation Diplomat.

Following this, the squadron and wing engaged in active operations from April to July 1944. Operation Cockpit, which took place from 16 April to 19, involved air strikes executed by the Fleet Air Arm and United States Navy aircraft. These strikes targeted the harbor infrastructure, oil storage tanks, shipping vessels, aircraft, and facilities at Lho Nga airfield in Sabang, located on the island of Pulau Weh at the northern tip of Sumatra. Operation Councillor took place from June 10 to June 13 as a strategic initiative in the Indian Ocean, aimed at redirecting Japanese attention from American military operations in the Marianas Islands. Operation Pedal took place from June 19 to June 21 and included an airstrike initiated from aircraft carriers aimed at Japanese facilities located in Port Blair and several locations throughout the Andaman Islands in the Bay of Bengal. Finally, Operation Crimson, which took place from July 22 to 27, involved a coordinated naval bombardment and aerial attacks aimed at Japanese airfields situated in the Indonesian cities of Sabang, Lhoknga, and Kutaraja on the island of Sumatra. Aircraft launched from carriers were instrumental in incapacitating the airfields and providing air support for the forces involved in the bombardment.

847 Squadron was integrated in June 1944, achieving a maximum strength of twenty-one aircraft, prior to disembarking at RNAS Wingfield (HMS Malagas), Cape Town, during the carrier's refitting process, however, the squadron returned to the UK aboard the escort carrier HMS Activity.

The Barracuda Mk IIs remained operational at RNAS Burscough (HMS Ringtail), Lancashire, during the winter of 1944/45; however, they were subsequently substituted with radar-equipped Barracuda Mk IIIs at RNAS Stretton (HMS Blackcap), Cheshire, in February 1945. 810 Squadron relocated to RAF Thorney Island, West Sussex, to test the new equipment during anti-shipping patrols in the English Channel alongside RAF Coastal Command. In April, it transitioned to the East Coast to conduct searches for midget submarines in the Schelde region, operating from RAF Beccles, Suffolk and remaining under RAF Coastal Command. Subsequently, it proceeded north to Scotland, where it was disbanded at RNAS Machrihanish (HMS Landrail), Argyll and Bute, on 22 August.,

=== Firefly (1947-1953) ===
The inaugural production Fairey Firefly FR.Mk 4 took to the skies on 25 May 1945, with the first squadron of the Royal Navy's Fleet Air Arm to receive the Firefly Mk.4 was 810. The addition of the two-speed, two-stage supercharged Rolls-Royce Griffon 74 improved high-altitude performance, increasing maximum speed by 50 miles per hour (80 km/h). This prompted the switch to a four-bladed Rotol airscrew and an extension of the fin's leading edge for enhanced stability. Two large fairings were also added beneath the wings: the port fairing held auxiliary fuel, while the starboard fairing contained the radar scanner.

In October 1947, 810 Squadron was reformed at RNAS Eglinton (HMS Gannet), County Londonderry, as a fighter squadron with twelve Firefly FR.Mk4s for the 17th Carrier Air Group. The squadron deployed on HMS Implacable for an exercise in May 1948, then spent three months at RNAS Donibristle (HMS Merlin), Fife, before rejoining HMS Theseus in August for a cruise to South Africa, including an eight-day tour. In 1949, the squadron participated in cruises in the Mediterranean and Home waters, as well as Army exercises in Germany in October, before being disbanded at RNAS St Merryn (HMS Vulture), Cornwall.

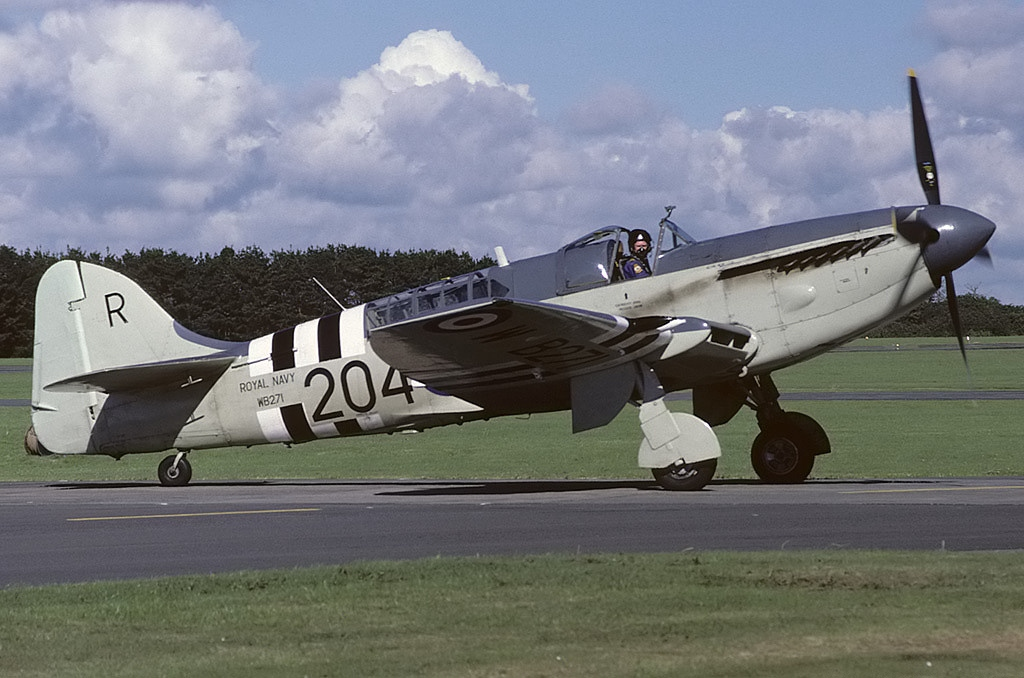
A Firefly AS.Mk 5; an example of the type used by 810 Squadron

The Firefly Mk.4 was succeeded in production by the Mk.5, which became the most widely produced variant of the later Fireflies. With this model, the Firefly started to be equipped with different tools for specialised roles, leading to the creation of subvariants such as the FR.5 for day-fighter-reconnaissance, the NF.Mk 5 for night-fighting, and the AS.Mk 5 for anti-submarine patrol. The distinctions among these Fireflies were primarily internal.

On the subsequent day, 810 Squadron was reformed into an anti-submarine squadron at the same station, operating with twelve Firefly AS.Mk 5s. This unit, which continued to be a component of the 17th CAG, transformed into a fully operational strike squadron. Two months later, it re-embarked to engage in the Korean War starting in October. Prior to its withdrawal in April 1951, the Air Group had executed a total of 3,446 sorties and was subsequently honored with the 1950 Boyd Trophy for its three operational patrols conducted from October to December.

The squadron was reformed at RNAS Arbroath (HMS Condor), Angus, on 29 June 1951 with twelve Firefly AS.Mk5s and joined HMS Ocean in July. After a brief period on HMS Glory in May and June, it returned to HMS Theseus in October and then back to HMS Ocean in December after its Korea mission. In April 1953, the squadron left for the Far East for a second six-month deployment in Korean waters, completing four operational patrols before the July armistice and three more afterward. The aircrews returned from Hong Kong in October, and the squadron was officially disbanded when the ship arrived in Plymouth on 17 December.

=== Sea Fury (1954-1955) ===
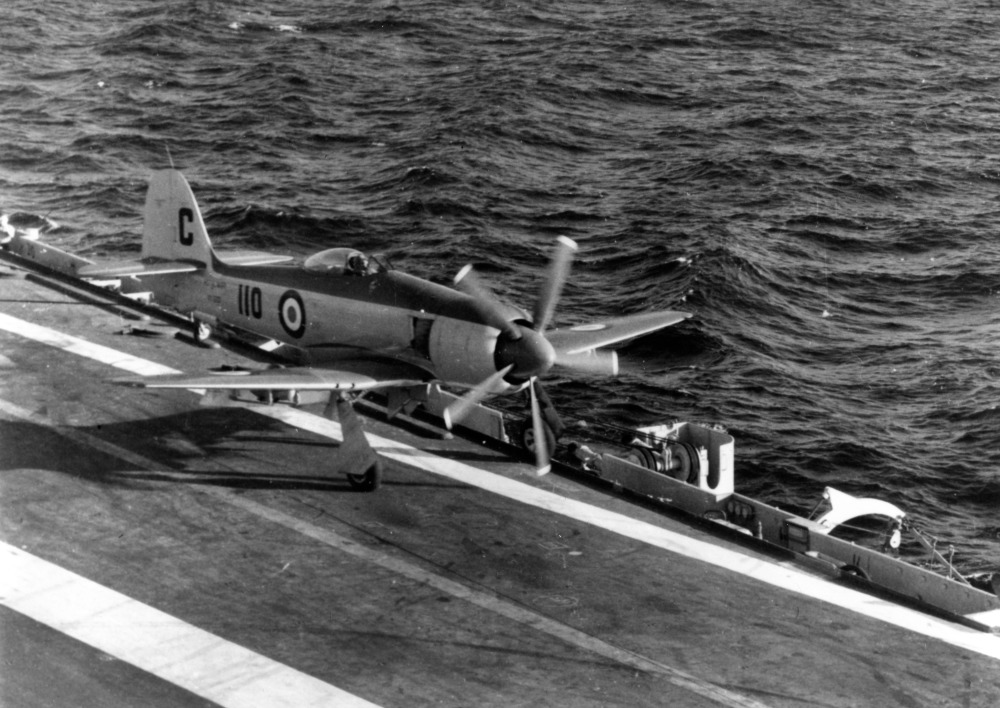
An 810 Squadron Sea Fury FB.11 aboard HMS Centaur

The Hawker Sea Fury marked the last use of a piston-engine fighter by the Fleet Air Arm in active squadrons, serving from 1947 until 1955. It was distinguished as the first British naval aircraft to incorporate power-folding wings in routine operations. The Sea Fury began its operational deployment in the late summer of 1947.

810 Squadron was subsequently re-formed into a fighter squadron, equipped with 12 Sea Fury FB.11s at RNAS Ford (HMS Peregrine), West Sussex, on 1 March 1954, and deployed in July aboard the name ship of her class HMS Centaur for operations in the Mediterranean. The aircraft returned to the UK from RNAS Hal Far (HMS Falcon), Malta, on 22 March 1955, leading to the disbandment of the squadron upon their arrival.

=== Sea Hawk (1955) ===
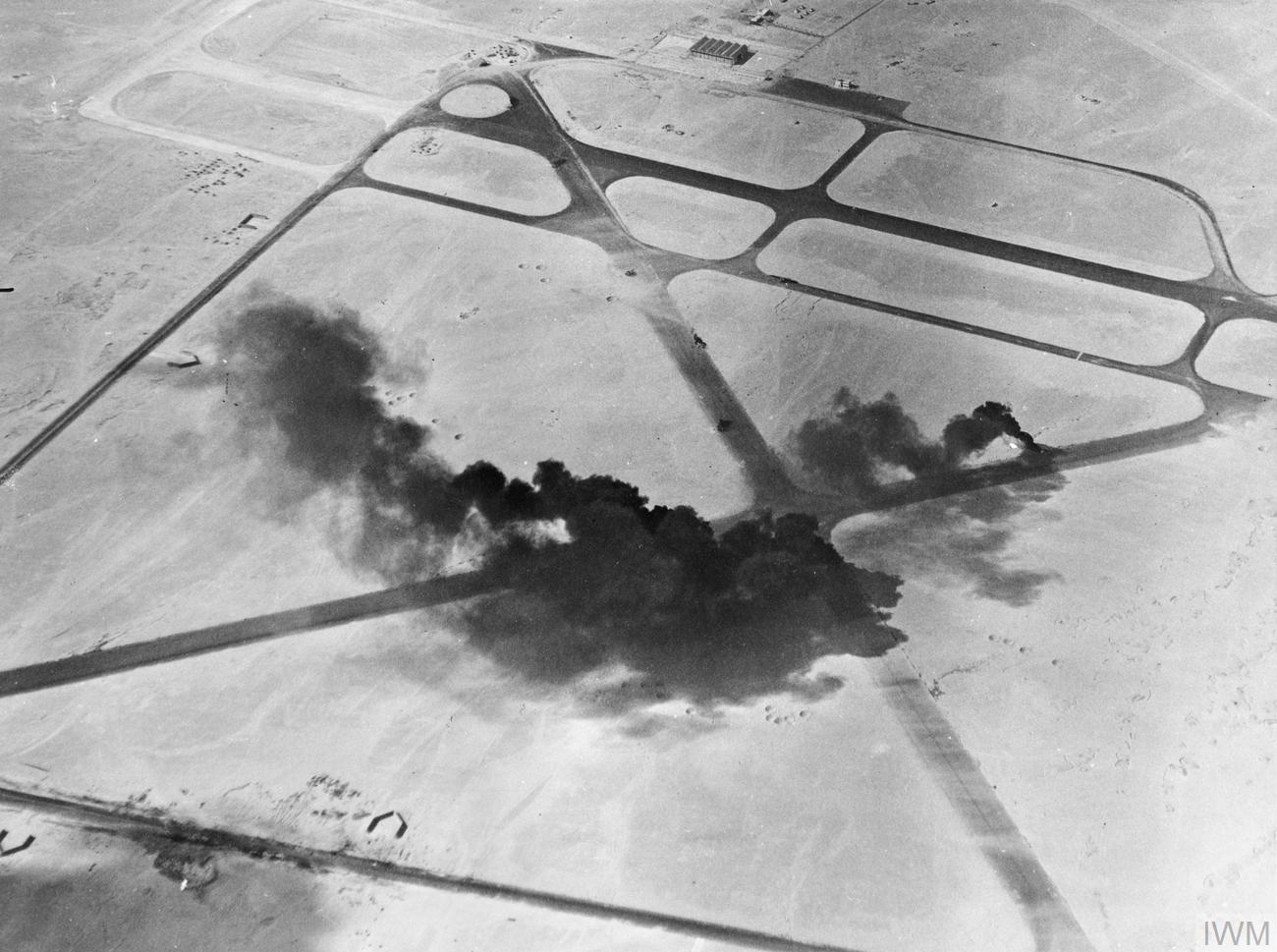
Egyptian Air Force MIG fighters burn after an attack on Inchas airfield by Sea Hawks of 810 Squadron

The Hawker Sea Hawk was first introduced to FAA squadrons in 1953, with the FGA 4 variant, which was specifically designed for close-support operations, making its first flight on 26 August 1954. The last production model for the Royal Navy was the FGA 6, and the final Sea Hawk for the FAA was delivered in early 1956.

On 4 July 1955, the squadron was re-established at RNAS Lossiemouth (HMS Fulmar), Moray, as a ground attack fighter unit, equipped with ten Sea Hawk FGA.4 aircraft. In January 1956, it embarked on the Centaur class light fleet carrier HMS Albion and set sail for the Far East. Upon its return in May, the squadron was initially scheduled to disband; however, this was deferred due to the prevailing political circumstances in the Middle East. Consequently, it departed again in August aboard sister ship HMS Bulwark for the Mediterranean, where it took part in the Suez operations in November, conducting attacks on airfields and various other targets. Upon returning home, 810 Squadron disbanded at RNAS Lee-on-Solent (HMS Daedalus), Hampshire, on 18 December.

=== Gannet (1959-1960) ===
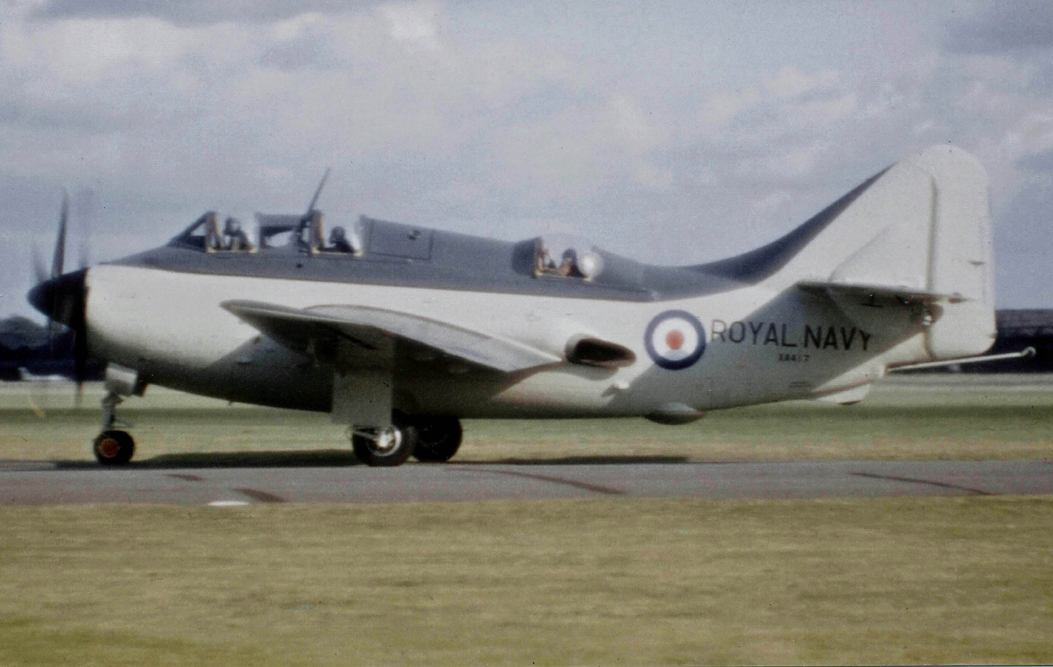
A Gannet AS.4; an example of the type used by 810 Squadron

The Fairey Gannet, which became the cornerstone of the FAA's carrier-based anti-submarine force in 1955, was the inaugural aircraft globally to operate with a dual airscrew-turbine system, offering all the advantages of a twin-engine aircraft while utilising a single-engine setup. It was the first aircraft within FAA squadrons to merge the search and strike roles: it featured an unusually spacious weapons bay, behind which a sizable retractable radar scanner was installed. On April 13, 1956, the Gannet AS.4 undertook its inaugural flight. This aircraft, which followed the AS.1 in the production line, was distinct from its predecessor due to the incorporation of the Armstrong Siddeley Double Mamba (101) ASMD.3 turboprop. With the introduction of the Gannet AS.4, the FAA successfully finalised its anti-submarine re-equipment initiative.

The squadron was reformed with Gannet AS.4 under the command of Lieutenant Commander A.Mc.K. Sinclair, RN, at RNAS Culdrose (HMS Seahawk), Cornwall, in May 1959 to embark in HMS Centaur. It embarked from RAF North Front at Gibraltar, approximately six weeks later, following a rapid conversion to fixed-wing flying for many of its pilots and observers. No Telegraphists Air were included in the draft because of the short notice. To accommodate the squadron, HMS Centaur landed 849 Squadron's airborne early warning flight in preparation for a planned Commonwealth exercise off Ceylon centred on carrier-based anti-submarine operations.

The squadron remained with HMS Centaur throughout the remainder of that Commission, visiting the Persian Gulf, before sailing for the Far East including Australia. The squadron returned home in April 1960 and re-embarked in June for exercises and a visit to Stockholm before disbanding on board on arrival home on 12 July. It was the last operational anti-submarine Gannet squadron embarked in the Royal Navy. XG797 is preserved at the Imperial War Museum at RAF Duxford.

=== Sea King (1983-2001) ===
With its rise as the primary anti-submarine warfare aircraft of the Fleet Air Arm, the Westland Sea King helicopter underwent further development with the introduction of the HAS.5, which commenced service with the Royal Navy on 2 October 1980. The HAS.5 could be recognised externally by its larger radome positioned above the fuselage. It featured a Decca 71 radar, Sea Searcher radar, an enhanced tactical air navigation system, and LAPADS (lightweight acoustic processing and display system) that operated in conjunction with signals from Jezebel passive sonobuoys.

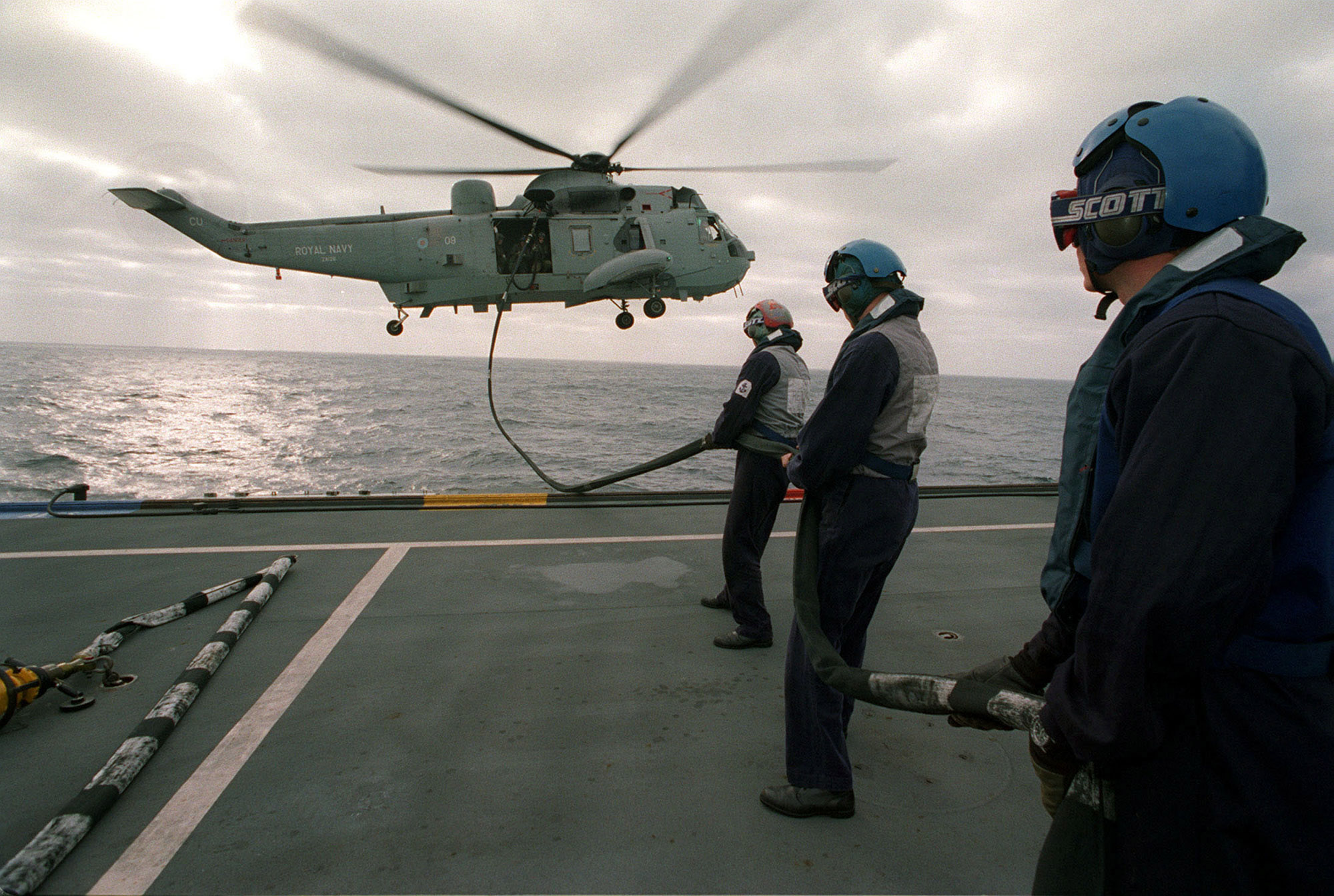
A Sea King is refuelled in flight from the deck of RFA Argus by personnel from 810 Squadron

810 squadron was reformed at RNAS Culdrose (HMS Seahawk), Cornwall, on 15 February 1983, equipped with ten Sea King HAS.5 helicopters, and was officially commissioned on 3 March. Established as a successor to 737 Naval Air Squadron, this squadron assumed the responsibility of delivering Advanced Flying Training (AFT) and Operational Flying Training (OFT) for anti-submarine warfare (ASW) Observers and aircrewmen, as well as OFT for ASW pilots. In the course of this training, detachments were conducted aboard the Aviation Training Ship (RFA Engadine until 1989, subsequently RFA Argus), for durations of up to seven months each year. The AFT responsibilities were returned to 706 Naval Air Squadron in October 1985.

The Sea King HAS.6 Operational Evaluation Unit (OEU) was reassigned to 810 Squadron in July 1993 when it absorbed ’E’ Flight of 826 Naval Air Squadron following its disbandment. The Sea King HAS.6 provided enhancements to the fundamental airframe and the primary transmission system, in addition to more advanced ASW sonar, MAD systems, and the capability to deploy Sea Eagle anti-ship missiles. In late 1994, the squadron assumed responsibility for the Sea King Flights aboard the Royal Navy's Type 22 Frigates, which had previously been managed by 819 Squadron.

Furthermore, beginning in March 1998, it undertook all training responsibilities previously held by the disbanded 706 Squadron. In 1998, 810 Squadron Sea Flight received the Boyd Trophy for their successful rescue of survivors from the Spanish container ship MV Delfin del Mediterraneo, which had capsized during a storm near Portugal. The squadron was formally disbanded at RNAS Culdrose on 31 July 2001, with its outstanding duties, such as training and the oversight of Frigate Flights, handed over to 771 Squadron.

== Aircraft flown ==
The squadron operated a variety of different aircraft and versions:

- Blackburn Dart torpedo bomber (April 1933 - November 1934)
- Blackburn Ripon IIC torpedo bomber (September 1933 - November 1934)
- Blackburn Baffin Mk I torpedo bomber (July 1934 - April 1937)
- Blackburn Shark Mk II torpedo bomber (April - September 1937)
- Fairey Swordfish I torpedo bomber (September 1937 - March 1943)
- Fairey Swordfish II torpedo bomber (March 1942 - March 1943)
- Fairey Barracuda Mk II torpedo and dive bomber (April 1943 - November 1944, January - July 1945)
- Fairey Barracuda TR III torpedo and dive bomber (February - August 1945)
- Fairey Firefly FR.Mk 4 fighter-reconnaissance aircraft (October 1947 - June 1950)
- Fairey Firefly AS.Mk 5 anti-submarine aircraft (January 1949 - May 1951)
- Fairey Firefly FR.Mk 5 fighter-reconnaissance aircraft (June 1951 - October 1953)
- Hawker Sea Fury FB.11 fighter-bomber (March 1954 - March 1955)
- Hawker Sea Hawk FGA 4 fighter/ground attack aircraft (July 1955 - December 1956)
- Hawker Sea Hawk FGA 6 fighter/ground attack aircraft (November 1955 - December 1956)
- Fairey Gannet AS.4 anti-submarine warfare aircraft (April 1959 - July 1960)
- Westland Sea King HAS.5 anti-submarine warfare helicopter (March 1983 - February 1990)
- Westland Sea King HAS.6 anti-submarine warfare helicopter (October 1989 - July 2001)

== Battle honours ==
The following battle honours have been awarded to 810 Naval Air Squadron:

- Norway 1940
- Mediterranean 1940-41
- Spartivento 1940
- Atlantic 1941
- "Bismarck" 1941
- Diego Suarez 1942
- Salerno 1943
- East Indies 1944
- Korea 1951-53

== Assignments ==
810 Naval Air Squadron was assigned as needed to form part of a number of larger units:

- 21st Naval TBR Wing - (25 October 1943 - 30 June 1944)
- 17th Carrier Air Group - (October 1947 - October 1949, October 1949 - May 1951)

== Commanding officers ==
List of commanding officers of 810 Naval Air Squadron:

1933 - 1944

- Commander E.W. Anstice, RN, (Squadron Leader, RAF), from 3 April 1933
- Squadron Leader T.A. Warne-Bowne, DSC, RAF, from 10 October 1933
- Squadron Leader G.H. Boyce, AFC, RAF, from 7 February 1934 (Wing Commander, 1 January 1936)
- Flight Lieutenant H.M. Mellor, MVO, RAF, from 5 May 1936 (Squadron Leader, 1 December 1936)
- Captain N.R.M. Skene, RM, (Squadron Leader, RAF), from 9 December 1938
- Captain A.C. Newson, RM, 16 June 1940
- Lieutenant Commander M. Johnstone, DSC, RN, from 16 July 1940
- Lieutenant J.V. Hartley, RN, from 11 September 1941
- Lieutenant Commander R.N. Everett, RN, from 29 December 1941
- Lieutenant Commander W.E. Waters, RN, from 31 January 1943
- Lieutenant Commander(A) A.J.B. Forde, RN, from 18 March 1943
- Lieutenant Commander(A) A.G. McWilliam, RNVR, from 27 February 1944
- Lieutenant Commander(A) A.J.B. Forde, DSC, RN, from 1 July 1944
- disbanded - 3 November 1944

1944 - 1945

- Lieutenant Commander(A) P.C. Heath, RN, from 16 December 1944
- disbanded - 22 August 1945

1947 - 1949

- Lieutenant Commander L.R. Tivy, RN, from 1 October 1947
- Lieutenant Commander F. Stovin-Bradford, DSC, RN, from 25 March 1949
- disbanded - 16 October 1949

1949 - 1951

- Lieutenant Commander K.S. Pattisson, DSC, RN, from 17 October 1949
- Lieutenant Commander G.R. Coy, RN, from 4 January 1951
- disbanded - 29 May 1951

1951 - 1953

- Lieutenant Commander D.E. Johnson, RN, from 29 June 1951
- Lieutenant Commander A.W. Bloomer, RN, from 28 June 1952
- disbanded - 17 December 1953

1954 - 1955

- Lieutenant Commander H.J. Abraham, RN, from 1 March 1954
- disbanded - 22 March 1955

1955 - 1956

- Lieutenant Commander P.M. Lamb, DFC, AFC, RN, from 4 July 1955
- disbanded - 18 December 1956

1959 - 1960

- Lieutenant Commander A.Mc.K. Sinclair, RN, from 20 April 1959
- disbanded - 12 July 1960

1983 - 2001

- Lieutenant Commander M.S. Tennant, RN, from 15 February 1983
- Lieutenant Commander D.P. Baudains, RN, from 20 January 1984
- Lieutenant Commander M.S. Burnett, RN, from 10 December 1985
- Lieutenant Commander D.R. Larmour, RN, from 7 December 1987
- Lieutenant Commander A.G.H. Underwood, RN, from 24 July 1989
- Lieutenant Commander T.R. Forrester, RN, from 10 December 1991
- Lieutenant Commander R.E. Snook, RN, from 30 July 1993
- Lieutenant Commander C.J. Hamp, RN, from 9 June 1995 (Commander 31 December 1996)
- Lieutenant Commander K.A. Taylor, RN, from 5 February 1997 (Commander 30 December 1997)
- Lieutenant Commander S.J. Murray, RN, from 13 February 1998
- Lieutenant Commander S.M. Steeds, RN, from 3 March 1998 (Commander 30 June 1998)
- Lieutenant Commander D.V. Stanton, RN, from 26 August 1998
- disbanded - 31 July 2001

Note: Abbreviation (A) signifies Air Branch of the RN or RNVR.

== See also ==
- Peter Compston - a Royal Navy Vice-Admiral who became Deputy Supreme Allied Commander Atlantic and former 810 Squadron pilot
- Attack on Mers-el-Kébir - 1940 British naval attack on the French Navy
