= List of Hawker Sea Fury operators =

The List of Hawker Sea Fury operators lists the counties and their air force units that have operated the aircraft:

== Operators ==
=== Australia ===
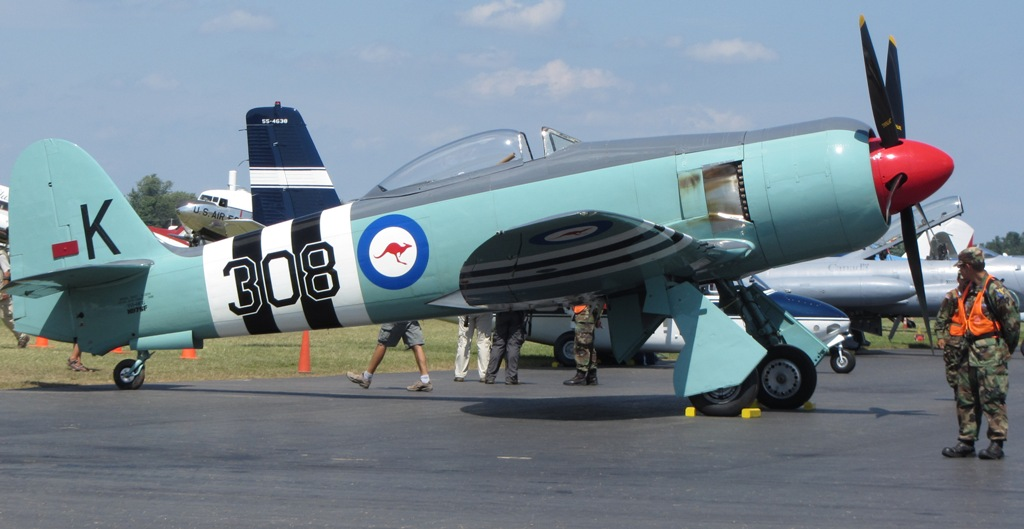
Sea Fury s/n 308, ex-Iraqi Air Force; repainted in the paint scheme of aircraft operated by the Australian Fleet Air Arm (1949–60).

Royal Australian Navy received about 50 ex-FAA Sea Furies during 1949 and 1950.

Royal Australian Navy - Fleet Air Arm

- 723 Squadron RAN - FB.11 (1952–56)
- 724 Squadron RAN - FB.11 (1961–62)
- 725 Squadron RAN - FB.11 (1958–59)
- 805 Squadron RAN - F.10 & FB.11 (1948–58)
- 808 Squadron RAN - FB.11 (1950–54)
- 850 Squadron RAN - FB.11 (1953–54)

=== Burma ===
Burma received 18 ex-FAA Sea Fury FB.11s and three Sea Fury T.20s in 1958.

Burma Air Force

=== Canada ===
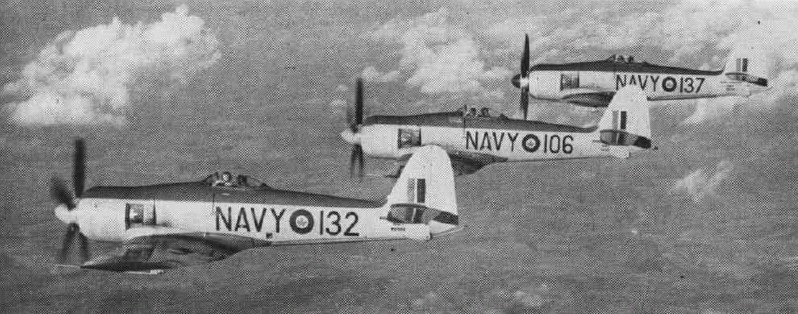
Sea Furies of the Royal Canadian Navy

A total of 74 Sea Furies served in three different RCN units - two combat squadrons (803 and 883) and the RCN's fixed-wing training unit, VT 40. The last Canadian military flight of the RCN Hawker Sea Fury type was made by F/O Lynn Garrison at McCall Field, Calgary, Alberta 1 April 1958. The aircraft involved was WG565 ferried to Calgary for use as an instructional airframe at the Provincial Institute of Technology and Arts.

Royal Canadian Navy - Royal Canadian Navy Fleet Air Arm

- 803 Squadron RCN - F.10 & FB.11 (1947–51). In May 1951 redesignated 870 Squadron
- 883 Squadron RCN - FB.11 (1948–51). In May 1951 redesignated 871 Squadron
- 870 Squadron RCN - FB.11 (1951–52). In November 1952 redesignated VF-870
- 871 Squadron RCN - FB.11 (1951–52). In November 1952 redesignated VF-871
- VF-870 - FB.11 (1952–54)
- VF-871 - FB.11 (1952–56)
- VT-40
- VX-10

=== Cuba ===
Cuba operated 15 ex-FAA Sea Fury FB.11s and two Sea Fury T.20s ordered in 1958. Deliveries started the same year, and by 1959, all had been delivered. Most of them were destroyed in crashes or cannibalized, albeit the British never imposed an embargo, unlike the USA. By the time the Bay of Pigs invasion took place on 15 April 1961, five were airworthy but only three were confirmed to be in action during the hostilities. One was shot down by either the Liberation Air Force (LAF) or ship fire. Two aircraft are displayed in museums in Cuba today.

=== Egypt ===
Egypt ordered 12 Sea Furies in 1949, and they were delivered during the following two years.

Royal Egyptian Air Force

=== Germany ===
The Federal Republic of Germany bought eight ex-FAA Sea Fury T.20s during 1959–60. They were further modified in Germany for target-towing duties and served under contract to the Luftwaffe as target tugs.

Deutsche Luftfahrt Beratungsdienst

=== Iraq ===
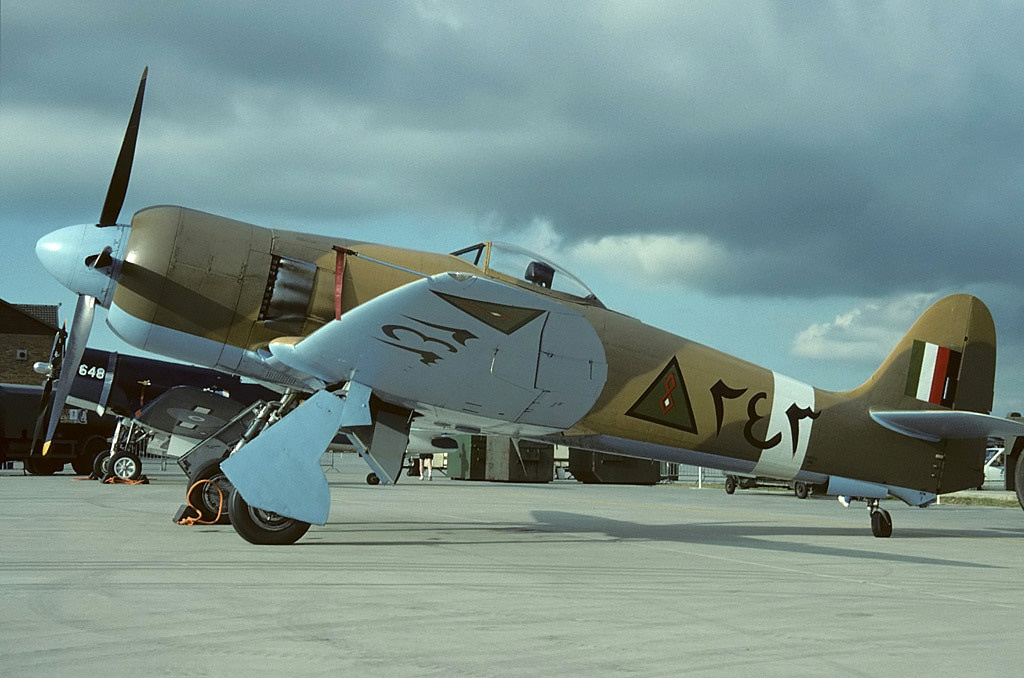
Hawker Fury in Iraqi Air Force markings

Iraq ordered 30 de-navalized Fury F.1 fighter-bombers and five (later reduced to two) Fury T.52 trainers in December 1946; the first batch of nine aircraft arrived in Iraq in November 1947. 20 additional Fury F.1s were bought in 1951.

Iraqi Air Force

- No. 1 Squadron Royal Iraqi Air Force
- No. 4 Squadron Royal Iraqi Air Force
- No. 7 Squadron Royal Iraqi Air Force

=== Morocco ===
Four Hawker Furies were donated by Iraq in 1961. However, the aircraft were found to be in a very poor condition, and they were never flown in Morocco (apart from a single test flight).

Royal Moroccan Air Force

=== Netherlands ===
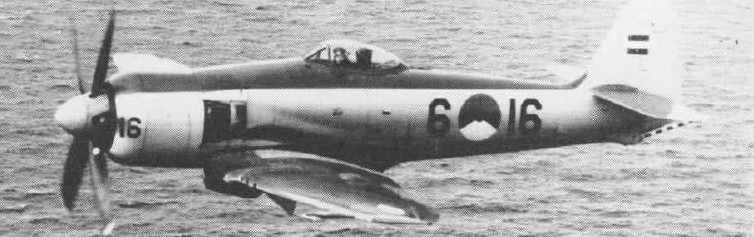
A Sea Fury of the Royal Netherlands Navy

The Royal Netherlands Navy purchased 10 Sea Fury F. Mk.50 for service on the escort carrier Karel Doorman (QH1). Additional 12 Sea Fury FB. Mk.60 were purchased, and as a third order 25 Sea Fury FB. Mk.51 were built under license by Fokker. Several aircraft served aboard the second Karel Doorman (R81). Dutch Sea Furies were finally replaced in 1957 by Hawker Sea Hawks.

Royal Netherlands Navy - Dutch Naval Aviation Service

- 860 Naval Air Squadron - FB.50 (1950–56)

=== Pakistan ===
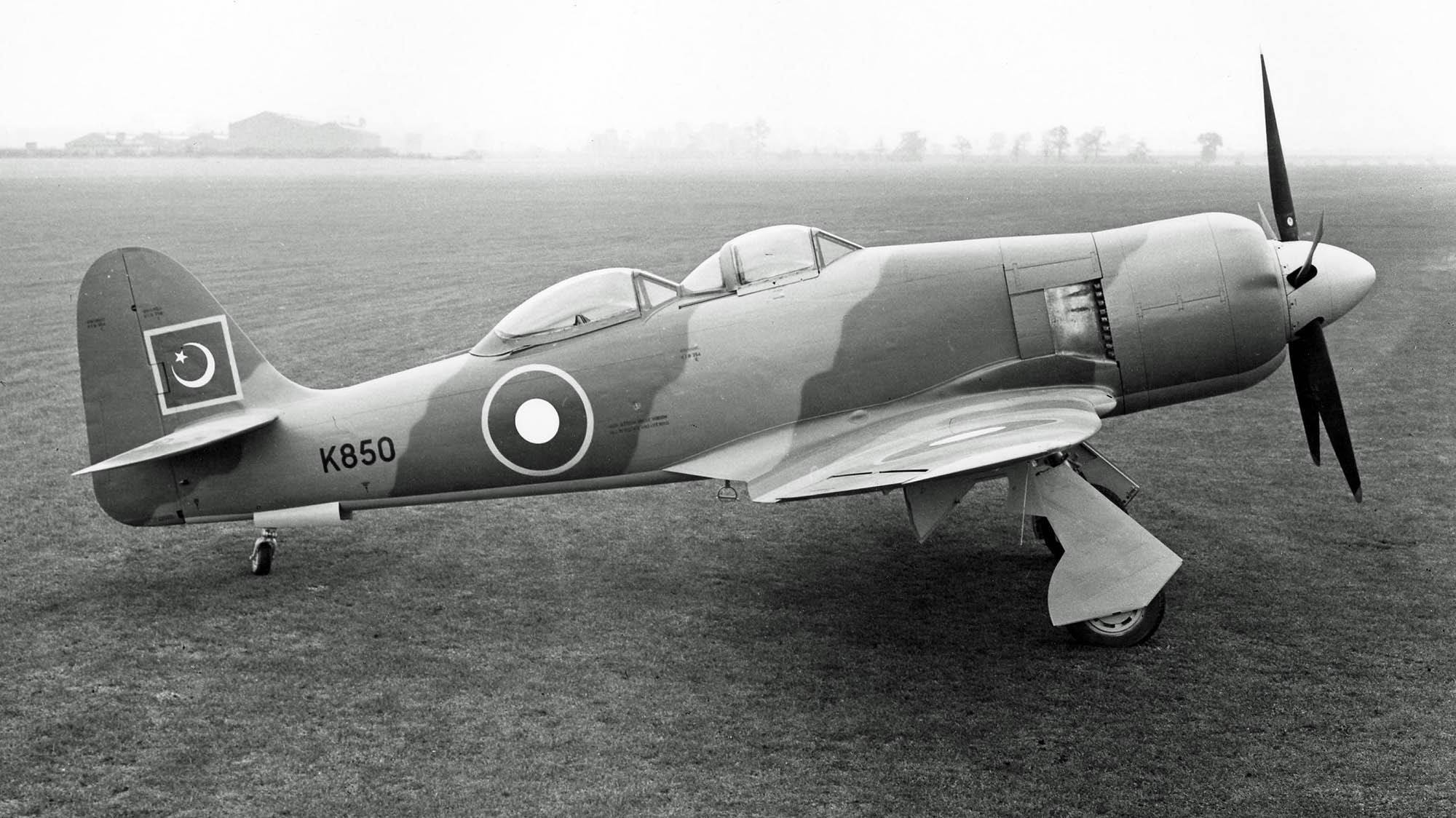
Pakistan Air Force Sea Fury T.61

Between 1949 and 1950 Pakistan purchased 87 brand new Sea Fury Mk.60s, five ex-FAA FB.11, the prototype F.2/43 Fury (NX802) and five newly built Sea Fury Mk.61 two seat trainers.

Pakistan Air Force

- No. 5 Squadron "Falcons"
- No. 9 Squadron "Griffins"
- No. 14 Squadron "Tail Choppers"
- No. 23 Squadron "Talons"

=== United Kingdom ===
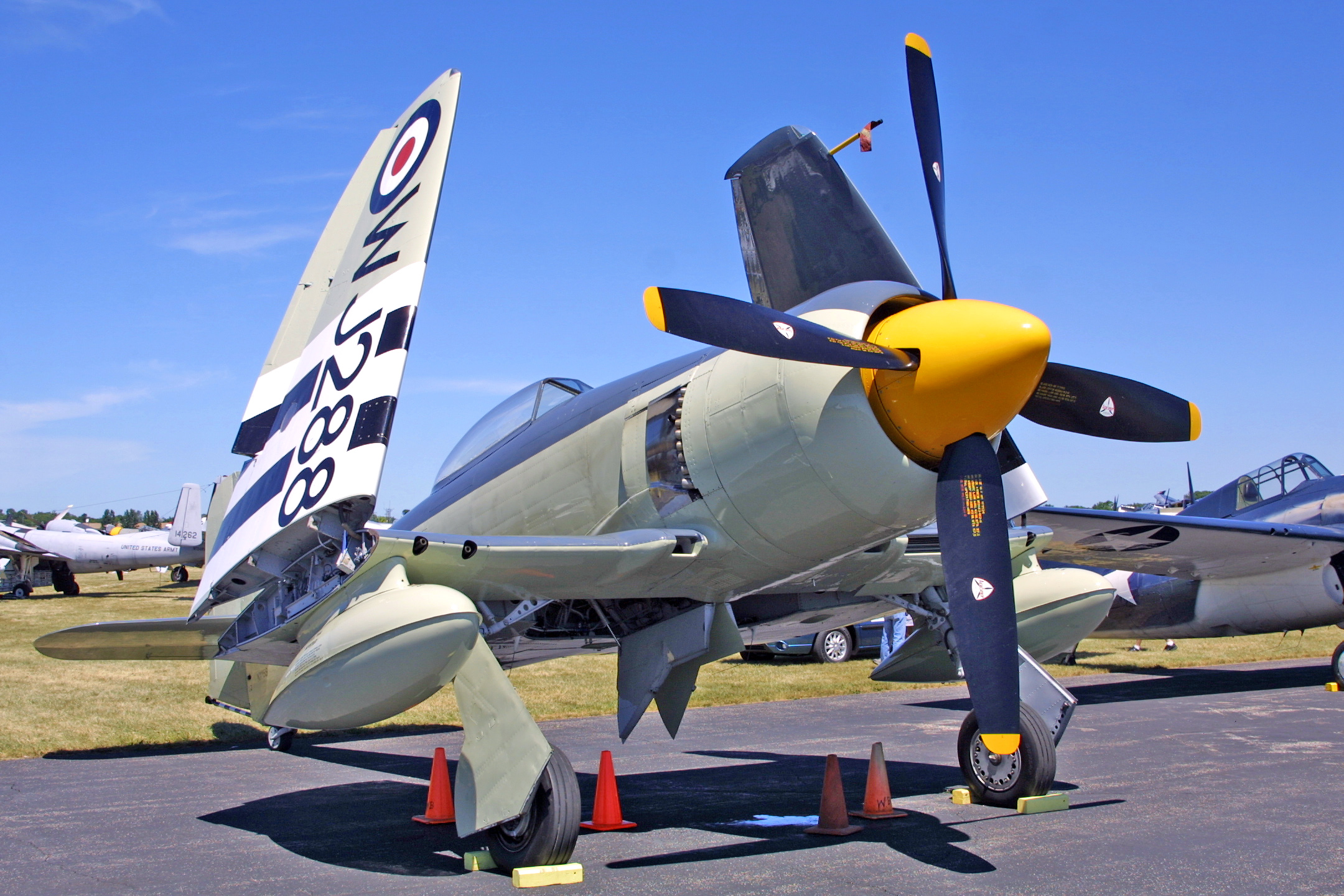
A Sea Fury in Royal Navy colours at Oshkosh, 2003

Royal Navy - Fleet Air Arm

- 700 Naval Air Squadron - F.10 & FB.11 (1948-49)
- 703 Naval Air Squadron - F.10, FB.11 & T.20 (1948-55)
- 736 Naval Air Squadron - F.10, FB.11 & T.20 (1949-52)
- 738 Naval Air Squadron - F.10, FB.11 & T.20 (1950-55)
- 739 Naval Air Squadron - FB.11 (1948)
- 744 Naval Air Squadron - FB.11 (1954-56)
- 751 Naval Air Squadron - FB.11 (1952-56)
- 759 Naval Air Squadron - FB.11 & T.20 (1952-54)
- 767 Naval Air Squadron - FB.11 (1949-52)
- 771 Naval Air Squadron - T.20 (1950)
- 773 Naval Air Squadron - FB.11 (1949)
- 778 Naval Air Squadron - F.10 & FB.11 (1947 & 1948-49)
- 781 Naval Air Squadron - F.10, FB.11 & T.20 (1948-55)
- 782 Naval Air Squadron - FB.11 & T.20 (1948-50 & 1951)
- 787 Naval Air Squadron - F.10, FB.11 & T.20 (1947-48 & 1949-54)
- 799 Naval Air Squadron - F.10, FB.11 & T.20 (1948-51)
- 801 Naval Air Squadron - FB.11 & T.20 (1951-55)
- 802 Naval Air Squadron - F.10, FB.11 & T.20 (1948-54)
- 804 Naval Air Squadron - FB.11 (1949-54)
- 806 Naval Air Squadron - FB.11 (1948)
- 807 Naval Air Squadron - F.10 & FB.11 (1947-54)
- 809 Naval Air Squadron - T.20 (1951-52)
- 811 Naval Air Squadron - FB.11 (1953-54)
- 898 Naval Air Squadron - FB.11 (1951-53)
- Ferry Pool, Arbroath - FB.11 (1955)
- RN Section, Joint Warfare Establishment - F.10 & FB.11 (1945-52)
- Airwork Fleet Requirements Unit - FB.11 (1955-61)
- Royal Navy Historic Flight - T.20 (1976-90 & 1992 - ?)
- Northern Communications Squadron - T.20 (1955-56)

Royal Naval Volunteer Reserve

- 1830 Naval Air Squadron - T.20 (1952-54)
- 1831 Naval Air Squadron - FB.11 & T.20 (1950-55)
- 1832 Naval Air Squadron - FB.11 & T.20 (1950-56)
- 1833 Naval Air Squadron - FB.11 & T.20 (1950-55)
- 1834 Naval Air Squadron - FB.11 & T.20 (1953-55)
- 1835 Naval Air Squadron - FB.11 & T.20 (1950-56) (Pooled aircraft)
- 1836 Naval Air Squadron - FB.11 & T.20 (1950-56) (Pooled aircraft)
- 1843 Naval Air Squadron - T.20 (1952-54) (Pooled aircraft)

== See also ==
- Hawker Sea Fury
