= List of Fleet Air Arm aircraft squadrons =

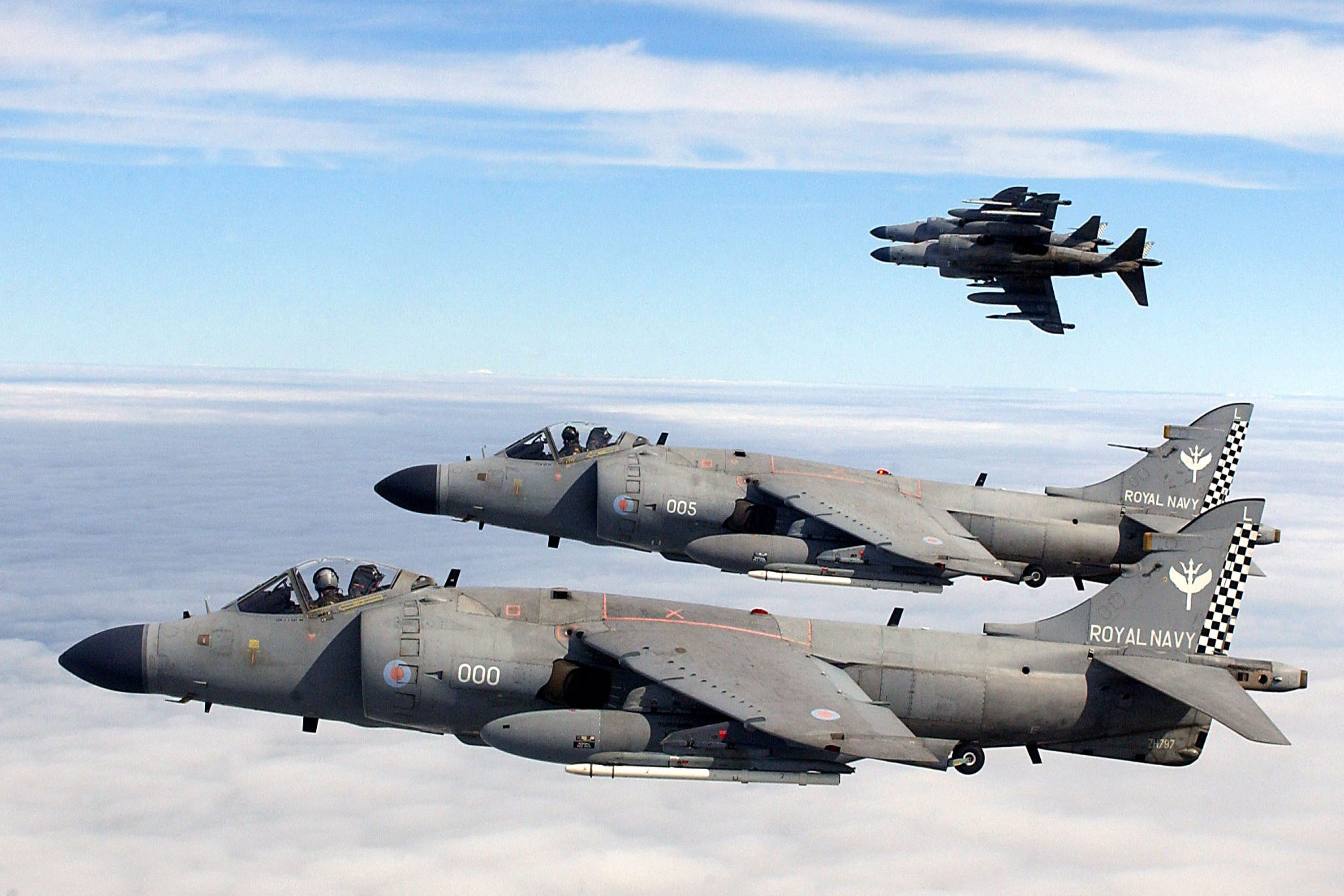
Four Sea Harrier FA2s of 801 Naval Air Squadron, based at RNAS Yeovilton, are shown flying in formation

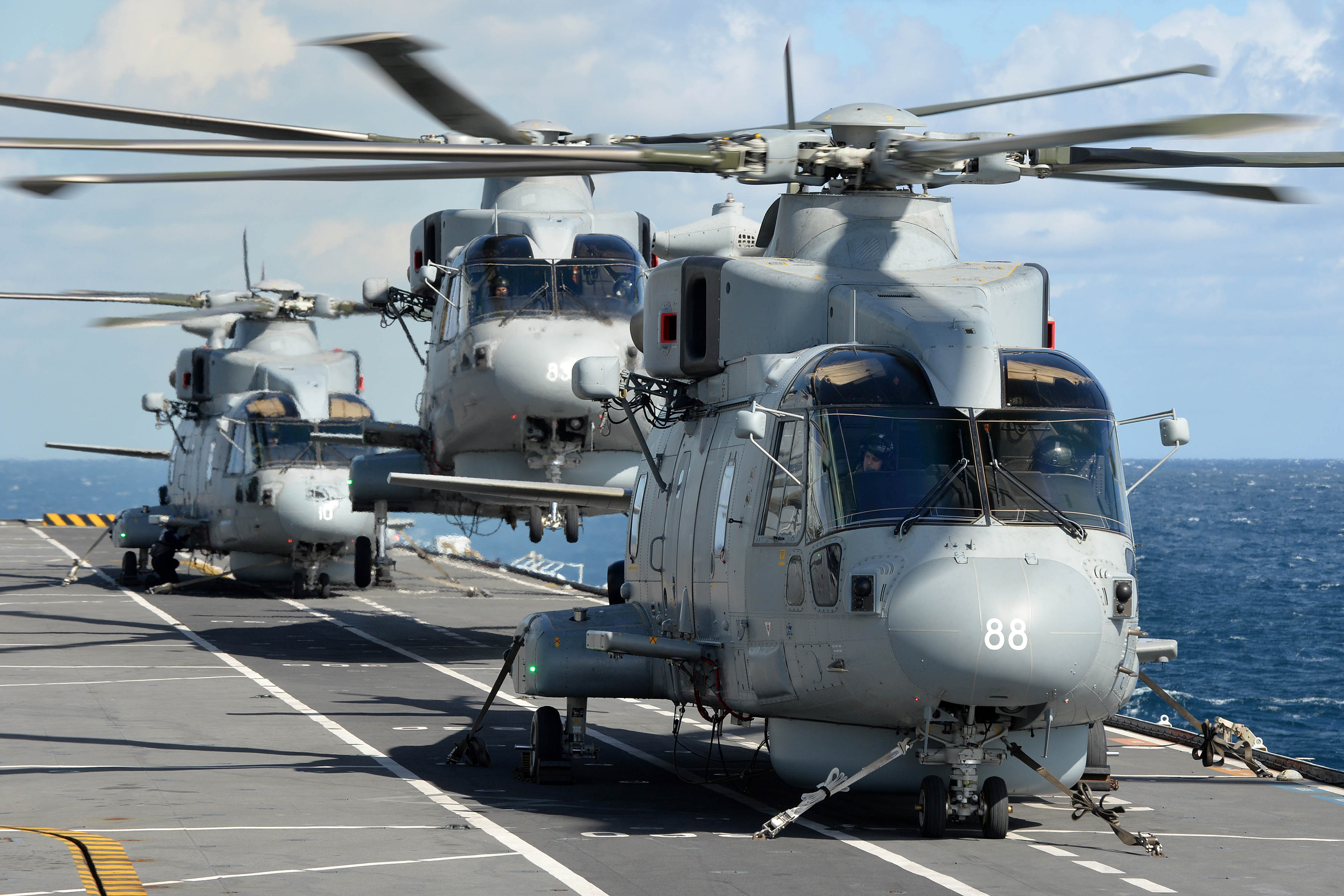
Merlin HM2 on Illustrious

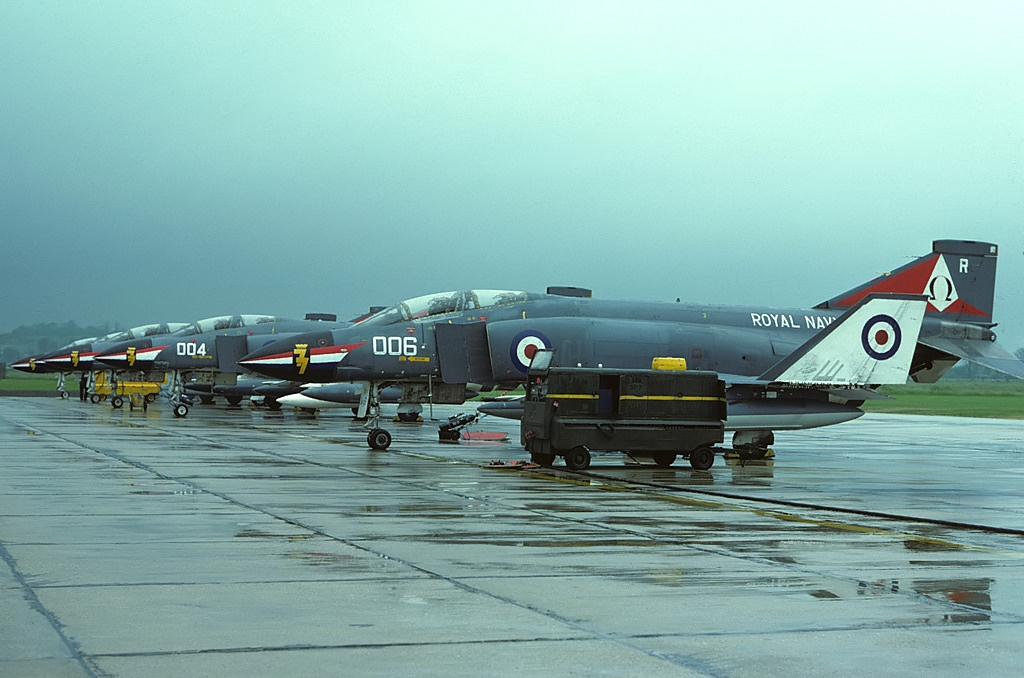
Phantom FG1 of 892 Naval Air Squadron

This is a List of Fleet Air Arm aircraft squadrons. The primary organisational structure for aerial operations within the Fleet Air Arm (FAA) is represented by squadrons. These include frontline combat squadrons which were designated with the numerical ranges of 800-899, 1700-1799, and 1800-1899. In contrast, the numerical range of 700-799 was allocated for training and support squadrons.

Established on 1 April 1924, the Fleet Air Arm included all Royal Air Force aircraft that were deployed from aircraft carriers and other naval vessels. On 24 May 1939, the administrative management of the Fleet Air Arm, which serves as the naval aviation branch of the Royal Navy, was transferred from the Royal Air Force to the Admiralty as a result of the "Inskip Award". At the beginning of the Second World War, the Fleet Air Arm comprised merely twenty squadrons.

Squadrons presented in bold typeface are presently operational within the Royal Navy's naval aviation component, the Fleet Air Arm. Squadrons in underline subsequently commissioned into the Royal Australian Navy Fleet Air Arm. Squadrons in italics subsequently commissioned into the Netherlands Naval Aviation Service. Squadrons subsequently transferred to or formed within the Royal Canadian Navy are denoted with the suffix RCN in their title.

== Royal Air Force ==
With the formation of the Fleet Air Arm in 1924, as a part of the Royal Air Force, blocks of squadron numbers were used. Numbers 401-439 were Fleet Fighter / Spotter Flights, assigned to Royal Navy battleships and cruisers. Numbers 440-459 were Fleet Reconnaissance Flights, many later becoming Fleet Spotter Reconnaissance Flights, and Number 460 onwards, as Fleet Torpedo Flights, later becoming Torpedo Bomber Flights.

The 700 and 800 series numbers were designated for squadrons within the Fleet Air Arm of the Royal Air Force, following the consolidation of the Fleet Air Arm flights into squadrons beginning in 1933. Upon the transfer of the Fleet Air Arm management to the Admiralty, this series of squadron numbers was subsequently adopted, resulting in no further allocation of numbers from this block to Royal Air Force squadrons.

== Royal Navy ==
The 700 and 800 series numbers were retained when the Admiralty regained full control of the Fleet Air Arm in 1939.

=== Numbering and role ===
Numbers 700-749 were for catapult flights and squadrons, but eventually these all merged into 700 Naval Air Squadron, leaving Numbers 701-710 for amphibian and floatplane squadrons from 1943 onwards. Numbers 750-799, were assigned for training and ancillary squadrons (in contrast to the RAF practice at the time of not assigning squadron numbers to training units).

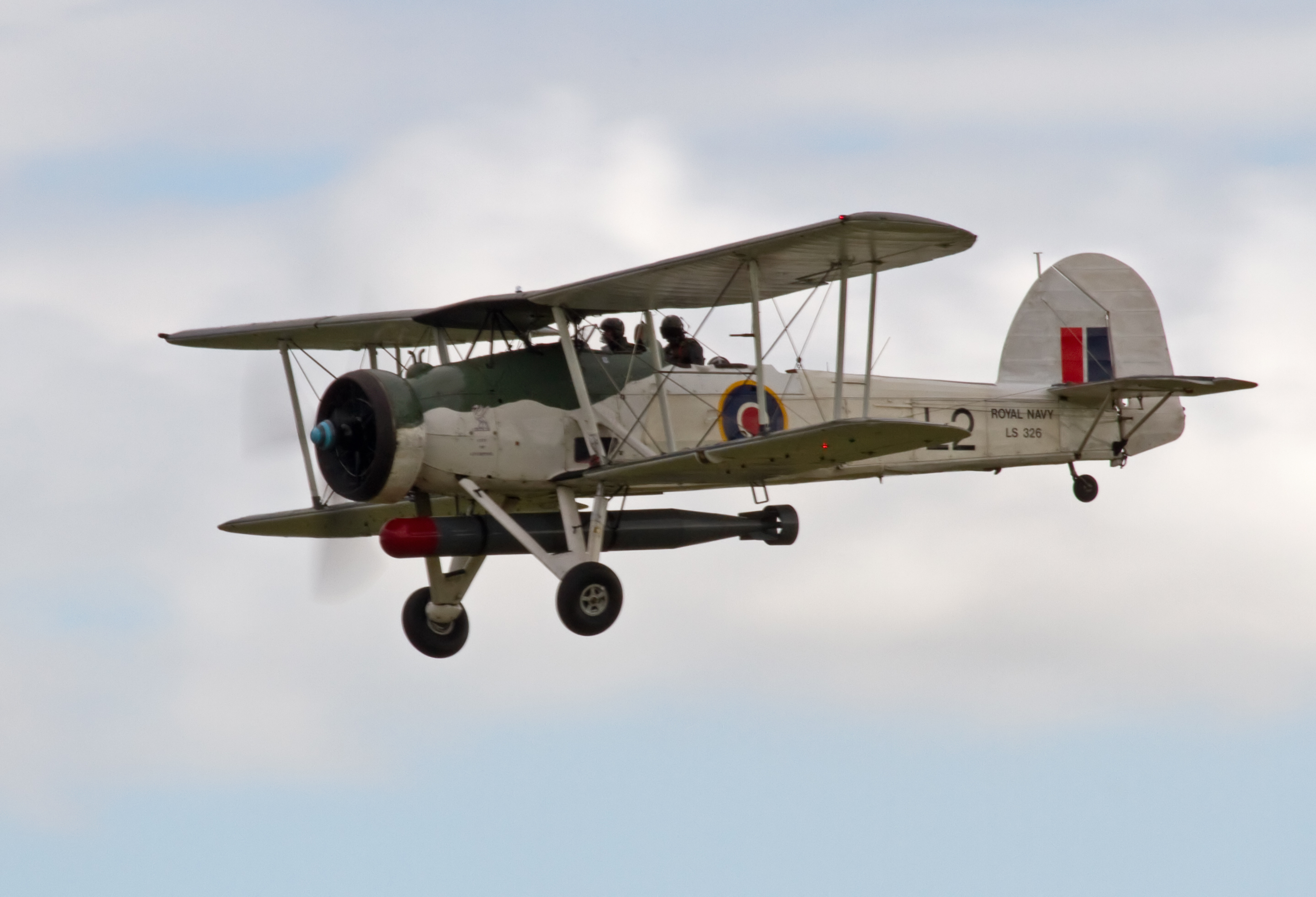
Swordfish in 836 Naval Air Squadron markings

Front line combat squadrons were Numbers 800-899 and broken down into categories: Numbers 800-809 were allocated for fighter squadrons, numbers 810-819 were for torpedo bomber squadrons, then later torpedo spotter reconnaissance (TSR) squadrons and torpedo bomber reconnaissance (TBR) squadrons, Numbers. 820-859 were initially spotter reconnaissance squadrons, then later becoming TSR squadrons and finally, TBR squadrons. Originally, TBR squadrons included numbers 860-869, but these were assigned to Dutch-crewed and then Royal Netherlands Navy squadrons. Numbers 870-899 were initially for single-seat fighter squadrons, but numbers 870-879 were later assigned to the Royal Canadian Navy squadrons. As these numbers ran out, new series prefixed by '1' were allocated. Leaving aside unused blocks, Numbers 1700-1749 became torpedo bomber reconnaissance squadrons and two-seat fighter squadrons were numbers 1770-1799. Dive bomber squadrons were numbers 1810-1829 and numbers 1830-1899 were for single-seat fighter squadrons.

== Front Line Squadrons (Nos. 800 to 899) ==
Squadrons presented in bold typeface are presently operational within the Royal Navy's Fleet Air Arm. Those indicated with an underline have been subsequently commissioned into the Royal Australian Navy Fleet Air Arm. Squadrons italicized have been later commissioned into the Netherlands Naval Aviation Service. Additionally, squadrons that have been transferred to or established within the Royal Canadian Navy are identified by the suffix RCN in their designation.

=== Nos. 800 to 809 ===
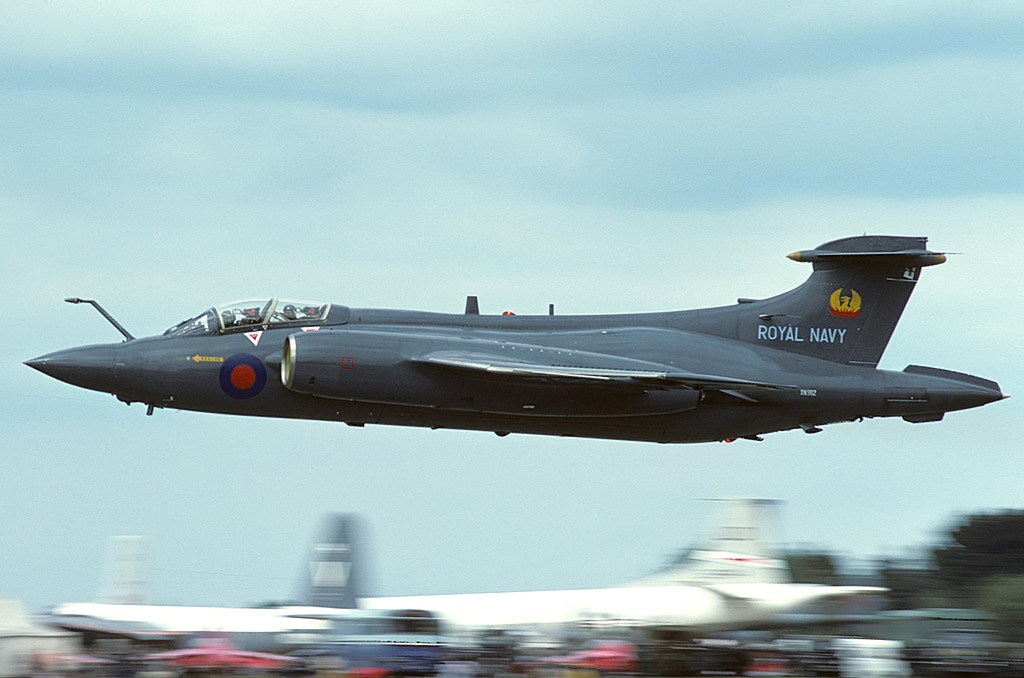
A Buccaneer S2 of 809 Naval Air Squadron

Single-seat fighter squadrons for aircraft carriers.

- 800 Naval Air Squadron
- 801 Naval Air Squadron
- 802 Naval Air Squadron
- 803 Naval Air Squadron briefly 803 Squadron RCN
- 804 Naval Air Squadron
- 805 Naval Air Squadron
  - 1940, 1940-43, 1945-48: 805 Naval Air Squadron
  - 1948-58, 1958-63, 1968-82, 2000-08: 805 Squadron RAN
- 806 Naval Air Squadron
- 807 Naval Air Squadron
- 808 Naval Air Squadron
  - 1940–41, 1942–45: 808 Naval Air Squadron
  - 1950–54, 1955–58, 2011–present: 808 Squadron RAN
- **809 Naval Air Squadron** - F-35B Lightning

=== Nos. 810 to 819 ===
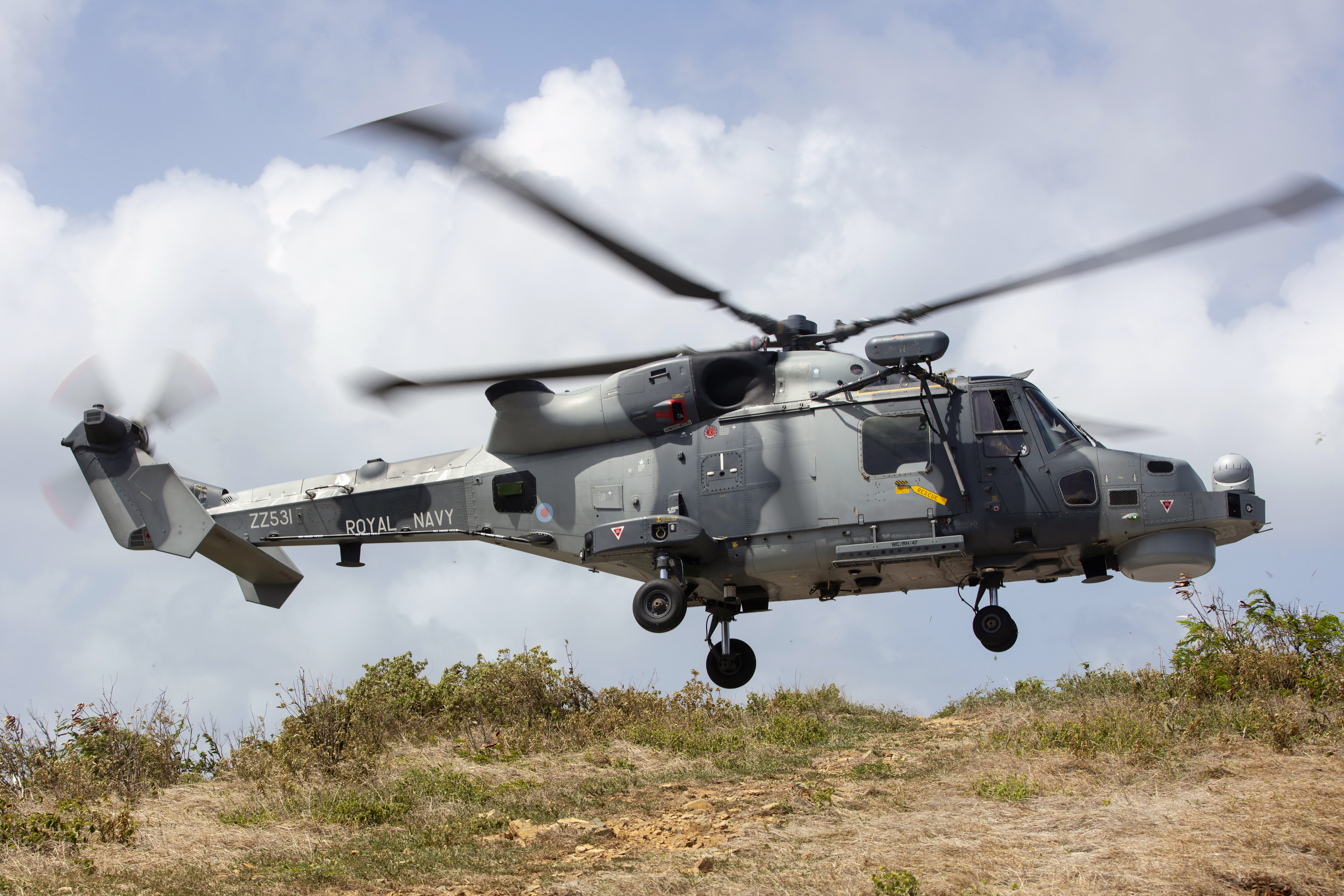
A Wildcat HM2 of 815 Naval Air Squadron

Torpedo Bomber squadrons for aircraft carriers, then later Torpedo Spotter Reconnaissance and Torpedo Bomber Reconnaissance squadrons.

- 810 Naval Air Squadron
- 811 Naval Air Squadron
- 812 Naval Air Squadron
- 813 Naval Air Squadron
- **814 Naval Air Squadron** – Merlin HM2 (small ship flights)
- **815 Naval Air Squadron** – Wildcat HMA2 (small ship flights)
- 816 Naval Air Squadron
  - 1939-41, 1942-44, 1945-48: 816 Naval Air Squadron
  - from 1948: 816 Squadron RAN
- 817 Naval Air Squadron
  - 1941-43, 1943-45, 1945: 817 Naval Air Squadron
  - 1950-2011: 817 Squadron RAN
- 818 Naval Air Squadron
- 819 Naval Air Squadron

=== Nos. 820 to 859 ===
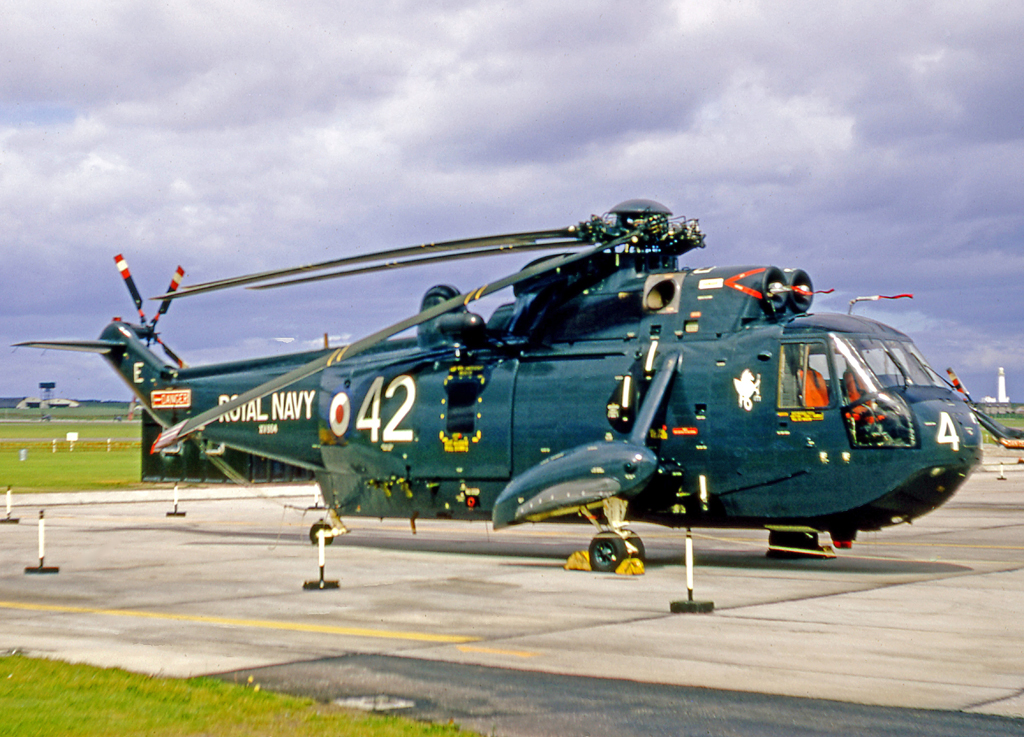
A Sea King HAS.1 of 826 Naval Air Squadron

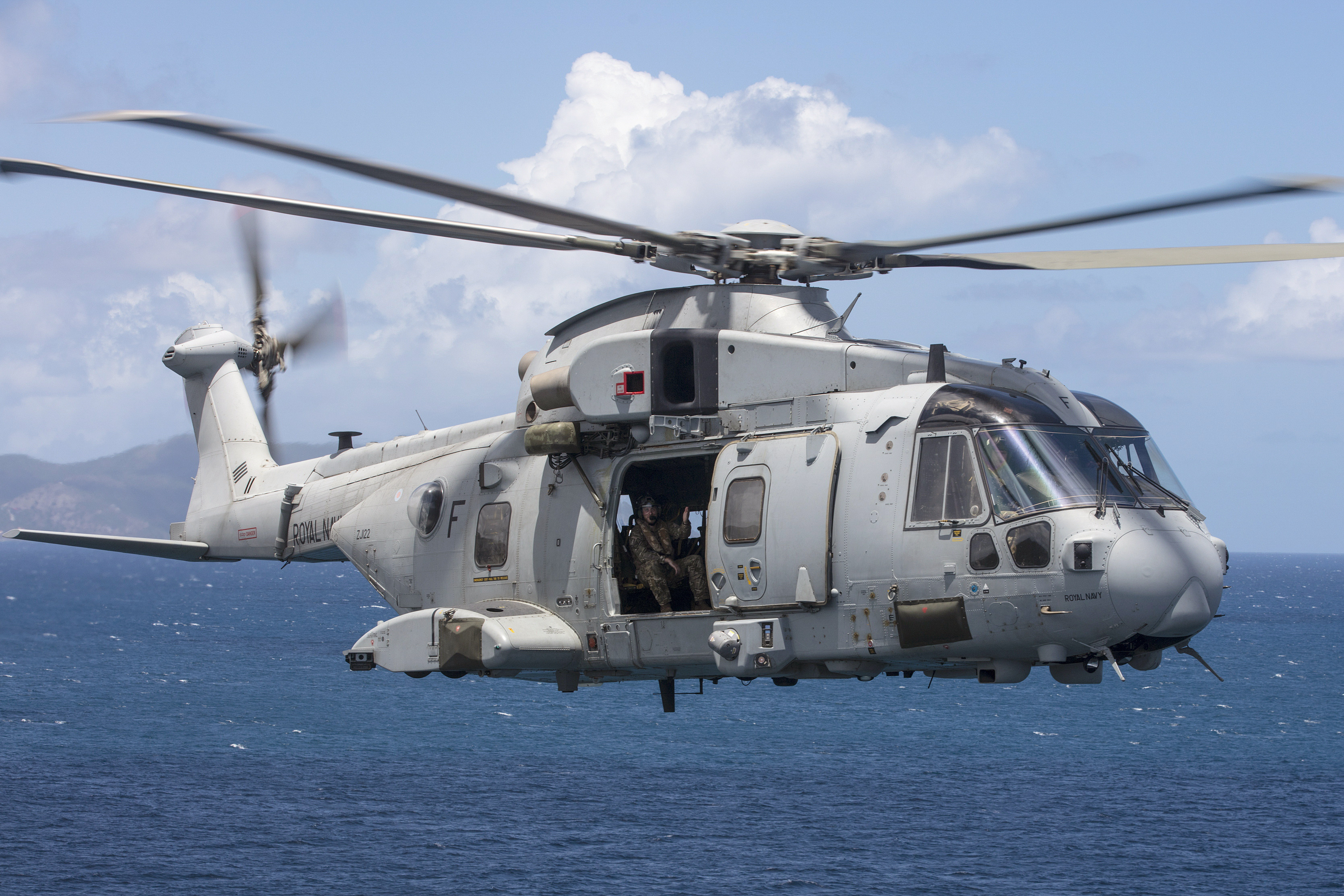
A Merlin HC4 of 845 Naval Air Squadron, Commando Helicopter Force

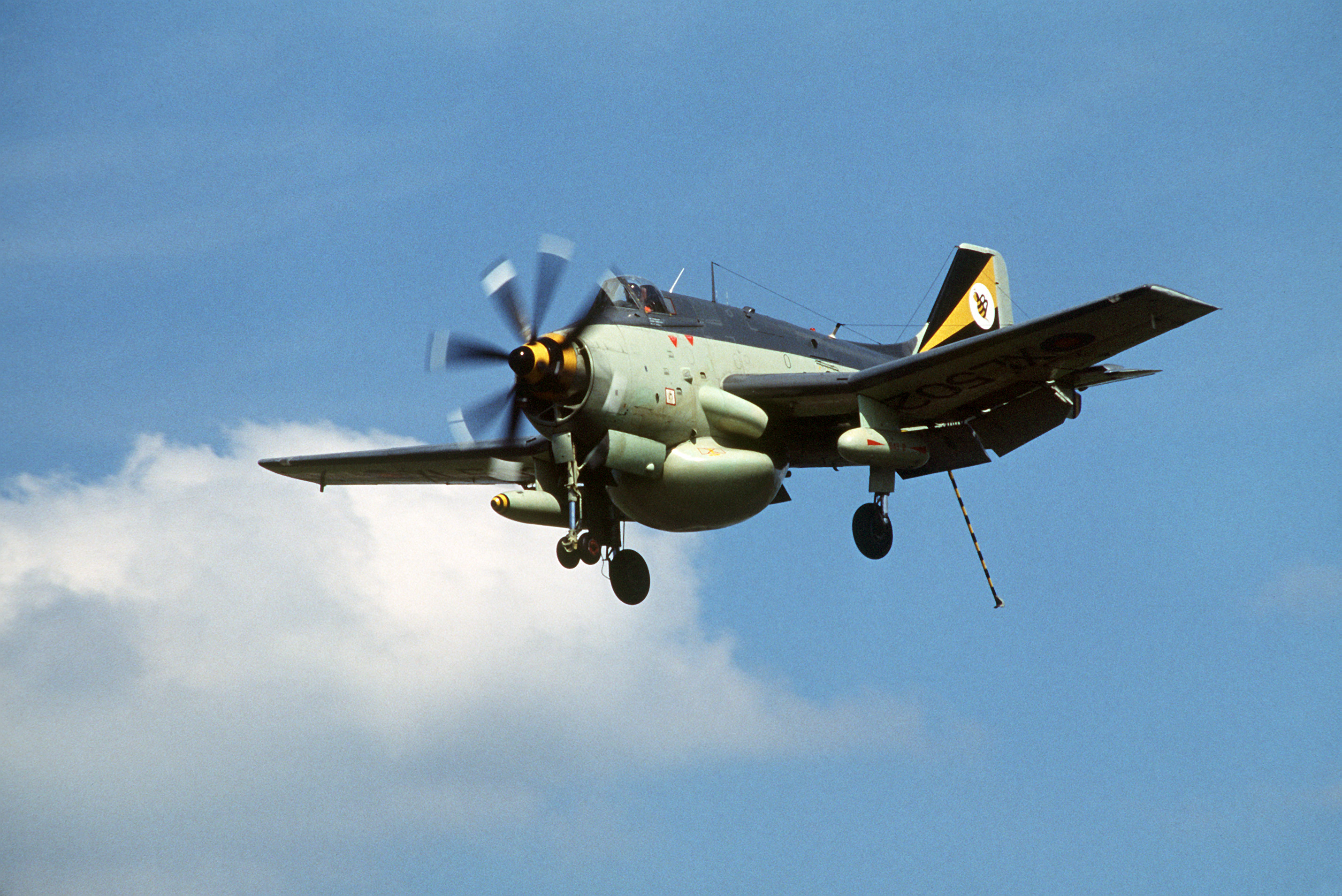
Gannet AEW3 of 849 Naval Air Squadron

Spotter Reconnaissance Squadrons, later Torpedo Spotter Reconnaissance and Torpedo Bomber Reconnaissance squadrons.

- **820 Naval Air Squadron** – Merlin HM2 (carrier air group)
- 821 Naval Air Squadron
- 822 Naval Air Squadron
- 823 Naval Air Squadron
- **824 Naval Air Squadron** – Merlin HM2 (conversion training)
- **825 Naval Air Squadron** – Wildcat HMA2 (conversion training)
  - 1946-51: 825 Squadron RCN, became 880 Squadron RCN
- 826 Naval Air Squadron
  - 1947-51: 826 Squadron RCN, became 881 Squadron RCN
- 827 Naval Air Squadron
- 828 Naval Air Squadron
- 829 Naval Air Squadron
- 830 Naval Air Squadron
- 831 Naval Air Squadron
- 832 Naval Air Squadron
- 833 Naval Air Squadron
- 834 Naval Air Squadron
- 835 Naval Air Squadron
- 836 Naval Air Squadron
- 837 Naval Air Squadron
- 838 Naval Air Squadron
- 840 Naval Air Squadron
- 841 Naval Air Squadron
- 842 Naval Air Squadron
- **845 Naval Air Squadron** – Merlin HC4/HC4A (Commando Helicopter Force)
- **846 Naval Air Squadron** – Merlin HC4 (Commando Helicopter Force and OCF)
- **847 Naval Air Squadron** – Wildcat AH1 (Commando Helicopter Force)
- 848 Naval Air Squadron
- 849 Naval Air Squadron
- 850 Naval Air Squadron
  - 1943, 1943-1944: 850 Naval Air Squadron
  - 1953-1954: 850 Squadron RAN
- 851 Naval Air Squadron
  - 1943-1945: 851 Naval Air Squadron
  - 1954-1984: 851 Squadron RAN
- 852 Naval Air Squadron
- 853 Naval Air Squadron
- 854 Naval Air Squadron
- 855 Naval Air Squadron
- 856 Naval Air Squadron
- 857 Naval Air Squadron

Note: 839, 843, 844, 858 and 859 Naval Air Squadrons did not form.

=== Nos. 860 to 869 ===
Torpedo Bomber Reconnaissance squadrons; Later reserved for Dutch-crewed and then Royal Netherlands Navy squadrons.

- 860 Naval Air Squadron
- 861 Naval Air Squadron

Note: 862-869 Naval Air Squadrons did not form.

=== Nos. 870 to 879 ===
Single-seat fighter squadrons. Nos. 870-879 were reserved for use by the Royal Canadian Navy (RCN) in 1951.

- 870 Naval Air Squadron
  - 1946-51: 803 Squadron RCN
  - from 1951: 870 Squadron RCN later VF 870
- 871 Naval Air Squadron
  - 1947-51: 883 Squadron RCN
  - from 1951: 871 Squadron RCN later VF 871
- 877 Naval Air Squadron
- 878 Naval Air Squadron
- 879 Naval Air Squadron

Note: Nos. 872-876 Naval Air Squadrons did not form.

=== Nos. 880 to 899 ===
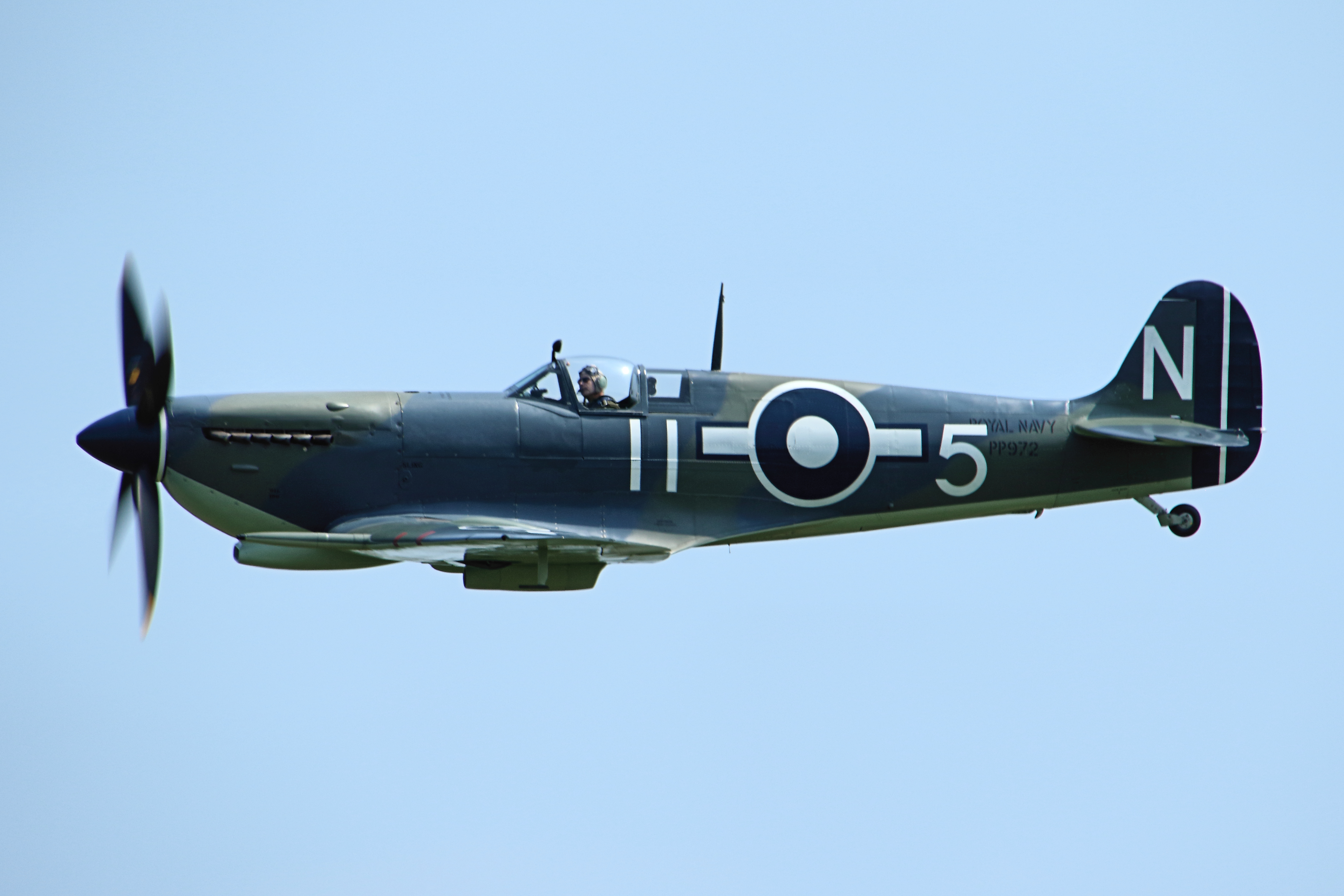
A Seafire in 880 Naval Air Squadron markings

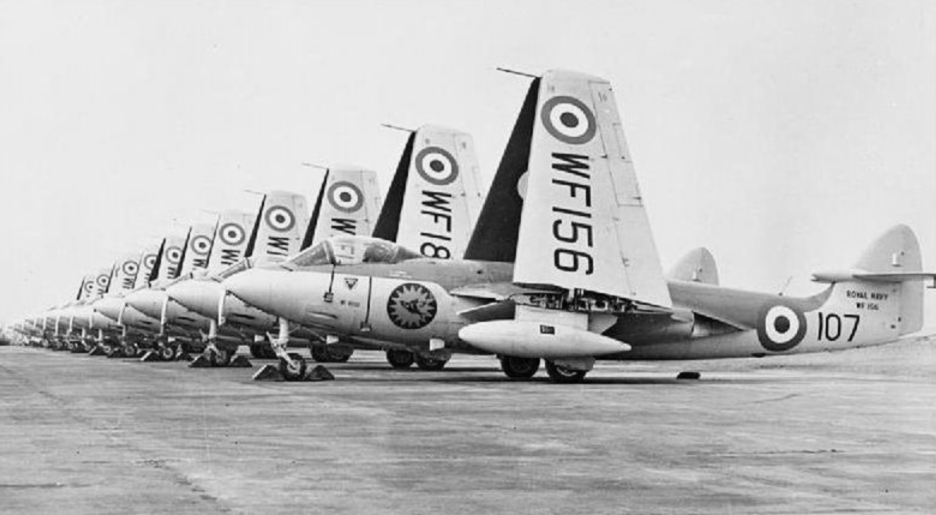
Sea Hawks of 898 Naval Air Squadron

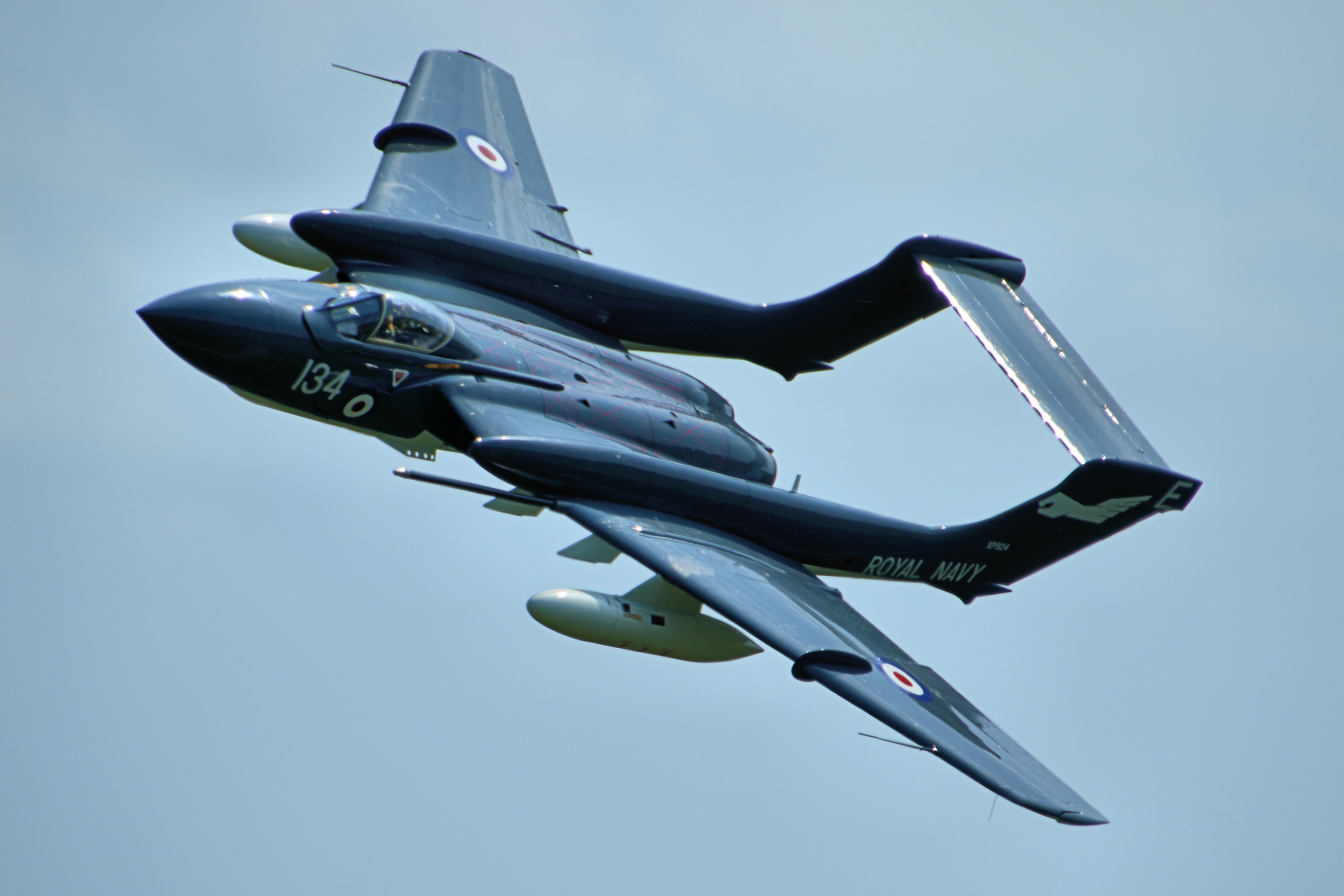
A Sea Vixen of 899 Naval Air Squadron

Single-seat fighter squadrons for aircraft carriers. Nos. 880, 881 and 883 were subsequently used by the Royal Canadian Navy (RCN).

- 880 Naval Air Squadron
  - 1941-45: 880 Naval Air Squadron
  - 1951-90: 880 Squadron RCN later VS 880 then MR 880
- 881 Naval Air Squadron
  - 1941-45: 881 Naval Air Squadron
  - 1951-59: 881 Squadron RCN later VS 881
- 882 Naval Air Squadron
- 883 Naval Air Squadron
  - 1941-42, 1945-46: 883 Naval Air Squadron
  - 1947-51: 883 Squadron RCN became 871 Squadron RCN
- 884 Naval Air Squadron
- 885 Naval Air Squadron
- 886 Naval Air Squadron
- 887 Naval Air Squadron
- 888 Naval Air Squadron
- 889 Naval Air Squadron
- 890 Naval Air Squadron
- 891 Naval Air Squadron
- 892 Naval Air Squadron
- 893 Naval Air Squadron
- 894 Naval Air Squadron
- 895 Naval Air Squadron
- 896 Naval Air Squadron
- 897 Naval Air Squadron
- 898 Naval Air Squadron
- 899 Naval Air Squadron

== Front Line Squadrons (Nos. 1700 to 1799) ==
Squadrons presented in bold typeface are presently operational within the Royal Navy's Fleet Air Arm.

=== Nos. 1700 to 1749 ===
Torpedo Bomber Reconnaissance squadrons, reallocated to Amphibian Bomber Reconnaissance squadrons.

- **1700 Naval Air Squadron** – Engineering, aviation and logistical support
- 1701 Naval Air Squadron
- 1702 Naval Air Squadron
- 1703 Naval Air Squadron
- **1710 Naval Air Squadron** – Scientific and engineering support

Note: Nos. 1704-1709 and 1711-1749 were never formed.

=== Nos. 1750 to 1769 ===
Single-seat fighter squadrons (not adopted).

=== Nos. 1770 to 1799 ===
Two-seat fighter squadrons.

- 1770 Naval Air Squadron
- 1771 Naval Air Squadron
- 1772 Naval Air Squadron
- 1790 Naval Air Squadron
- 1791 Naval Air Squadron
- 1792 Naval Air Squadron

Note: Nos. 1773-1789 and 1793-1799 were never formed. Nos. 1773 to 1775 Squadrons were planned to form in 1945 for the British Pacific Fleet, but this never transpired.

== Front Line Squadrons (Nos. 1800 to 1899) ==
=== Nos. 1800 to 1809 ===
Torpedo Bomber Reconnaissance units (not adopted).

=== Nos. 1810 to 1829 ===
Dive-bomber squadrons.

- 1820 Naval Air Squadron

Note: Nos. 1810-1819 and 1821-1829 were never formed.

=== Nos. 1830 to 1899 ===
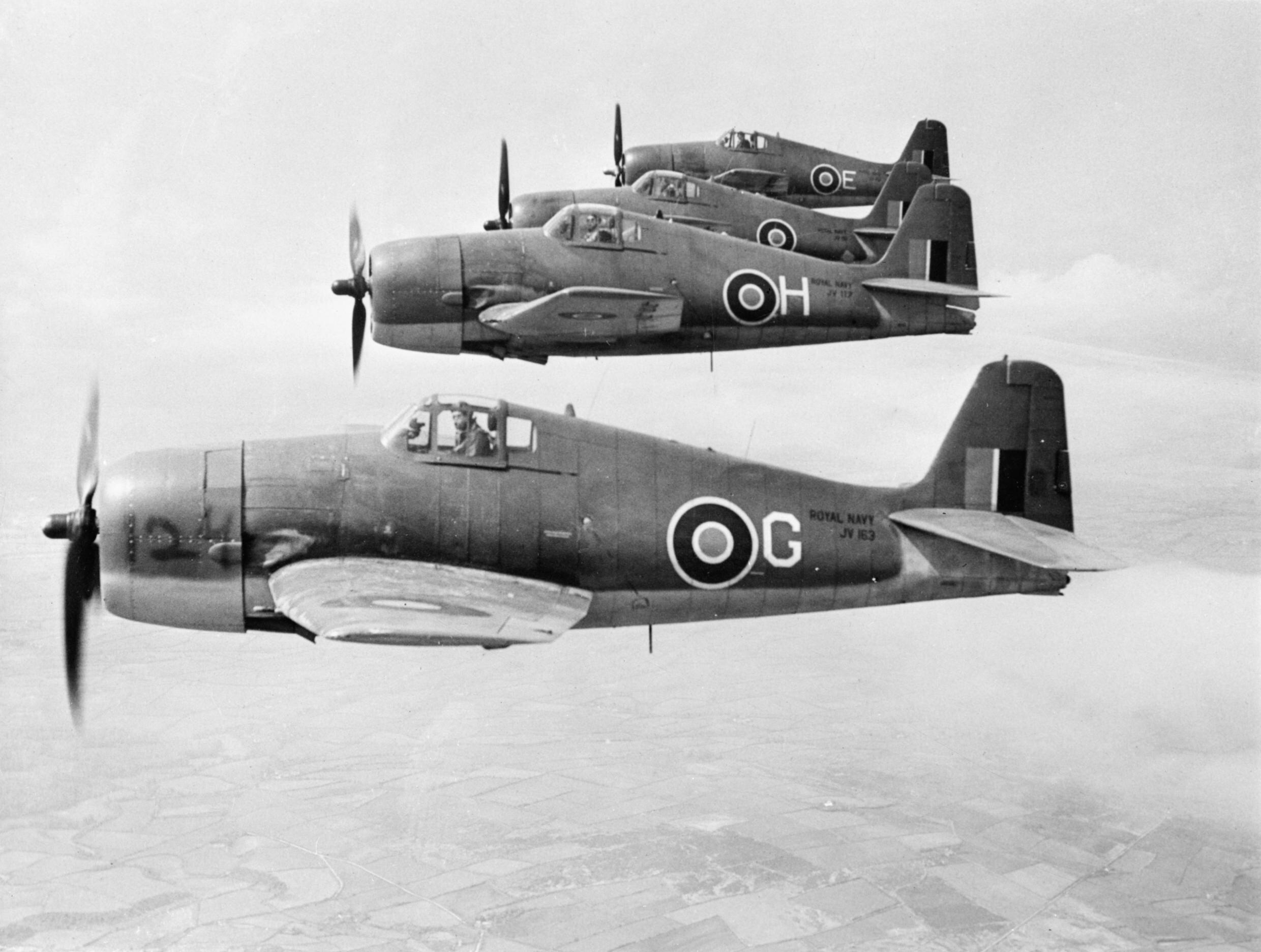
Hellcat F. Mk. Is of 1840 Naval Air Squadron

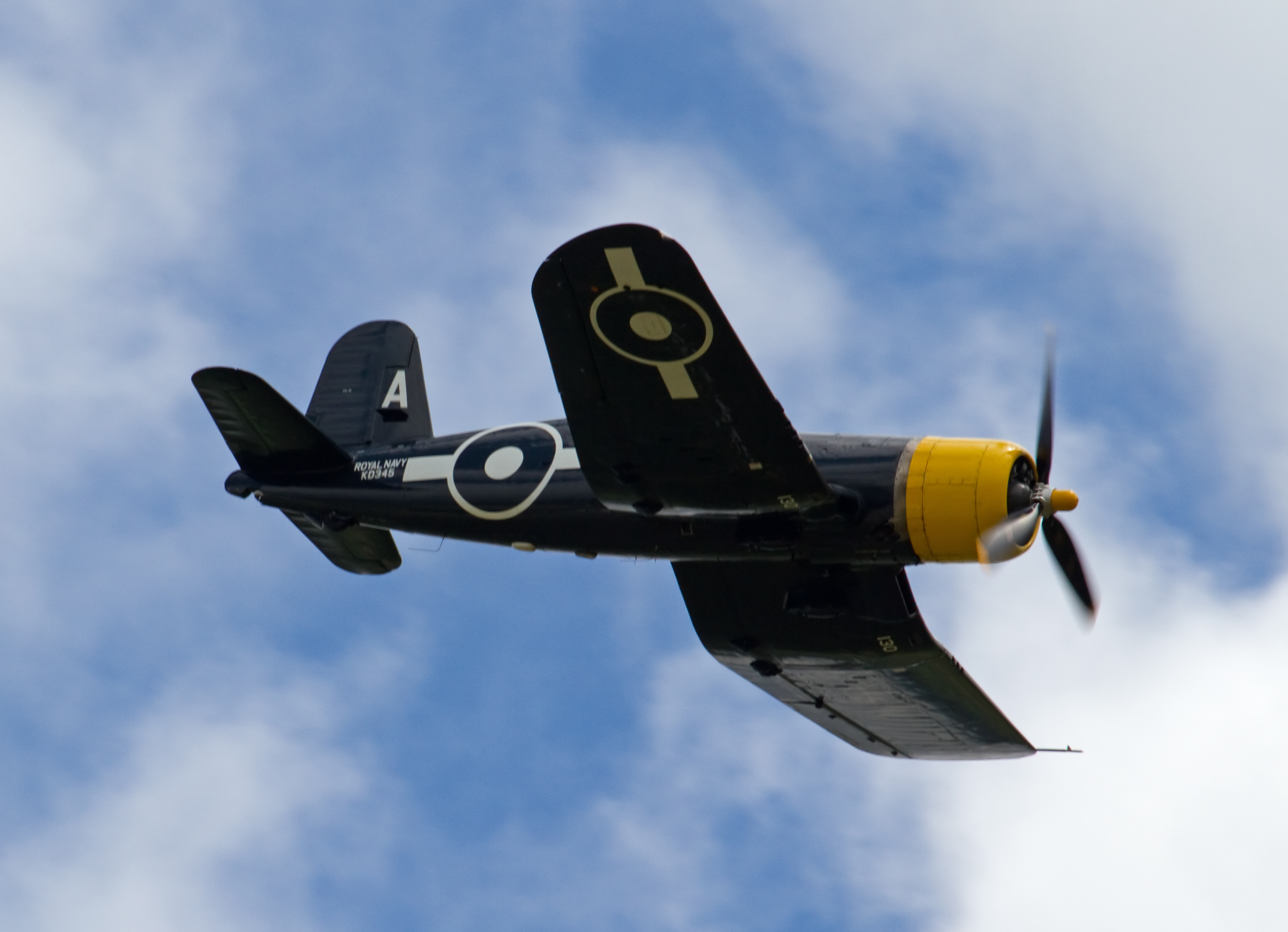
A Corsair Mk IV in 1850 Naval Air Squadron markings

Single-seat fighter squadrons.

- 1830 Naval Air Squadron
- 1831 Naval Air Squadron
- 1832 Naval Air Squadron
- 1833 Naval Air Squadron
- 1834 Naval Air Squadron
- 1835 Naval Air Squadron
- 1836 Naval Air Squadron
- 1837 Naval Air Squadron
- 1838 Naval Air Squadron
- 1839 Naval Air Squadron
- 1840 Naval Air Squadron
- 1841 Naval Air Squadron
- 1842 Naval Air Squadron
- 1843 Naval Air Squadron
- 1844 Naval Air Squadron
- 1845 Naval Air Squadron
- 1846 Naval Air Squadron
- 1847 Naval Air Squadron
- 1848 Naval Air Squadron
- 1849 Naval Air Squadron
- 1850 Naval Air Squadron
- 1851 Naval Air Squadron
- 1852 Naval Air Squadron
- 1853 Naval Air Squadron

Note: Nos. 1854-1899 were never formed. The Reserve Squadrons later used Nos. 1830-1836 and 1840-1844 for Royal Naval Volunteer Reserve Air Branch squadrons and Nos. 1831 and 1832 were Royal Naval Reserve Air Branch squadrons.

== Second Line Squadrons (Nos. 700 to 799) ==
Squadrons presented in bold typeface are presently operational within the Royal Navy's Fleet Air Arm. Squadrons in underline subsequently commissioned into Royal Australian Navy Fleet Air Arm. Squadrons that have been transferred to or established within the Royal Canadian Navy are identified by the suffix RCN in their designation.

=== Nos. 700 to 749 ===
Initially designated for Catapult flights, the area later evolved into catapult squadrons. Following the dissolution of these squadrons, the range was repurposed for training and support squadrons. Numbers 700 to 710 were designated for the utilisation of amphibian and floatplane squadrons in 1943; however, this designation was subsequently discontinued. When these ceased to exist the range became available for training and ancillary squadrons.

A Juno HT1; used by 705 Naval Air Squadron within No. 1 Flying Training School RAF

A Tutor T1 as used by 727 Naval Air Squadron

- **700X Naval Air Squadron** – RQ-20 Puma, Peregrine rotary-wing UAV and Malloy Aeronautics T150 (Maritime Unmanned Air Systems)
- 701 Naval Air Squadron
- 702 Naval Air Squadron
- 703 Naval Air Squadron
- 704 Naval Air Squadron
- **705 Naval Air Squadron** – Juno HT1 (part of No. 1 Flying Training School RAF)
- 706 Naval Air Squadron
- 707 Naval Air Squadron
- 708 Naval Air Squadron
- 709 Naval Air Squadron
- 710 Naval Air Squadron
- 711 Naval Air Squadron
- 712 Naval Air Squadron
- 713 Naval Air Squadron
- 714 Naval Air Squadron
- 715 Naval Air Squadron
- 716 Naval Air Squadron
- 717 Naval Air Squadron
- 718 Naval Air Squadron
- 719 Naval Air Squadron
- 720 Naval Air Squadron
- 721 Naval Air Squadron
- 722 Naval Air Squadron
- 723 Naval Air Squadron
  - 1945–1946: 723 Naval Air Squadron
  - 1952–present: 723 Squadron RAN
- 724 Naval Air Squadron
  - 1945–1946: 724 Naval Air Squadron
  - 1955–1984: 724 Squadron RAN
- 725 Naval Air Squadron
  - 1943-1945: 725 Naval Air Squadron
  - 1958–1961, 1962–1975, 2015–present 725 Squadron RAN
- 726 Naval Air Squadron
- **727 Naval Air Squadron** – Tutor T1
- 728 Naval Air Squadron
- 728B Naval Air Squadron
- 728C Naval Air Squadron
- 729 Naval Air Squadron
- 730 Naval Air Squadron
- 731 Naval Air Squadron
- 732 Naval Air Squadron
- 733 Naval Air Squadron
- 734 Naval Air Squadron
- 735 Naval Air Squadron
- 736 Naval Air Squadron
- 737 Naval Air Squadron
- 738 Naval Air Squadron
- 739 Naval Air Squadron
- 740 Naval Air Squadron
- 741 Naval Air Squadron
- 742 Naval Air Squadron
- 743 Naval Air Squadron
  - 1943-45: 743 Naval Air Squadron
  - 1946-54: 743 Squadron RCN then VU 32
- **744 Naval Air Squadron** – Joint Uncrewed Air System Test and Evaluation Squadron (JUAS TES)
- 745 Naval Air Squadron
- 746 Naval Air Squadron
- 747 Naval Air Squadron
- 748 Naval Air Squadron
- 749 Naval Air Squadron

=== Nos. 750 to 799 ===
Numbers 750 to 799 were allocated for training and support squadrons.

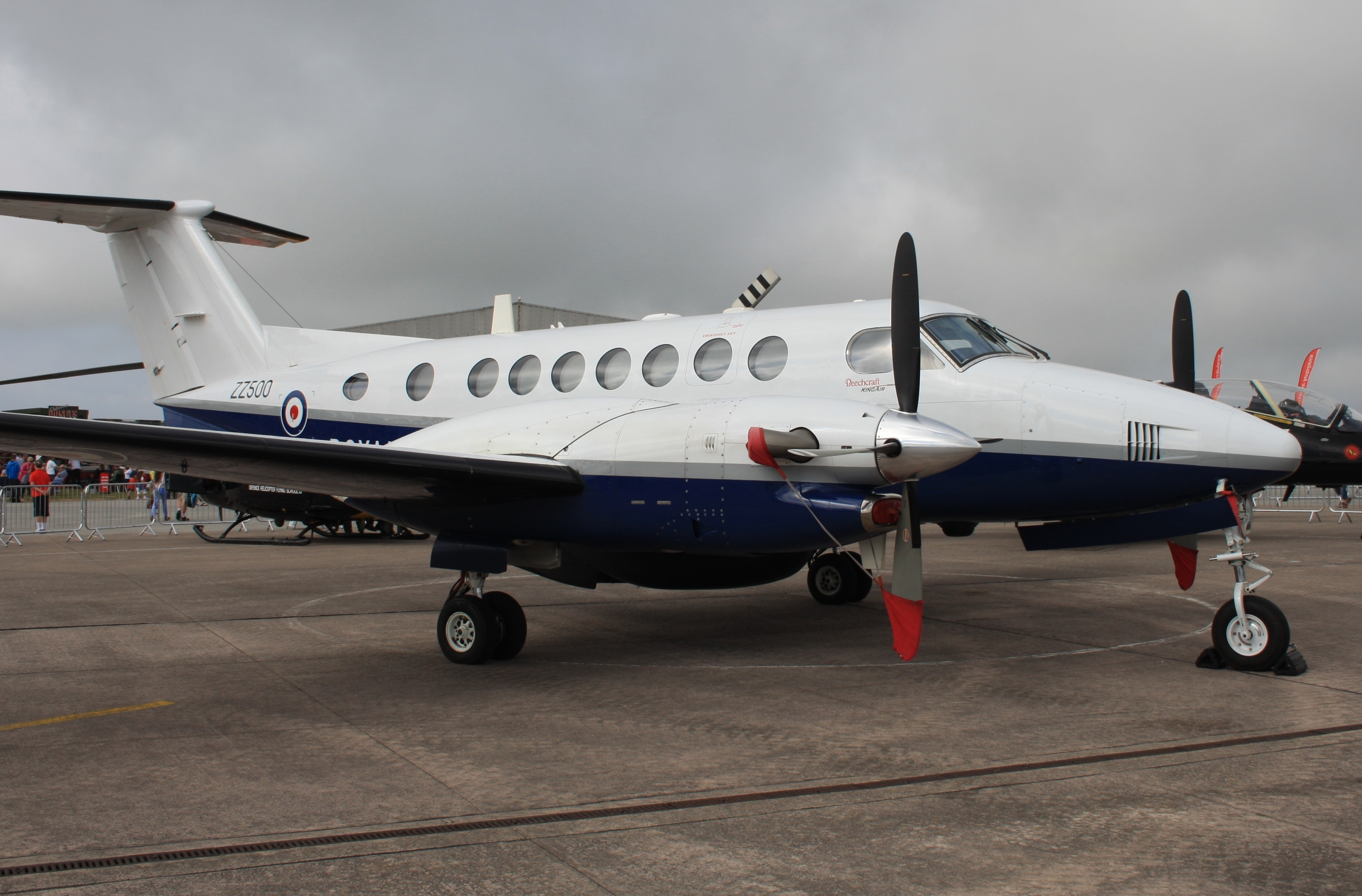
An Avenger T1 of 750 Naval Air Squadron

- **750 Naval Air Squadron** – Avenger T1
- 751 Naval Air Squadron
- 752 Naval Air Squadron
- 753 Naval Air Squadron
- 754 Naval Air Squadron
- 755 Naval Air Squadron
- 756 Naval Air Squadron
- 757 Naval Air Squadron
- 758 Naval Air Squadron
- 759 Naval Air Squadron
- 760 Naval Air Squadron
- 761 Naval Air Squadron
- 762 Naval Air Squadron
- 763 Naval Air Squadron
- 764 Naval Air Squadron
- 765 Naval Air Squadron
- 766 Naval Air Squadron
- 767 Naval Air Squadron
- 768 Naval Air Squadron
- 769 Naval Air Squadron
- 770 Naval Air Squadron
- 771 Naval Air Squadron
- 772 Naval Air Squadron
- 773 Naval Air Squadron
- 774 Naval Air Squadron
- 775 Naval Air Squadron
- 776 Naval Air Squadron
- 777 Naval Air Squadron
- 778 Naval Air Squadron
- 779 Naval Air Squadron
- 780 Naval Air Squadron
- 781 Naval Air Squadron
- 782 Naval Air Squadron
- 783 Naval Air Squadron
- 784 Naval Air Squadron
- 785 Naval Air Squadron
- 786 Naval Air Squadron
- 787 Naval Air Squadron
- 788 Naval Air Squadron
- 789 Naval Air Squadron
- 790 Naval Air Squadron
- 791 Naval Air Squadron
- 792 Naval Air Squadron
- 793 Naval Air Squadron
- 794 Naval Air Squadron
- 795 Naval Air Squadron
- 796 Naval Air Squadron
- 797 Naval Air Squadron
- 798 Naval Air Squadron
- 799 Naval Air Squadron

== Reserve Squadrons ==
Nos. 1830 to 1836 and 1840 to 1844 were designated for the squadrons of the Royal Naval Volunteer Reserve Air Branch during the period from 1947 to 1957 and subsequently formed into five divisions from 1952.

Royal Naval Volunteer Reserve Air Branch squadrons

Scottish Air Division

- 1830 Royal Naval Volunteer Reserve Air Squadron
- 1843 Royal Naval Volunteer Reserve Air Squadron

Northern Air Division

- 1831 Royal Naval Volunteer Reserve Air Squadron
- 1841 Royal Naval Volunteer Reserve Air Squadron

Midland Air Division

- 1833 Royal Naval Volunteer Reserve Air Squadron
- 1844 Royal Naval Volunteer Reserve Air Squadron

Southern Air Division

- 1832 Royal Naval Volunteer Reserve Air Squadron
- 1834 Royal Naval Volunteer Reserve Air Squadron
- 1835 Royal Naval Volunteer Reserve Air Squadron
- 1836 Royal Naval Volunteer Reserve Air Squadron

Channel Air Division

- 1840 Royal Naval Volunteer Reserve Air Squadron
- 1842 Royal Naval Volunteer Reserve Air Squadron

Nos. 1831 and 1832 were repurposed for the Royal Naval Reserve Air Branch squadrons between 1980 and 1982.

Royal Naval Reserve Air Branch squadrons

- 1831 Royal Naval Reserve Air Squadron
- 1832 Royal Naval Reserve Air Squadron

== Aircraft Ferry Units ==
Aircraft collection and delivery

- No.1 Ferry Squadron
- No.2 Ferry Squadron
- No.5 Ferry Squadron

== See also ==
Fleet Air Arm

- List of Fleet Air Arm groups
- List of aircraft units of the Royal Navy
- List of aircraft wings of the Royal Navy
- List of Fleet Air Arm battle honours

Royal Australian Navy

- List of Australian Fleet Air Arm flying squadrons

Royal Air Force

- List of Royal Air Force aircraft squadrons
- List of Royal Air Force aircraft independent flights
- Royal Air Force roundels

Others

- List of active United Kingdom military aircraft
- List of naval aircraft of the United Kingdom
- United Kingdom military aircraft registration number
- United Kingdom aircraft test serials
- British military aircraft designation systems
