= 1710 Naval Air Squadron =

Non-flying squadron of the Royal Navy's Fleet Air Arm

- Squadron badge
- Active: 2010–present
- Country: United Kingdom
- Branch: Royal Navy
- Type: Non-flying squadron
- Role: Scientific and engineering support
- Part of: Fleet Air Arm
- Home station: HMNB Portsmouth
- Website: Official website

Insignia
- Squadron Badge Description: Azure, a barn owl [Tyto Alba] proper displayed grasping in its claws a cogwheel or with two lightning flashes argent in saltaire intertwined (2010)The cogwheel represents mechanical and the lightning electrical engineering, the owl represents wisdom, albeit with raised wings as if alighting, referring to helicopters and flight, a blue background refers to the air and sea

1710 Naval Air Squadron (1710 NAS) is a non-flying Fleet Air Arm (FAA) naval air squadron of the United Kingdom's Royal Navy (RN). The squadron is a support organisation based in HM Naval Base Portsmouth that is tasked with the recovery, repair, modification and scientific support of UK military aviation. It was formed on 27 May 2010 by combining the existing Mobile Aircraft Repair Transport and Salvage Unit (MARTSU), Mobile Aircraft Support Unit (MASU), Naval Aircraft Materials Laboratory (NAML) and other smaller units.

The squadron is currently organised into five departments. The first, Repair, has multiple teams that repair and recover British military helicopters and unmanned air systems worldwide. The second, Modifications, designs, manufactures and fits urgent operational and safety modifications to front line helicopters. The others (Materials, Condition Monitoring, Digital & Data) provide technical and scientific support to British military and commercial aviation.

The unit supports worldwide operations both ashore and afloat.

== Role ==
1710 Naval Air Squadron, although lacking its own aircraft, provides scientific and engineering support to military aviation. The Squadron comprises a team of personnel from all three branches of the armed forces, alongside scientists, who collectively possess the experience, knowledge, and expertise to maintain airframe operations and improve aircraft capabilities. Personnel from the Squadron are deployed globally, including aboard Royal Navy vessels, to assist military aviation efforts. 1710 Naval Air Squadron is equipped with specialised skills and facilities for aircraft repair and modification, in addition to offering scientific guidance and engineering oversight.

The squadron consists of thirteen mobile repair teams that can be deployed globally and it previously maintained a continuous repair team in Afghanistan until the withdrawal of British Forces from the region in late 2014.

== Background ==
The Naval Aircraft Materials Laboratory (NAML) was established in 1946, originally known as the Materials Laboratory, at the Royal Naval Aircraft Repair Yard, Fleetlands. Its primary focus was to address all metallurgical and chemical issues that impacted operations within the yard. This later became the Defense Equipment and Support Materials Integrity Group.

During a significant restructuring of the Fleet Air Arm support units, multiple smaller units including the Naval Aircraft Transport and Slavage Units (NATSU) and the Mobile Aircraft Repair Unit (MARU), were merged to create the Mobile Aircraft Repair, Transportation and Salvage Unit (MARTSU), in 1959. The capabilities for modification and repair within the Fleet Air Arm were later unified through the collaboration of MARTSU and the Naval Aircraft Trials and Installation Unit (NATIU), to establish the Mobile Aircraft Support Unit (MASU), in 1986. The Fleet Forward Support (Air) was formed at RNAY Fleetlands on 1 April 2008 by merging MASU and the Defense Equipment and Materials Integriaty Group, which later moved to HMNB Portsmouth, Hampshire, in March 2010.

== Commanding Officers ==
List of commanding officers of 1710 Naval Air Squadron with date of appointment.

- Commander J.B. Osmond, RN, from 27 May 2010
- Commander K.D. Whitfield, RN, from 16 May 2011
- Commander T.S. Jefferson, RN, from 19 May 2013
- Commander S.L. Malkin, RN, from 2 April 2015
- Commander C. Ling, RN, from 12 February 2016
- Commander P. Barker, RN, from 2019
- Commander N. Almond, RN, from 2022
- Commander B. Gillies, RN, from 2024
- Commander N. Wallace RN from 2026

== See also ==
- List of Fleet Air Arm aircraft squadrons
