= VF-871 =

VF-871 may refer to:

- Strike Fighter Squadron 143 (VFA-143), also known as the "Pukin Dogs", a United States Navy fighter squadron based at Naval Air Station Oceana, Virginia, previously known as VF-871 from 20 July 1950 to 4 February 1953
- VF-871 (Royal Canadian Navy), a Royal Canadian Navy fighter squadron based at naval air station HMCS Shearwater, Nova Scotia, Canada from November 1952 to 16 March 1959
