= Admiralty Naval Aircraft Materials Laboratory =

Research department of the British Royal Navy

Department overview
- Formed: 1949
- Preceding Department: Materials Laboratory
- Dissolved: 1966
- Jurisdiction: Government of the United Kingdom
- Headquarters: Fleetlands, Gosport, England
- Parent Department: Admiralty

The Admiralty Naval Aircraft Materials Laboratory was a research department of the British Royal Navy responsible for dealing with metallurgical and chemical problems affecting naval aircraft from 1949 to 1966.

== History ==
The Naval Aircraft Materials Laboratory was opened in 1946 as the Materials Laboratory at Holton Heath (originally as an outstation of the Central Metallurgical Laboratory) at the Royal Naval Aircraft Repair Yard, Fleetlands. It dealt with all metallurgical and chemical problems affecting work in the yard, and later it concerned itself with Naval aircraft problems from further afield. It acquired the title Naval Aircraft Materials Laboratory in the early 1950s and since then its status and title have not changed. It is a department of the Royal Naval Aircraft Repair Yard, Fleetlands and is ultimately under the control of the Director-General Aircraft (Naval).

== Timeline ==
- Admiralty Materials Laboratory, 1947-1977
- Admiralty Naval Aircraft Materials Laboratory, 1953-1966

== See also ==
- British Admiralty

== Sources ==
- Archives, The National. "Admiralty and Ministry of Defence: Materials Laboratory, later Naval Aircraft Materials Laboratory: Reports". discovery.nationalarchives.gov.uk. National Archive, ADM 291, 1949-1966.
