= RAF Fraserburgh =

Former Royal Air Force station in Aberdeenshire, Scotland

RAF Fraserburgh RAF Inverallochy
- Inverallochy, Aberdeenshire in Scotland

Site information
- Type: Royal Air Force Satellite Station
- Owner: Air Ministry
- Operator: Royal Air Force
- Controlled by: RAF Fighter Command * No. 13 Group RAF; 1941-42; RAF Coastal Command * No. 18 Group RAF; 1942-43 & 1944-45; RAF Flying Training Command * No. 21 Group RAF; 1943-44

Location
- Shown within Aberdeenshire RAF Fraserburgh (the United Kingdom)
- Coordinates: 57°40′05″N 1°56′04″W

Site history
- Built: 1940/41
- In use: December 1941 – June 1945
- Battles/wars: European theatre of World War II

Airfield information
- Elevation: 16 metres (52 ft) AMSL
Runways
Direction	Length and surface
00/00	Tarmac
00/00	Tarmac
00/00	Tarmac

Royal Air Force Fraserburgh, or more simply RAF Fraserburgh, is a former Royal Air Force satellite station located in Aberdeenshire, Scotland, 3.2 miles (5.1 km) south east of Fraserburgh and 12.3 miles (19.8 km) north west of Peterhead.

== History ==
The following units were based at Fraserburgh at some point:

- No. 8 Operational Training Unit RAF (May 1942 – February 1943)
- Relief Landing Ground of No. 14 (Pilots) Advanced Flying Unit (May 1943 – September 1944)
- No. 279 Squadron RAF
- No. 281 Squadron RAF
- 823 Naval Air Squadron
- 838 Naval Air Squadron
- 883 Naval Air Squadron
- No. 2792 Squadron RAF Regiment
- No. 2807 Squadron RAF Regiment
- No. 2848 Squadron RAF Regiment

Cairnbulg Castle was used as the Officers' Mess. The domestic sites were situated either side of the B9033 road, between the Castle and the airfield, and known as Inverallochy RAF Camp and Tershinty RAF Camp.

== Current use ==
The north and north western sides have been taken over by housing, and the rest of the site is used for farming.

== See also ==
- List of former Royal Air Force stations
