= List of naval aircraft of the United Kingdom =

This is a list of all naval aircraft ever used by the United Kingdom. This list includes lists of naval aircraft used by the UK at specific time periods such as the Modern day and World War II. It will also include two lists, one for the all the aircraft ever used by the Royal Naval Air Service, the United Kingdom's original naval Air Service, and all the aircraft ever used by the Fleet Air Arm, the United Kingdom's current naval air service.

== Aircraft of the Royal Naval Air Service ==
- List of aircraft of the Royal Naval Air Service

== Aircraft of the Fleet Air Arm ==
- List of aircraft of the Fleet Air Arm

== World War II ==
- List of Fleet Air Arm aircraft in World War II

== Modern day ==
- List of active United Kingdom military aircraft

== Gallery of progression of British naval fighters ==
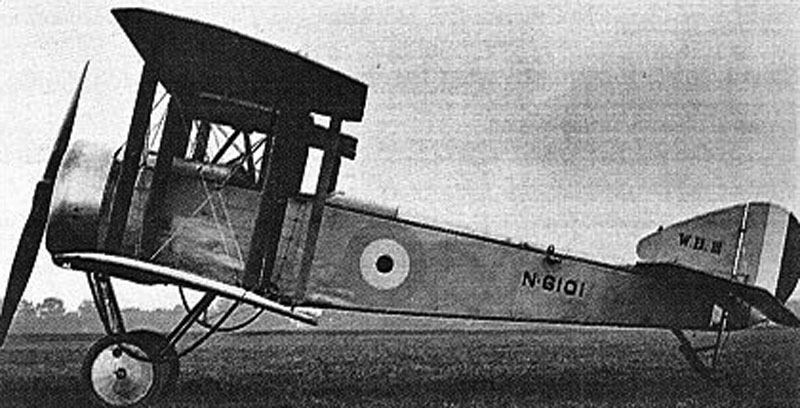
A Beardmore W.B.III a Sopwith Pup fighter specifically adapted for use on ships. Saw service during World War I.

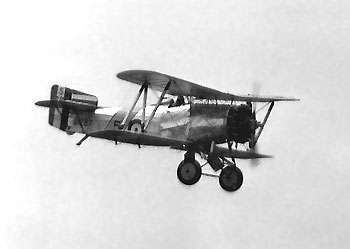
Fairey Flycatcher naval fighter built in large numbers and used in the interwar period.

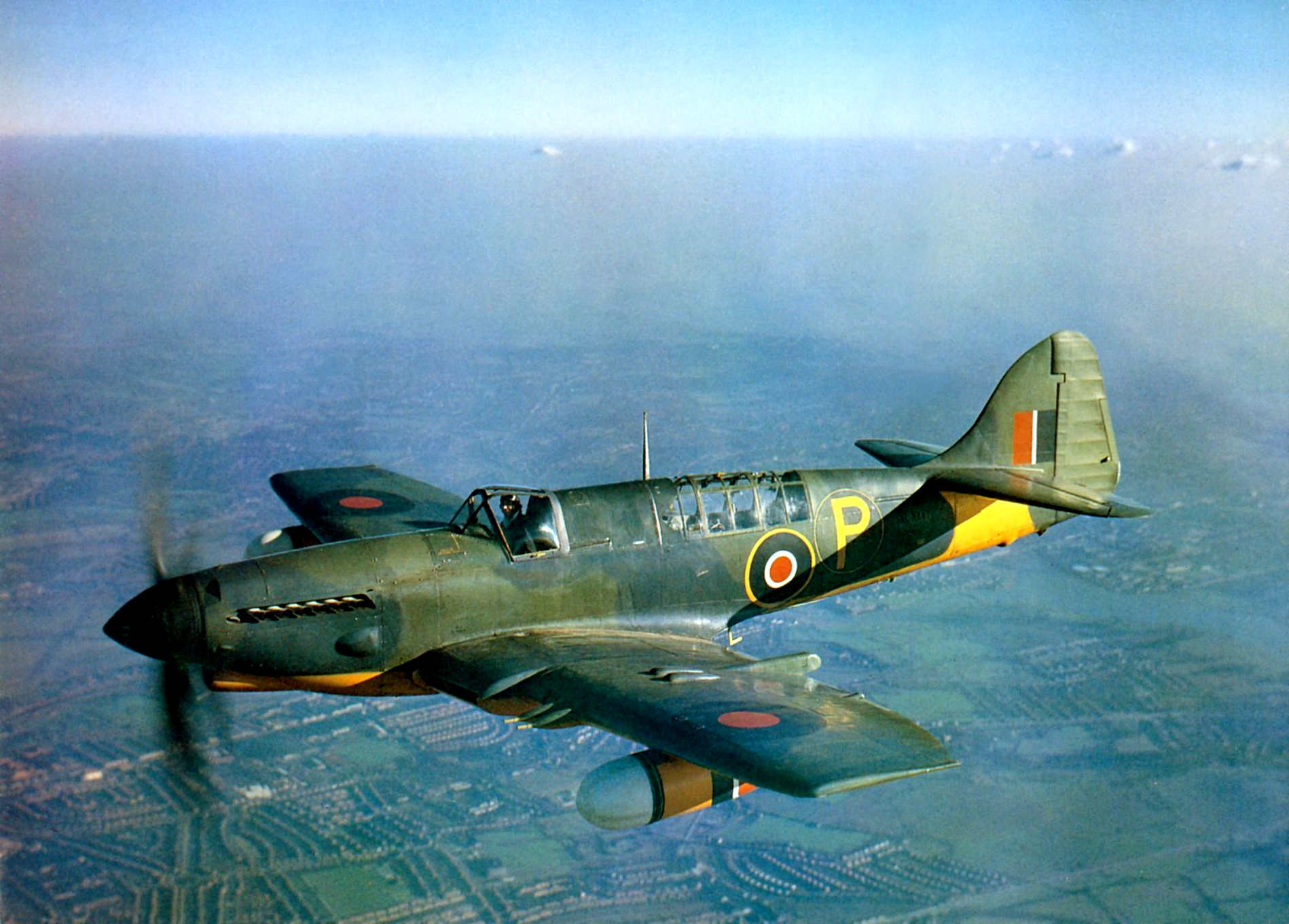
Fairey Firefly a British naval fighter of World War II. Replaced Fairey Fulmar. Also used as Fighter-bomber. Other British naval fighters of World War II are adaptions of land based aircraft for use on ships or carriers such as the Sea Hurricane and Supermarine Seafire.

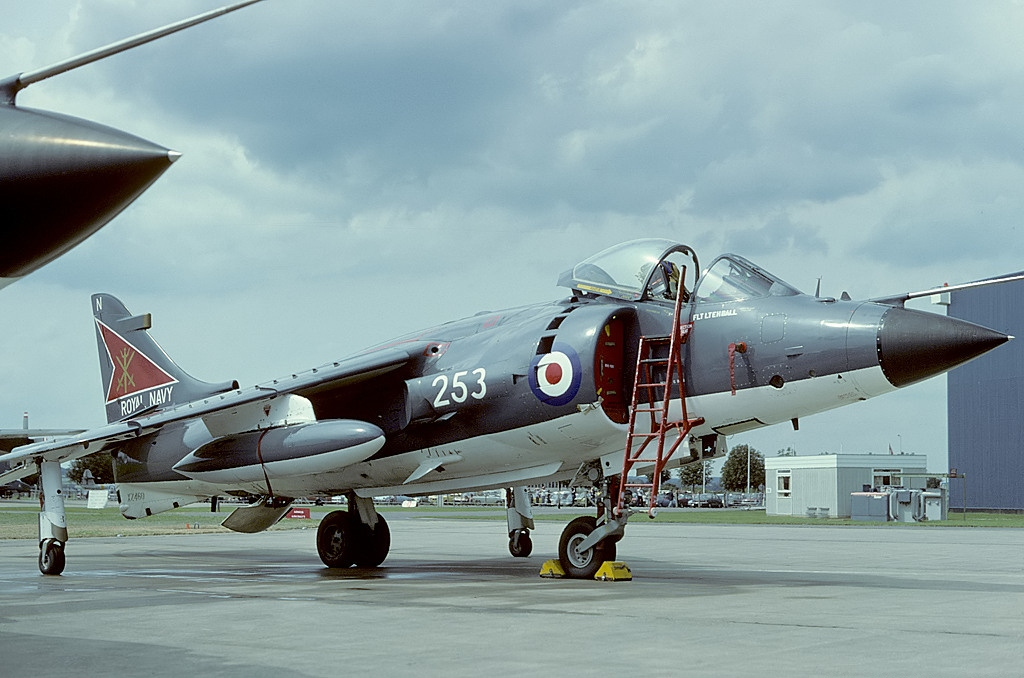
A British Aerospace Sea Harrier. This naval aircraft saw extensive use in the Falklands War. Another British naval aircraft of the Cold War with a long service life was the British variant of the US naval F-4 Phantom the F-4K Phantom.

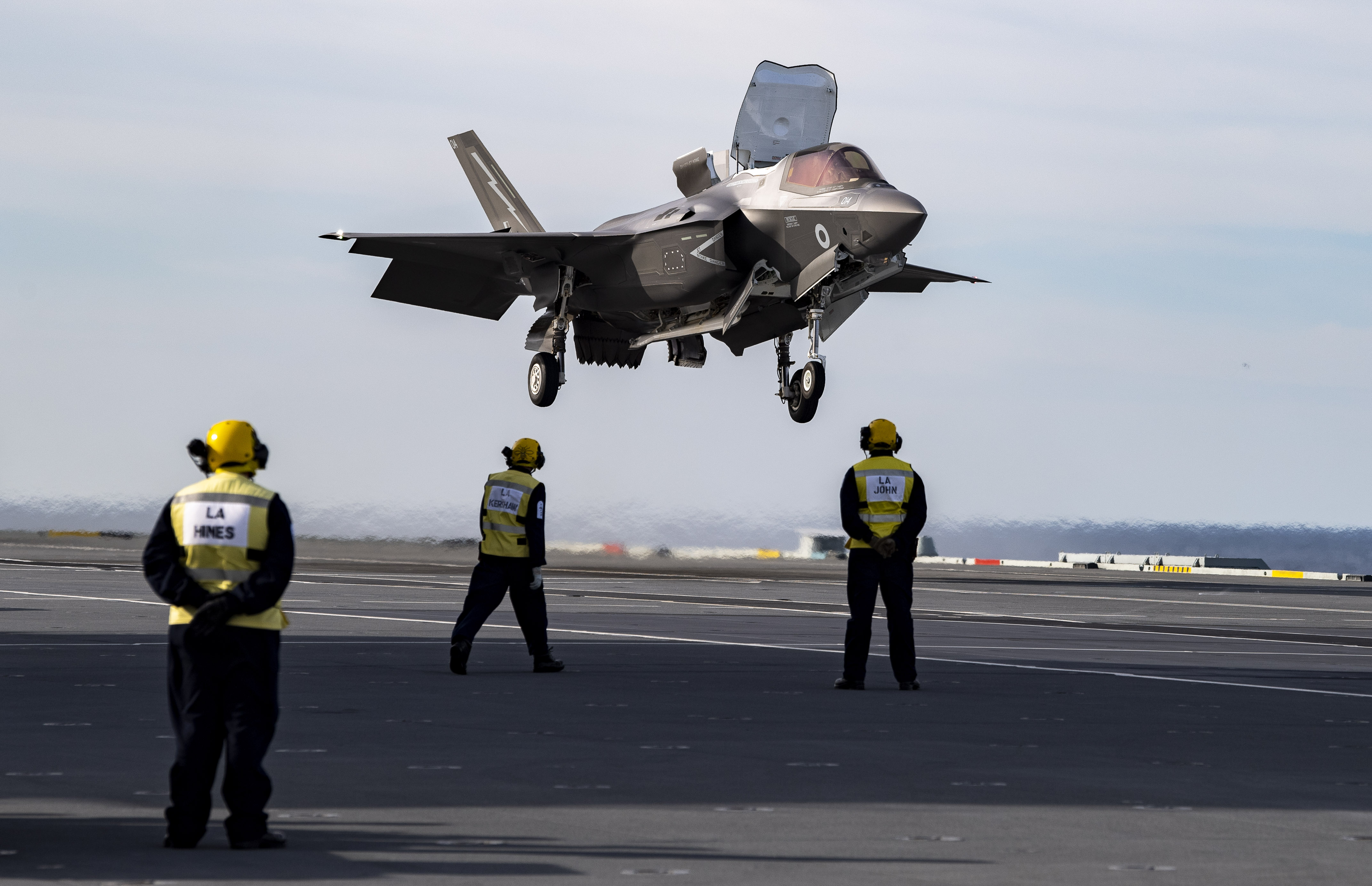
F-35B Lightning II the current UK naval fighter made by Lockheed Martin. As of 2022 most advanced naval fighter in the World. Only upcoming naval fighter that could match it will be naval variant of Chinese Shenyang FC-31 dubbed J-35.
