= 871 Naval Air Squadron =

Former flying squadron of the Royal Canadian Navy

871 Naval Air Squadron VF 871
- 871 NAS badge
- Active: 1 May 1951 – 16 March 1959
- Country: Canada
- Branch: Royal Canadian Navy
- Type: Single-seat fighter squadron
- Role: Fighter squadron
- Size: Squadron
- Part of: Fleet Air Arm
- Home station: See Naval air stations section for full list.
- Mottos: Pugnandum surgimus (Latin for 'We rise to fight')

Insignia
- Squadron badge description: Azure, a base barry wavy of four argent and azure over all a winged centaur argent reguardent and arresting holding in the position to shoot to the sinister a bow and arrow gules the latter flighted and barbed argent and bow stringed of the same a quiver gules filled with arrows and issuing from the dexter side of the centaur being suspended by a strap or from the sinister shoulder the centaur winged maned and unguled or (1954)
- Identification Markings: VG-AAA+, 140+ (Sea Fury June 1952); 100-120, later in range 295-510 (Banshee)

Aircraft flown
- Fighter: Hawker Sea Fury; McDonnell F2H Banshee

871 Naval Air Squadron (871 NAS), also known as VF 871, was a squadron of the Royal Canadian Navy (RCN). It was established in May 1951 and was disbanded in March 1959.

== History ==
=== Fighter squadron (1951-1959) ===
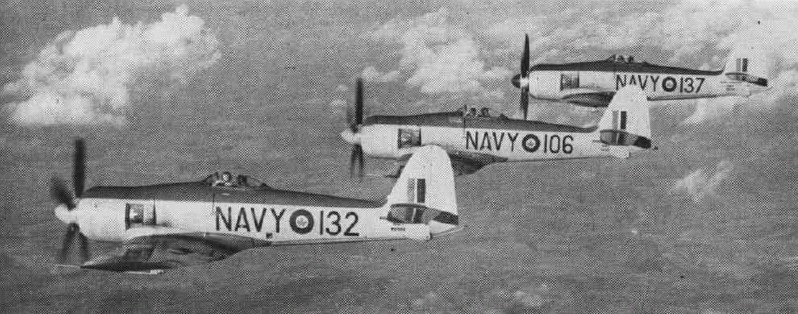
Hawker Sea Fury FB.11 of VF-871, Royal Canadian Navy, from the aircraft carrier HMCS Magnificent (CVL 21)

871 Naval Air Squadron was established within the numbering system of the Commonwealth Navies as a Royal Canadian Navy unit, resulting from the renumbering of 883 Naval Air Squadron at HMCS Shearwater, Halifax, Nova Scotia, on 1 May 1951. Initially equipped with ten Hawker Sea Fury FB. 11 fighter aircraft, it served as part of the 30th Carrier Air Group on Majestic-class light aircraft carrier, HMCS Magnificent, primarily tasked with fleet air defense.

In November 1952, the squadron adopted an American-style designation, becoming VF 871. Following a re-equipment phase in August 1956, it transitioned to eight McDonnell F2H Banshee jet fighter aircraft. By 1958, these aircraft were upgraded to carry AIM-9 Sidewinder air-to-air missiles, and that same year, the squadron was deployed aboard the Majestic-class aircraft carrier, HMCS Bonaventure. Ultimately, VF 871 was integrated into VF 870 at RCAF Station Dartmouth on 16 March 1959.

== Aircraft operated ==
The squadron has operated a couple of different aircraft types:

- Hawker Sea Fury FB.11 fighter-bomber (May 1951 - August 1956)
- McDonnell F2H Banshee jet fighter aircraft (August 1956 - March 1959)

== Naval air stations and aircraft carriers ==
871 Naval Air Squadron, VF 871, operated from a naval air stations of the Royal Canadian Navy in Canada and also a couple of Royal Canadian Navy light aircraft carriers:

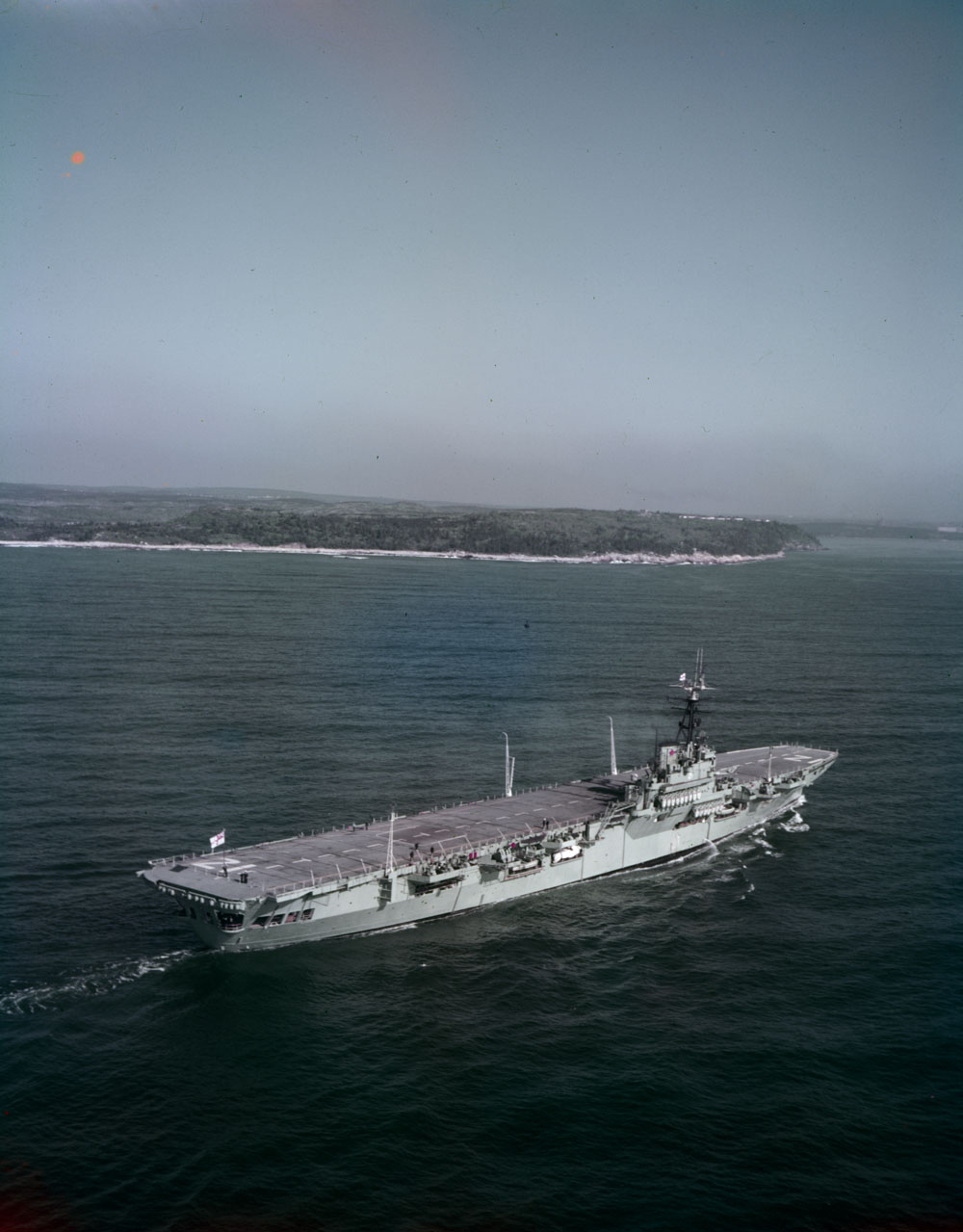
HMCS Magnificent

- HMCS Shearwater, Nova Scotia, (ex-883 Naval Air Squadron) (1 May - August 1951)
- HMCS Magnificent (August - October 1951)
- HMCS Shearwater, Nova Scotia, (October 1951 - 2 June 1952)
- HMCS Magnificent (2 June - 9 October 1952)
- HMCS Shearwater, Nova Scotia, (9 October - November 1952)
- HMCS Magnificent (November - 2 December 1952)
- HMCS Shearwater, Nova Scotia, (2 December 1952 - February 1953)
- RCAF Station Rivers, Manitoba, (February - March 1953)
- HMCS Shearwater, Nova Scotia, (March - 30 May 1953)
- HMCS Magnificent (30 May - July 1953)
- HMCS Shearwater, Nova Scotia, (July - 17 August 1953)
- HMCS Magnificent (17 August - September 1953)
- HMCS Shearwater, Nova Scotia, (September 1953 - 2 July 1954)
- HMCS Magnificent (2 July - September 1954)
- HMCS Shearwater, Nova Scotia, (September 1954 - 4 April 1955)
- HMCS Magnificent (4 April - 7 June 1955)
- HMCS Shearwater, Nova Scotia, (7 June - September 1955)
- HMCS Magnificent (September - 7 December 1955)
- HMCS Shearwater, Nova Scotia, (7 December 1955 - 15 February 1958)
- HMCS Bonaventure (15 February - 29 April 1958)
- Key West (29 April - 15 June 1958)
- HMCS Shearwater, Nova Scotia, (15 June - 13 October 1958)
- RCAF Station Rivers, Manitoba, (CJATC) (13 October - 10 November 1958)
- HMCS Shearwater, Nova Scotia, (10 November - 15 January 1959)
- HMCS Bonaventure (15 January - 27 February 1959)
- HMCS Shearwater, Nova Scotia, (27 February - 16 March 1959)
- absorbed into VF 870 (16 March 1959)

== Commanding officers ==
List of commanding officers of 871 Naval Air Squadron, VF 871:

- Lieutenant(N) W.D. Munro, RCN, from 1 May 1951
- Lieutenant-commander D.H.P. Ryan, RCN, from November 1951
- Lieutenant(N) R. Heath, RCN, from July 1952
- Lieutenant-commander M. Wasteneys, RCN, from 23 March 1953
- Lieutenant-commander J.W. Logan, RCN, from 2 July 1954
- Lieutenant-commander R.A.R. Laidler, CD, RCN, from 13 January 1956
- Lieutenant-commander J.J. Harvie, CD, RCN, from 22 July 1957
- absorbed into VF 870 16 March 1959
