= 883 Naval Air Squadron =

Defunct flying squadron of the Royal Navy's Fleet Air Arm and Royal Canadian Navy

- Active: Royal Navy; 10 October 1941 – 15 November 1942; 18 September 1945 – 23 February 1946; Royal Canadian Navy; 15 May 1947 - 1 May 1951
- Country: United Kingdom; Canada
- Branch: Royal Navy; Royal Canadian Navy
- Type: Single-seat fighter squadron
- Role: Fleet fighter squadron
- Part of: Fleet Air Arm
- Home station: See Naval air stations section for full list.
- Mottos: Ex nubibus vincemus (Latin for 'From the clouds we will conquer') (Royal Canadian Navy)
- Engagements: World War II: Arctic convoys of World War II; Operation Torch
- Battle honours: Arctic 1942; North Africa 1942

Insignia
- Squadron badge (Royal Canadian Navy): Barry wavy of eight white and blue; a lozenge black surmounted by an eagle volant white grasping in the claws a lightning flash fesswise
- Identification Markings (Royal Navy): individual letters (Seafire)
- Identification Markings (Royal Canadian Navy): VG-AAA+ (Seafire & Sea Fury)

Aircraft flown
- Fighter: Hawker Sea Hurricane (RN); Supermarine Seafire (RN & RCN); Hawker Sea Fury (RCN)

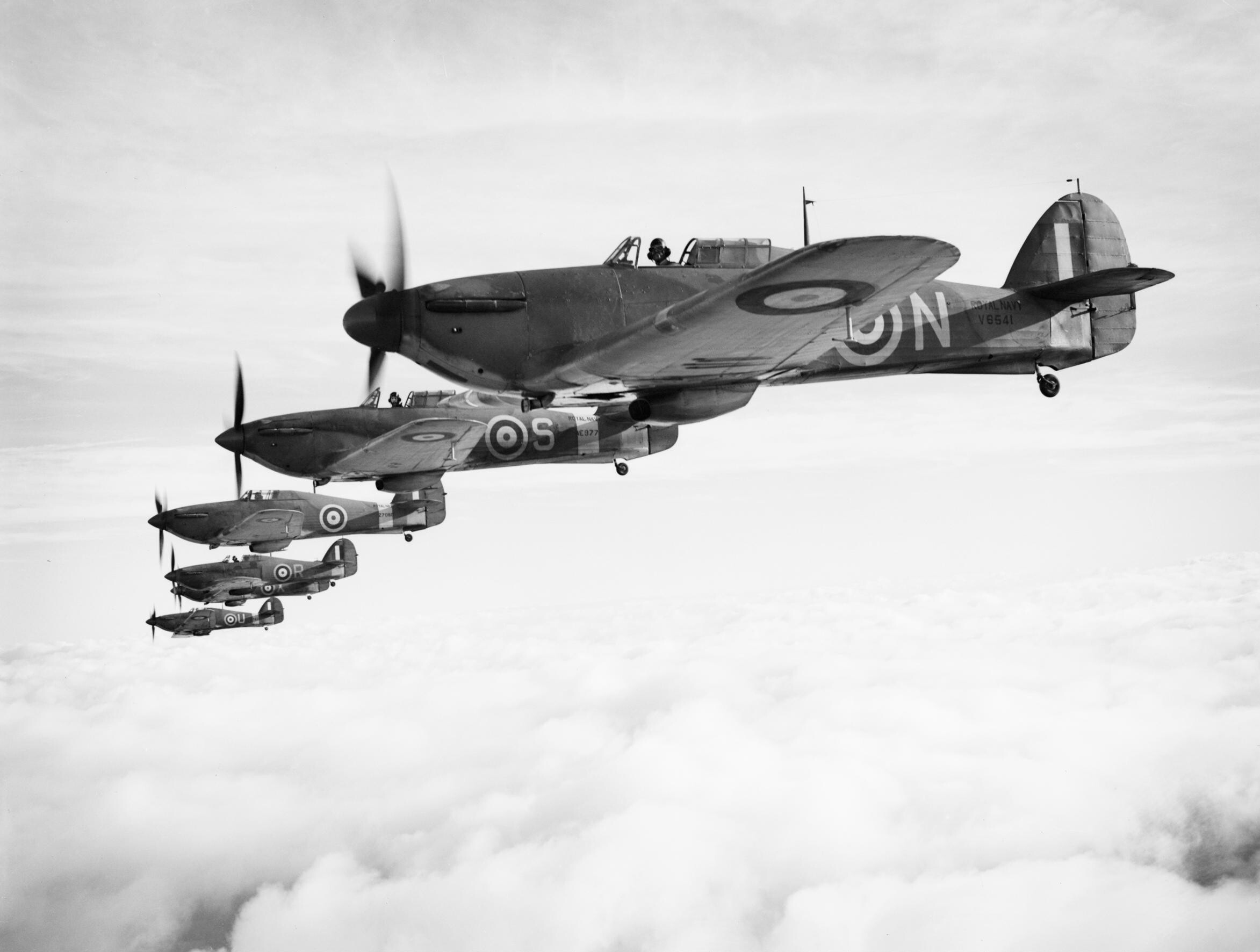
A formation of six Hawker Sea Hurricanes from RNAS Yeovilton, December 1941

883 Naval Air Squadron (883 NAS) was a naval air squadron of the Royal Navy's Fleet Air Arm. It was established in October 1941, and disbanded in February 1946. 883 Squadron RCN formed in May 1947 as a Royal Canadian Navy unit. It was redesignated as 871 Naval Air Squadron on 1 May 1951.

== History ==
=== Royal Navy ===
==== Fleet fighter squadron (1941 - 1943) ====
883 Naval Air Squadron formed at RNAS Yeovilton (HMS Heron), Somerset, on 10 October 1941 as a Fleet Fighter squadron, led by Royal Marines Captain W.H.C. Manson. It was equipped with six Hawker Sea Hurricane Mk Ib, a navalised version of the Hawker Hurricane single seat fighter aircraft.

On 28 January 1942, the squadron moved to Scotland to operate as part of No. 14 Group RAF in Fighter Command. It initially operated from RAF Fraserburgh and then from RAF Peterhead, both in Aberdeenshire.

The squadron relocated to RNAS Machrihanish (HMS Landrail), Argyll and Bute, on 11 May and was back under Fleet Air Arm control. On 16 June it embarked in the name ship of her class, HMS Avenger. The escort carrier was assigned to Arctic convoy operations and the squadron used RNAS Hatston (HMS Sparrowhawk), Orkney, as a shore base.

In September 1942 HMS Avenger was assigned to Convoy PQ18 which consisted forty Allied cargo ships sailing from Scotland and Iceland to Arkhangelsk in the Soviet Union. 883, along with 802 Naval Air Squadron, shot down five Luftwaffe aircraft and damaged seventeen others.

HMS Avenger was later entrusted with providing air cover for Operation Torch during early November. However, on 15 November she was torpedoed and sunk with a heavy loss of life and 883 Naval Air Squadron ceased to exist.

==== Fleet fighter squadron (1945 - 1946) ====
On 18 September 1945 883 Naval Air Squadron reformed at RNAS Arbroath (HMS Condor), Angus. It was equipped with sixteen Supermarine Seafire F Mk.III fighter aircraft, a navalised version of the Supermarine Spitfire. The squadron was intended for the 10th Carrier Air Group with the British Pacific Fleet, but by the time it formed it was no longer required following V-J Day.

The squadron then moved to RNAS Nutts Corner (HMS Pintail), County Antrim, Northern Ireland, in November. Here it swapped its sixteen F Mk.III Supermarine Seafire aircraft for eighteen F Mk.XVs. The squadron was however meant for the Royal Canadian Navy, but this was halted due to resource constraints. The squadron moved to RNAS Machrihanish (HMS Landrail) where it disbanded on 23 February 1946.

=== Royal Canadian Navy ===
==== Fleet fighter squadron (1947 - 1951) ====
883 Naval Air Squadron was established as a unit of the Royal Canadian Navy at RCAF Station Dartmouth, Nova Scotia, on 15 May 1947. Initially, it was equipped with twelve Supermarine Seafire F Mk XV fighter aircraft, designated for fleet air defence aboard HMCS Warrior, as part of the 18th Carrier Air Group. In September 1948, the squadron transitioned to eight Hawker Sea Fury FB.11 fighter-bomber aircraft and underwent a reorganisation in November, resulting in its transfer to the 19th Carrier Air Group, with which it subsequently deployed on HMCS Magnificent. However, in a shift of policy, the squadron returned to the 18th Carrier Air Group in January 1951, but was redesignated as 871 Naval Air Squadron on 1 May of the same year.

== Aircraft operated ==
The squadron has operated a number of different aircraft types, including:

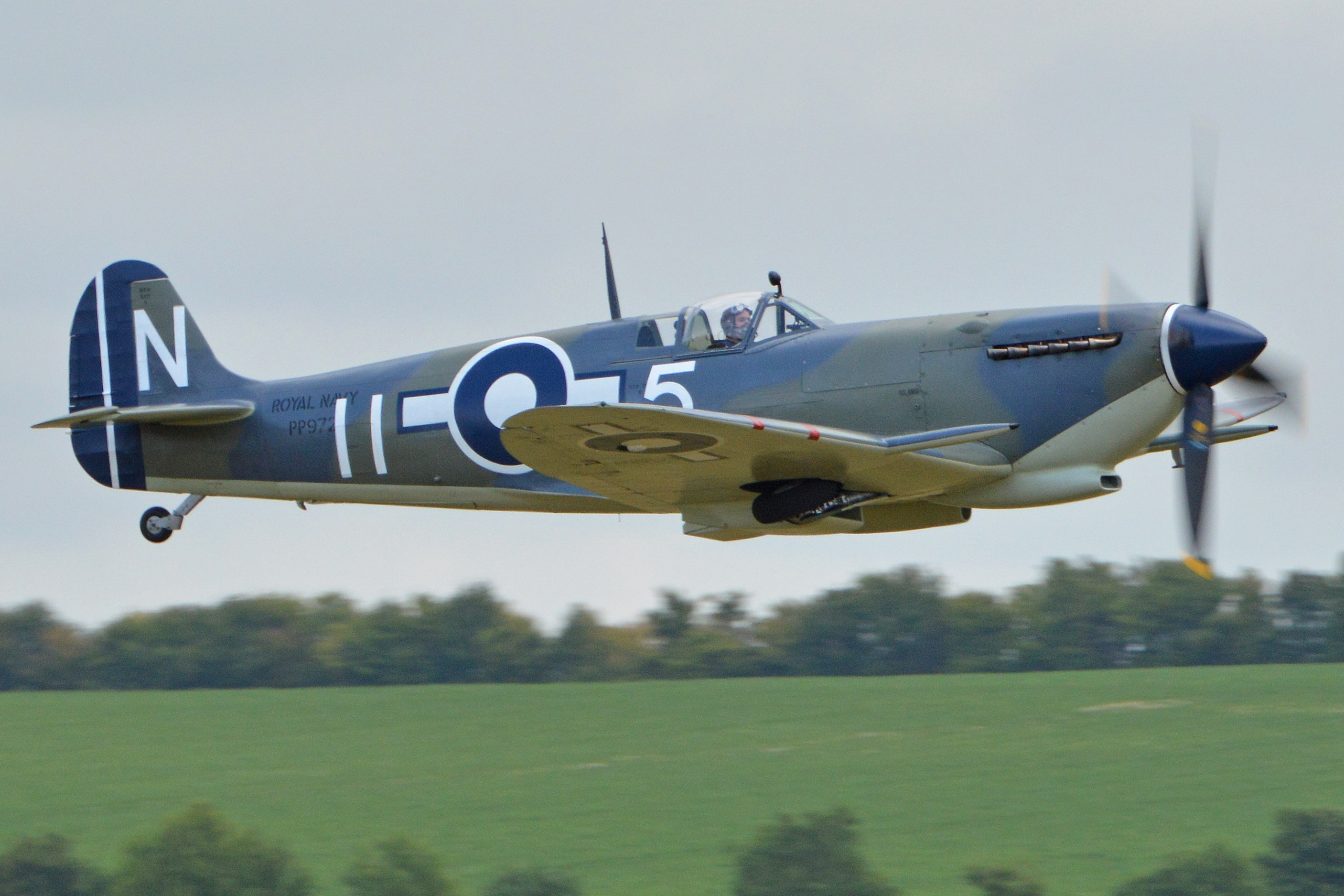
Supermarine Seafire

=== Royal Navy ===
- Hawker Sea Hurricane Mk Ib fighter aircraft (October 1941 - September 1942)
- Hawker Sea Hurricane Mk IIb fighter aircraft (September - November 1942)
- Supermarine Seafire F Mk.III fighter aircraft (September - December 1945)
- Supermarine Seafire F Mk.XV fighter aircraft (November 1945 - February 1946)

=== Royal Canadian Navy ===
- Supermarine Seafire F Mk.XV fighter aircraft (May 1947 - September 1948)
- Hawker Sea Fury FB.11 fighter-bomber aircraft (September 1948 - May 1951)

== Battle honours ==
The battle honours awarded to 883 Naval Air Squadron are:

- Arctic 1942
- North Africa 1942

== Naval air stations and aircraft carriers ==
=== Royal Navy ===
883 Naval Air Squadron operated from a number of naval air stations of the Royal Navy, and Royal Air Force stations in the UK, and a Royal Navy escort carrier:

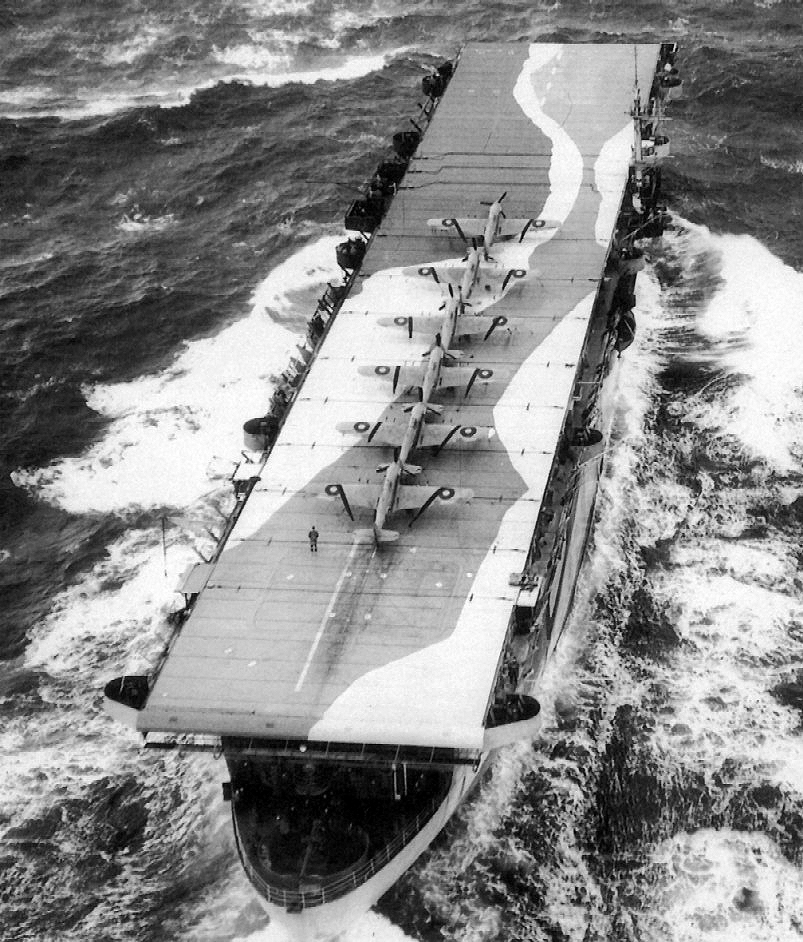
HMS Avenger (D14) with six Hawker Sea Hurricane on deck

1941 - 1942

- Royal Naval Air Station Yeovilton (HMS Heron) (10 October - 5 December 1941)
- Royal Naval Air Station St Merryn (HMS Vulture) (5 - 19 December 1941)
- Royal Naval Air Station Yeovilton (HMS Heron) (19 December 1941 - 28 January 1942)
- Royal Air Force Fraserburgh (14 Gp) (28 January - 15 February 1942)
- Royal Air Force Peterhead (14 Gp) (15 February - 11 May 1942)
- Royal Naval Air Station Machrihanish (HMS Landrail) (11 May - 16 June 1942)
- HMS Avenger (16 June - 27 August 1942)
- Royal Naval Air Station Hatston (HMS Sparrowhawk) (27 August - 3 September 1942)
- HMS Avenger (3 - 25 September 1942)
- Royal Naval Air Station Hatston (HMS Sparrowhawk) (25 September - 16 October 1942)
- HMS Avenger (16 October - 15 November 1942)
- ship sunk (15 November 1942)

1945 - 1946

- Royal Naval Air Station Arbroath (HMS Condor) (18 September - 7 November 1945)
- Royal Naval Air Station Nutts Corner (HMS Pintail) (7 November 1945 - 21 February 1946)
- Royal Naval Air Station Machrihanish (HMS Landrail) (21 - 23 February 1946)
- disbanded (23 February 1946)

=== Royal Canadian Navy ===
883 Squadron RCN operated from a naval air station of the Royal Canadian Navy in Canada, a Royal Canadian Air Force station and a couple of airbases overseas, also a couple of Royal Canadian Navy aircraft carriers:

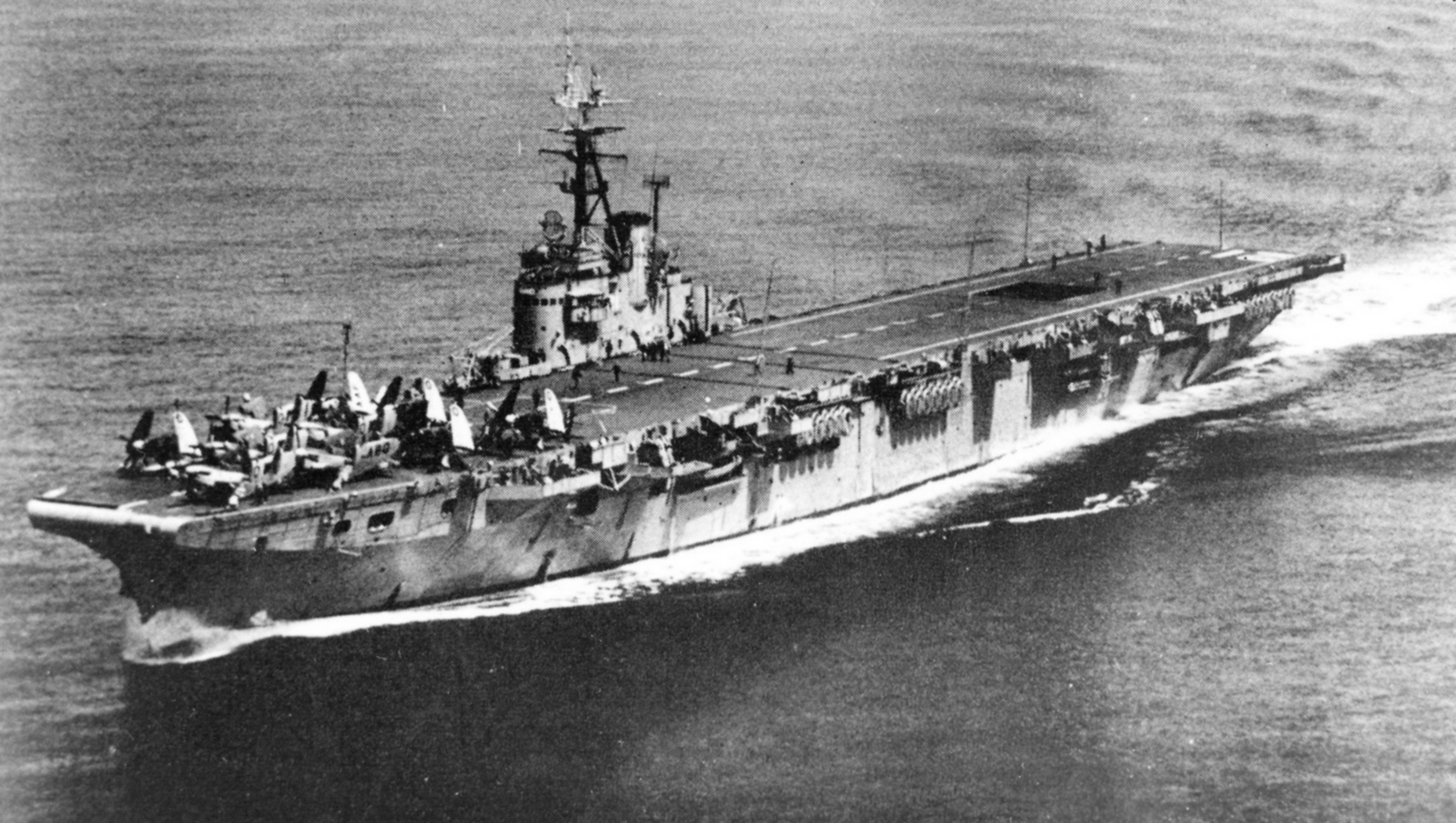
HMCS Magnificent

1947 - 1951

- RCAF Station Dartmouth (15 May - November 1947)
- HMCS Warrior (November - 21 November 1947)
- RCAF Station Dartmouth (21 November 1947 - August 1948)
- RCAF Station Rivers (August - September 1948)
- HMCS Shearwater (September 1948 - May 1949)
- RCAF Station Rivers (May - June 1949)
- Naval Air Station Quonset Point (Detachment DLP USS Saipan (CVL-48)) (June - September 1949)
- HMCS Shearwater (September 1949 - January 1950)
- HMCS Magnificent (January - February 1950)
- HMCS Shearwater (February - April 1950)
- HMCS Magnificent (April - June 1950)
- HMCS Shearwater (June - 22 August 1950)
- HMCS Magnificent (22 August 1950)
- Royal Naval Air Station Eglinton (HMS Gannet) (August 1950)
- HMCS Magnificent (September - 27 November 1950)
- HMCS Shearwater (27 November 1950 - 5 February 1951)
- HMCS Magnificent (5 February - March 1951)
- HMCS Shearwater (March 1951)
- HMCS Magnificent (March 1951)
- HMCS Shearwater (27 April - 1 May 1951)
- became 871 Squadron RCN (1 May 1951)

== Commanding officers ==
=== Royal Navy ===
List of commanding officers of 883 Naval Air Squadron.

- Captain W.H.C. Manson, RM, from 10 October 1941
- Lieutenant(A) P.W.V. Massey, DSC, RN, from 10 April 1942
- disbanded 15 November 1942
- Lieutenant Commander(A) T.J.A. King-Joyce, RN, from 18 September 1945
- disbanded 23 February 1946

Note: Abbreviation (A) signifies Air Branch of the RN or RNVR.

=== Royal Canadian Navy ===
List of commanding officers of 833 Squadron RCN:

- Lieutenant-commander R.A. Monks, RCN, from 15 May 1947
- Lieutenant-commander J.B. Fotheringham, RCN, from January 1948
- Lieutenant-commander R.A.B. Creery, RCN, from 1 December 1948
- lieutenant(N) W.D. Munro, RCN, May 1950
- became 871 Squadron RCN 1 May 1951
