= Fleetlands Heliport =

Fleetlands ~~DARA Fleetlands~~ ~~RNAY Fleetlands~~
- IATA: none; ICAO: EGVF

Summary
- Owner: Standard Aero
- Location: Gosport, Hampshire, England
- Elevation AMSL: 23 ft (7.0 m)
- Coordinates: 50°50′05″N 001°10′06″W
- Website: Vector Aerospace

Map
- Location in Hampshire

Helipads
Number	Length		Surface
Number	ft	m	Surface
H1	98	30	Concrete
H2			Concrete
H3			Concrete
H4	82	25	Concrete
H5	82	25	Concrete
H6	82	25	Concrete
H7	115	35	Concrete

Fleetlands is a heliport operated by Standard Aero located within Gosport, Hampshire, England.

== History ==
In 1940 a Royal Naval Air Yard, RNAY Fleetlands, was opened here; it maintained naval fighters until helicopters became most popular within the Fleet Air Arm.

The control of Fleetlands was transferred to the newly formed Defence Aviation Repair Agency and the site became DARA Fleetlands which looked after all the helicopters within the British Armed Forces. During February 2008 the site was transferred to Vector Aerospace and renamed Fleetlands. Vector Aerospace has since been purchased by Standard Aero who now operates the site

== Current use ==
The heliport is currently used by Standard Aero for use with their nearby maintenance, repair and overhaul facility.

== See also ==
- RNAY Wroughton
