= 870 Naval Air Squadron =

Former flying squadron of the Royal Canadian Navy

870 Naval Air Squadron VF-870
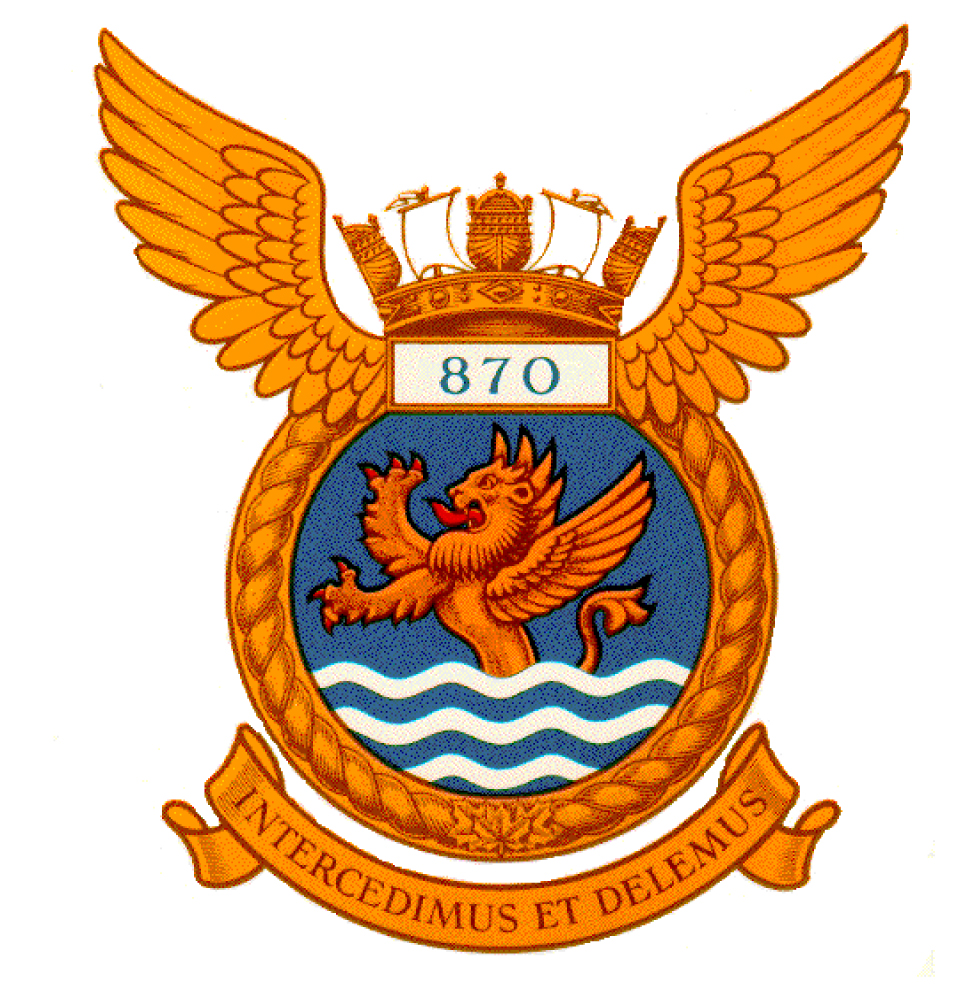
- Active: 1 May 1951 – 30 March 1954; 1 November 1955 – 7 September 1962
- Disbanded: 7 September 1962
- Country: Canada
- Branch: Royal Canadian Navy
- Type: Fighter squadron
- Mottos: Intercedimus et delemus (Latin for 'To intercept and to destroy')
- Colors: White and blue

Insignia
- Squadron badge: Azure issuant from a base barry wavy of three Argent and Azure a winged demi lion Or armed and langued Gules.(The design shows a lion rising from the water by means of wings and assuming a fighting posture.)
- Squadron code: BC (May 1951–June 1952)

870 Naval Air Squadron (870 NAS), also known as VF-870, was a squadron of the Royal Canadian Navy (RCN). It was formed when 803 Naval Air Squadron of the Royal Navy was renumbered to 870 NAS on 1 May 1951. It operated throughout the 1950s and early 1960s before disbanding on 7 September 1962. It was the first RCN squadron to operate jet aircraft.

== History ==
870 Naval Air Squadron was formed on 1 May 1951 when 803 Naval Air Squadron of the Royal Navy's Fleet Air Arm was re-numbered. It was initially based at RCNAS Shearwater, Nova Scotia, with the Squadron operating the Hawker Sea Fury FB.11. In November 1952, 870 NAS adopted an American-styled squadron designation becoming VF-870. On 24 September 1953, the Squadron relocated to RCAF Summerside on Prince Edward Island. VF-870 had its first deployment in January 1954 when it was attached to HMCS Magnificent (CVL 21), it finished its deployment on 9 March. The Squadron stood down for the first time on 30 March.

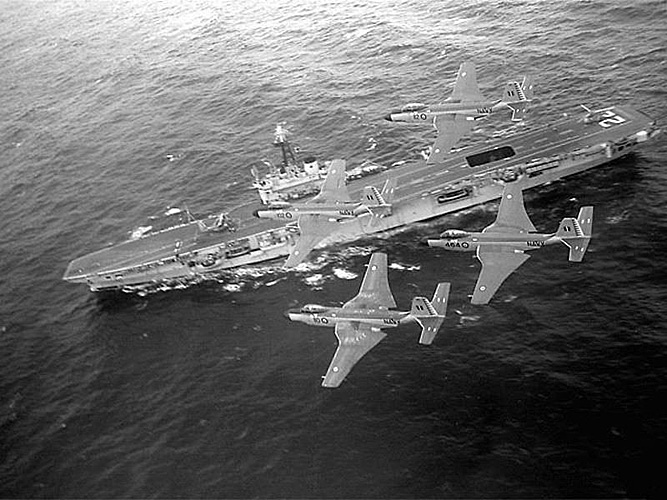
Four McDonnell F2H-3 Banshees of VF-870 in flight over HMCS Bonaventure (CVL 22), in the late 1950s.

VF-870 reformed on 1 November 1955, this time equipped with 10 McDonnell F2H-3 Banshees, becoming the first jet squadron in the Royal Canadian Navy. The commanding officer of VF-870 at its reformation was future Canadian Chief of Defence Staff, Lt. Cdr. Robert Hilborn Falls. A total of 39 Banshees were eventually purchased second-hand from the United States Navy (USN) for a cost of $25 million, serving with VF-870, VF-871 and VX-10. VF-870 was attached, along with VF-871, to the aircraft carrier HMCS Bonaventure (CVL 22) – Canada's newest carrier – from which it would deploy. While not deployed, VF-870 was based at RCNAS Shearwater. The Squadron participated in the 1956 Canadian International Air Show in Toronto. The Squadron suffered a loss in August 1957, when a Banshee crashed into a Grumman Avenger AS.3, with one aircraft taking off as the other was landing. VF-870 made their first deployment on 7 September 1957, which lasted until 30 October.

On 16 March 1959, VF-871 amalgamated with VF-870 thus leaving the Squadron as the only RCN unit to operate the Banshee. The Squadron made its final deployment on HMCS Bonaventure on 9 April 1962, lasting until 29 June 1962. While not deployed, VF-870 flew intercepts in the Canadian sector of NORAD. VF-870 disbanded for the last time on 7 September 1962. Throughout its service, the Royal Canadian Navy lost 12 of the 39 Banshees it had purchased, including those of VF-870. A replacement for the Banshee never came to fruition making VF-870 one of only three RCN squadrons to ever operate a jet fighter.

== Aircraft operated ==
Aircraft operated included:

- Hawker Sea Fury FB.11 (1 May 1951–30 Mar 1954)
- McDonnell F2H-3 Banshee (1 Nov 1955–7 Sep 1962)

== Commanding officers ==
Commanding officers included:

- Lieutenant-Commander D. D. Peacocke (May 1951–Feb 1953)
- Lieutenant-Commander D. M. Macleod (Feb 1953–Apr 1954)
- Lieutenant-Commander R. H. Falls (Nov 1955–Dec 1957)
- Lieutenant-Commander W. J. Walton (Jan 1958–Apr 1960)
- Lieutenant-Commander K. S. Nicolson (Apr 1960–Sep 1962)
