= List of aircraft of the Royal Australian Navy =

This is a list of aircraft of the Royal Australian Navy, including past and present aircraft operated by the Navy of Australia.

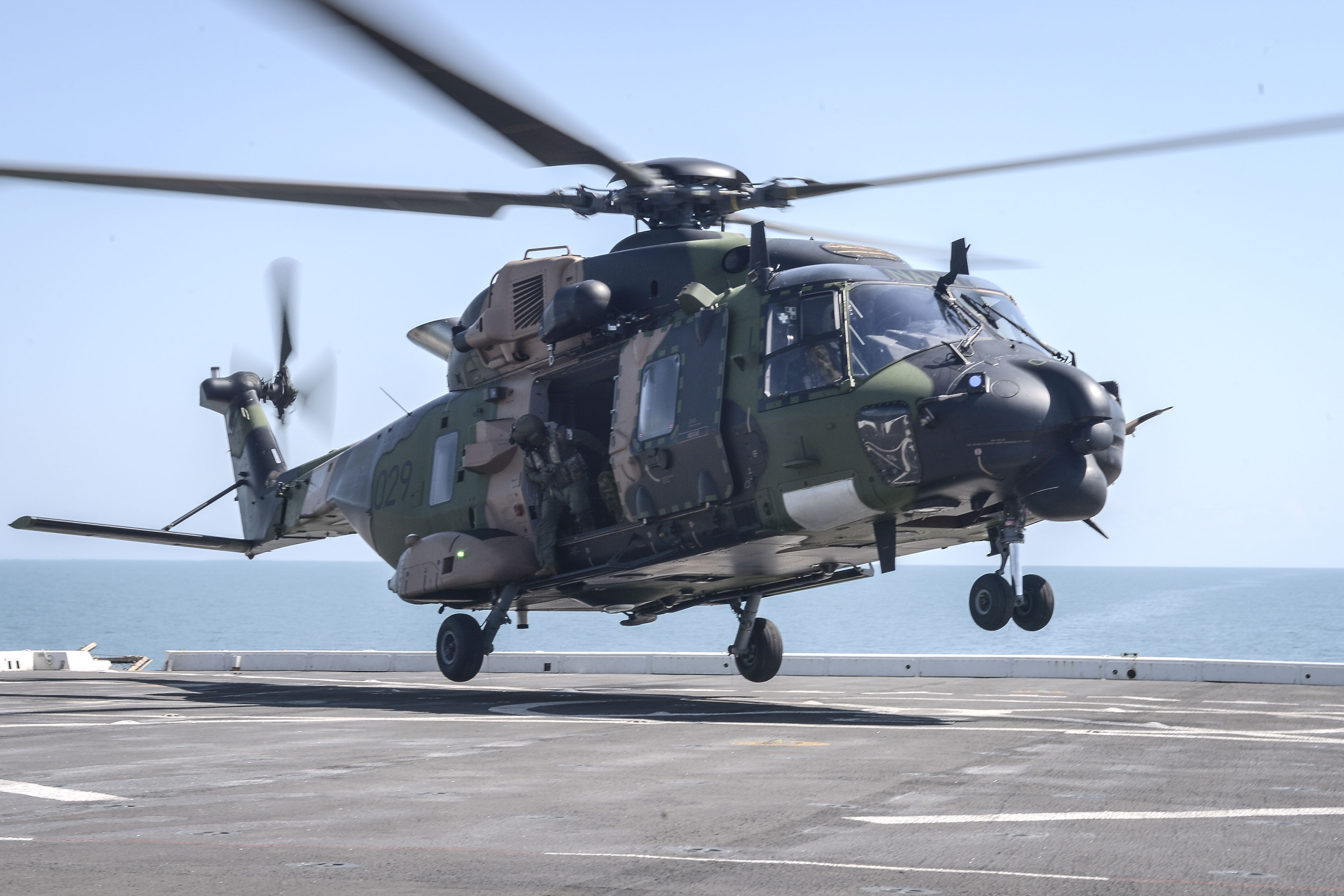
A Royal Australian Navy MRH-90 in 2015

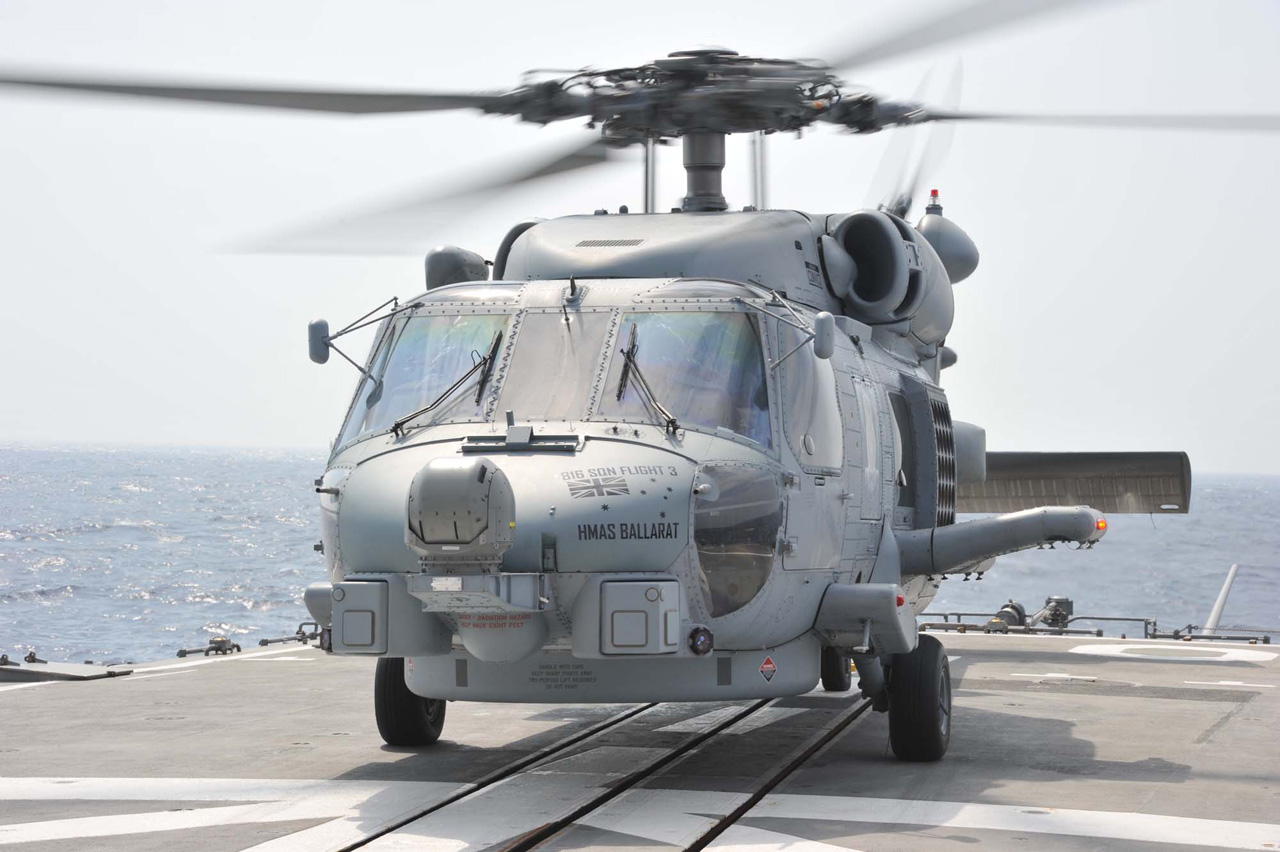
RAN SH-60, 2020

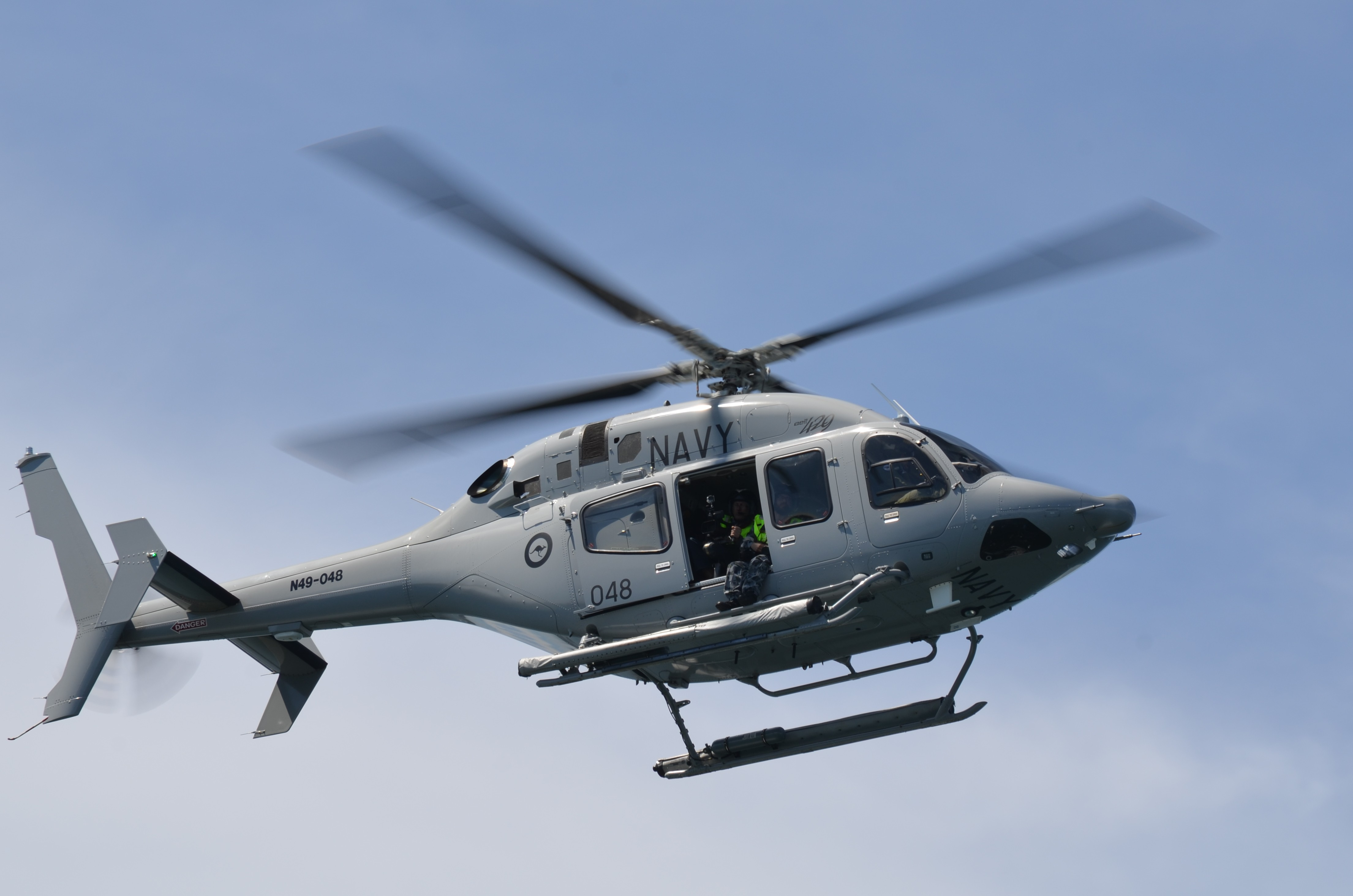
A Royal Australian Navy Bell 429

== Present ==
Aircraft	Origin	Type	Versions	In service	Notes
MH-60 Seahawk	United States	ASW	MH-60R	23	Operated by 816 Squadron. One was ditched in the Philippine Sea in October 2021.
Eurocopter EC135	Germany	Training helicopter	EC135 T2+	15	Training aircraft shared with Army

== Historic ==
=== A ===
Aircraft type	Variants	Origin	Role	Service period	Notes
N22 Aerospatiale AS.350 Squirrel	AS 350B Squirrel; AS 350BA Squirrel	France	Rotary wing trainer, light utility, communication, survey, search and rescue, aerobatic display helicopter	1984–2017	24 helicopters. Operated by No. 723 Squadron RAN and the Australian Defence Force Helicopter School
N42 AgustaWestland AW109	A109E Power	Italy; United Kingdom	Two-crew trainer, general utility helicopter	2007–2012	Four helicopters were leased from Raytheon Australia in 2007. Operated by No. 723 Squadron RAN
A11 Auster Autocar	J/5G Autocar	United Kingdom	Four-seat land-based communications aircraft	1953–1963	Two aircraft. Operated by Nos 723, 724 and 725 Squadrons.
ANA Avro 504	Avro 504L	United Kingdom	Single-seat fighter-bomber, trainer seaplane	1920–1921	One aircraft. The 504L was operated by the Australian Air Corps in support of the Royal Australian Navy. The aircraft was embarked on HMAS Australia and HMAS Sydney. ANA stood for Australian Naval Aircraft.

=== B ===
Aircraft type	Variants	Origin	Role	Service period	Notes
N9 Bell UH-1 Iroquois	UH-1B Iroquois; UH-1C Iroquois	United States	Search and rescue, training, utility transport helicopter	1964–1989	Seven helicopters. Operated by No. 723 Squadron RAN. The UH-1H Iroquois were operated by the joint American and Australian Experimental Military Unit. The Iroquois were embarked on board the destroyer HMAS Tobruk.
N49 Bell 429 GlobalRanger		United States	Training, utility helicopter	2012–2019	Three helicopter. Operated by No. 723 Squadron RAN
Bombardier Dash 8	DHC-8-202Q Dash 8	Canada	Twin-engine land-based hydrographic survey aircraft	2009–present	One ex-civil aircraft. Operated by the Laser Airborne Depth Sounder Flight RAN
N5 Bristol Sycamore	HR.Mk 50 Sycamore; HR. Mk 51 Sycamore	United Kingdom	Sea-air rescue and training helicopter	1953–1961	13 helicopters. Operated by Nos 723 Squadron RAN and 724 Squadron RAN. The Sycamores were embarked on board the aircraft carriers HMS Vengeance, HMAS Sydney and HMAS Melbourne.

=== C ===
Aircraft type	Variants	Origin	Role	Service period	Notes
N14 CAC/Aermacchi MB 326	MB 326H "Macchi"; CAC CA-30	Italy; Australia	Two-seat land-based basic and advanced jet trainer aircraft	1970–1983	Ten aircraft. Operated by No. 724 Squadron RAN
A20 CAC Wirraway	CA-16 Wirraway	Australia	Two-seat land-based trainer, fighter aircraft	1948–1957	17 ex-RAAF aircraft. Operated by Nos 723 Squadron RAN and 724 Squadron RAN
N17 CAC/Bell 206B-1 Kiowa	Bell 206B-1 Kiowa; CAC CA-32 Kiowa	United States; Australia	Light utility, communication and survey helicopter	1973–2000	Six helicopters. Operated by No. 723 Squadron RAN. The Kiowas were embarked on board the survey ship HMAS Moresby

=== D ===
Aircraft type	Variants	Origin	Role	Service period	Notes
N4 de Havilland Sea Venom	FAW Mk 20 Sea Venom; FAW.Mk 53 Sea Venom	United kingdom	Two-seat carrier-borne all-weather fighter-bomber aircraft	1956–1973	39 aircraft. Operated by Nos. 723 Squadron RAN, 724 Squadron RAN, 805 Squadron RAN and 808 Squadron RAN. The FAW Mk 21s were on loan from Royal Navy. The Sea Venoms were embarked on the aircraft carrier HMAS Melbourne
A17 de Havilland Tiger Moth	DH.82A Tiger Moth	United Kingdom; Australia	Two-seat land-based biplane trainer, instructional aircraft	1948–1958	Three ex-RAAF aircraft. Operated by No. 723 Squadron RAN
N6 de Havilland Vampire	Sea Vampire T. Mk 22; Vampire T. Mk 34; Vampire T. 34A	United Kingdom; Australia	Two-seat land-based pilot trainer aircraft	1954–1972	13 aircraft. Operated by Nos 723 Squadron RAN and 724 Squadron RAN
N2 Douglas Dakota	C-47A Dakota; C-47B Dakota	United States	Twin-engine land-based transport, navigational trainer aircraft	1949–1977	Four aircraft. Operated by Nos 723 Squadron RAN, 724 Squadron RAN, 725 Squadron RAN and 851 Squadron RAN

=== E ===
Aircraft type	Variants	Origin	Role	Service period	Notes
N52 Eurocopter EC135	EC 135 T2+	Europe	Training helicopter	2016–present	15 helicopters

=== F ===
Aircraft type	Variants	Origin	Role	Service period	Notes
A10 Fairey III	Fairey IIID	United Kingdom	Three-seat spotter, reconnaissance seaplane	1921-1929	six aircraft. Six aircraft were operated by RAAF in support of the Royal Australian Navy. Embarked on the survey ship HMAS Geranium.
N1 Fairey Firefly	T. Mk 2 Firefly; FR. Mk IV Firefly; AS. Mk 5 Firefly; FR Mk 5 Firefly; T. Mk 5 Firefly; TT Mk 5 Firefly; AS Mk 6 Firefly; TT Mk 6 Firefly	United Kingdom	Two-seat carrier-borne fighter, anti-submarine, reconnaissance aircraft	1948–1966	108 aircraft. Operated by Nos 723 Squadron RAN, 724 Squadron RAN, 725 Squadron RAN, 816 Squadron RAN, 817 Squadron RAN and 851 Squadron RAN. The Fireflies were embarked on board aircraft carriers HMS Vengeance and HMAS Sydney
N3 Fairey Gannet	AS. Mk 1 Gannet; AS. Mk 4 Gannet; T. Mk 2 Gannet; T. Mk 5 Gannet	United Kingdom	Three-seat carrier-borne anti-submarine aircraft	1955–1967	36 aircraft. Operated by Nos 724 Squadron RAN, 725 Squadron RAN, 816 Squadron RAN and 817 Squadron RAN. The Gannets were embarked on board the aircraft carrier HMAS Melbourne
Fokker F27	F-27-500 Friendship	Netherlands	Twin-engine land-based hydrographic survey aircraft	1992–2019	One ex-civil aircraft. Operated by the Laser Airborne Depth Sounder Flight RAN

=== G ===
Aircraft type	Variants	Origin	Role	Service period	Notes
N12 Grumman S-2 Tracker	S-2E Tracker; S-2G Tracker	United States	Four-crew twin-engine anti-submarine patrol aircraft	1967–1984	32 aircraft. Operated by Nos 816 Squadron RAN and 851 Squadron RAN. The Trackers were embarked on the aircraft carrier HMAS Melbourne. See Grumman S-2 Tracker in Australian service.

=== H ===
Aircraft type	Variants	Origin	Role	Service period	Notes
Hawker Sea Fury	FB.Mk 11 Sea Fury	United Kingdom	Single-seat carrier-borne fighter-bomber aircraft	1949–1962	101 aircraft. Operated by Nos 723 Squadron RAN, 724 Squadron RAN, 725 Squadron RAN, 805 Squadron RAN, 808 Squadron RAN and 850 Squadron RAN. The Sea Furies were embarked on board the aircraft carries HMS Vengeance and HMAS Sydney.
N 15 Hawker Siddeley 748	748 Series 2	United Kingdom	Twin-engine land-based transport, fleet electronic warfare training aircraft	1973–2000	Two aircraft. Operated by Nos 723 Squadron RAN and 851 Squadron RAN

=== K ===
Aircraft type	Variants	Origin	Role	Service period	Notes
N29 Kaman SH-2G Super Seasprite	SH-4G(A) Super Seasprite	United States	Search and rescue, anti-submarine, anti-surface warfare helicopter	2004–2008	11 helicopters. Operated by No. 805 Squadron RAN

=== M ===
Aircraft type	Variants	Origin	Role	Service period	Notes
N13 McDonnell Douglas A-4G Skyhawk	A-4G Skyhawk; TA-4G Skyhawk	United States	Single-seat carrier-borne light attack, fighter-bomber aircraft	1967–1984	20 aircraft. Operated by Nos 724 Squadron RAN and 805 Squadron RAN. The Skyhawks were embarked on board the aircraft carrier HMAS Melbourne
MRH-90 Taipan	Multi Role Helicopter	EU	TTH: Tactical Transport Helicopter	2011-2022	6 Operated by 808 Squadron. In September 2022, the Australian government ordered 12 MH-60Rs to replace the MRH-90s. The MRH-90 Taipan was withdrawn from Navy service in 2022, a year earlier then its retirement overall in 2023.

=== N ===
Aircraft type	Varants	Origin	Role	Service period	Notes
N40 NHIndustries NH90	MRH-90 Taipan	Europe	Multi-role transport helicopter	2013–2022	Six helicopters. Operated by No. 808 Squadron RAN

=== S ===
Aircraft types	Variants	Origin	Role	Service period	Notes
N24 Sikorsky SH-60 Seahawk	S-70B-2 Seahawk	United States	Anti-submarine, anti-surface, search and rescue helicopter	1988–2017	16 helicopters. Operated by No. 816 Squadron RAN . The Seahawks were embarked on board the Adelaide-class frigates and Anzac-class frigates. Retired 2017
N48 Sikorsky MH-60R Seahawk Romeos	MH-60R Seahawk Romeos	United States	Anti-submarine, anti-surface, search and rescue helicopter	2013–present	24 helicopters. Operated by Nos 725 Squadron RAN and 816 Squadron RAN
Sikorsky H-5 Dragonfly	H03-S	United States	Air-sea rescue, communications helicopter	1950–1951	Two helicopter on loan from the US Navy. The helicopter was embarked on board the aircraft carrier HMAS Sydney during the Korean War.
Sopwith 1½ Strutter	1 Strutter	United States	Two-seat reconnaissance biplane	1918–1919	Three aircraft. The aircraft were embarked on board the battlecruiser HMAS Australia
Sopwith Baby	Baby	United States	Single-seat scout, bomber seaplane	1917 only	One aircraft. Embarked on board the light cruiser HMAS Brisbane in 1917.
Sopwith Camel	Camel 2F1	United Kingdom	Single-seat shipboard fighter-scout biplane	1917–1919	Seven aircraft. The Camels were embarked on board the battlecruiser HMAS Australia, and the light cruisers HMAS Sydney and HMAS Melbourne
Sopwith Pup	Pup	United Kingdom	Single-seat fighter-scout biplane	1917–1918	Three aircraft. The Pups were embarked on board the cruisers HMAS Australia and HMAS Sydney
Supermarine Sea Otter	Type 309 Sea Otter	United Kingdom	Three or four-seat carrier-borne air-sea rescue amphibian aircraft	1948–1953	Three aircraft. Operated by No. 723 Squadron RAN. The Sea Otters were embarked on the aircraft carrier HMAS Sydney
A9 Supermarine Seagull III	Seagull III	United Kingdom	Three-seat spotter, reconnaissance amphibian aircraft	1925–1936	Nine aircraft. Operated by the RAAF in support of the Royal Australian Navy. The Seagull IIIs were embarked on board the seaplane tender HMAS Albatross, the cruisers HMAS Australia and HMAS Canberra.
A2 Supermarine Walrus or (Seagull V)	Seagull V	United Kingdom	Three-seat spotter, reconnaissance amphibian aircraft	1935–1947	24 aircraft. Operated by the RAAF in support of the Royal Australian Navy. The aircraft were embarked on board the cruisers HMAS Australia, HMAS Canberra, HMAS Hobart, HMAS Perth and HMAS Sydney, plus the naval vessels HMAS Manoora and HMAS Westralia.
A58 Supermarine Spitfire	Spitfire Mk VC; Spitfire VIII	United Kingdom	Single-seat land-based trainer, ground instructional aircraft	1947–1952	14 Ex-RAAF aircraft

=== V ===
Aircraft type	Variants	Origin	Role	Service period	Notes
A48 Vought OS2U Kingfisher	OS2U-3 Kingfisher	United States	Two-seat spotter, reconnaissance seaplane	1948 only	One aircraft. One RAAF aircraft was embarked on board the Antarctic exploration vessel HMAS Wyatt Earp in 1948.
Vultee A-31 Vengeance		United States	Two seat land based trainer, ground instructional aircraft	1948–1951	12 ex-RAAF aircraft. See Vultee Vengeance in Australian service

=== W ===
Aircraft type	Variants	Origin	Role	Service period	Notes
Wackett Widgeon	Widgeon Mk I Widgeon Mk II	Australia	spotter, reconnaissance amphibian aircraft	1927–1933	Two aircraft. The Widegons were embarked on board the seaplane tender HMAS Albatross.
N8 Westland Scout	Scout AH Mk 1	United Kingdom	Survey, utility helicopter	1963–1977	Two helicopters. Operated by No. 723 Squadron RAN. The Scouts were embarked on board the survey ship HMAS Moresby
N7 Westland Wessex	Wessex Mk 31A; Wessex Mk 31B	United Kingdom	Carrier-borne anti-submarine, search and rescue, utility transport helicopter	1962–1989	27 helicopter. Operated by Nos 723 Squadron RAN, 725 Squadron RAN, 816 Squadron RAN and 817 Squadron RAN. The Wessex helicopters were embarked on board the aircraft carriers HMAS Sydney and HMAS Melbourne. Also the replenishment oiler HMAS Success, and the escort maintenance ship HMAS Stalwart.
N16 Westland Sea King	Sea King Mk 50; Sea King Mk 50A; Sea King Mk 50B	United Kingdom	Carrier-borne anti-submarine, search and rescue, utility transport helicopter	1974–2011	12 helicopters. Operated by No. 817 Squadron RAN. The Sea kings were embarked on board the aircraft carrier HMAS Melbourne. Also the two Kanimbla-class landing platform amphibious ships, and the escort maintenance ship HMAS Stalwart, and the replenishment oiler HMAS Success and the heavy landing ship HMAS Tobruk.

== Civilian aircraft operating under contract ==
Aircraft type	Variants	Origin	Role	Service period	Notes
AgustaWestland AW139	AW139		Search and rescue helicopter	2017-	One helicopter operated by CHC Helicopters
Dassault/Dornier Alpha Jet	Alpha Jet A	France/Germany		2017-2019	Three aircraft were operated by Air Affairs/Top Aces
IAI Westwind	1124 Westwind, 1124A Westland II	Israel	Target tug aircraft		Operated by Pel-Air based at HMAS Albatross (air station).
Learjet 35	Learjet 35, Learjet 36	United States	Support aircraft		Operated by Pel-Air based at HMAS Albatross (air station).

== Drones/RAV ==
=== Present ===
Aircraft type	Variants	Origin	Role	Service period	Notes
Boeing Insitu ScanEagle		United States			Operated by No. 822X Squadron RAN
Schiebel Camcopter S-100		Austria			Operated by No. 822X Squadron RAN

=== Historic ===
Aircraft type	Variants	Origin	Role	Service period	Notes
N28 BAE Kalkara	MQM-107E Kalkara	United States / Australia	Remotely-controlled high-performance target drone	1998–2008	21 aircraft
N11 GAF Jindivik	Jindivik Mk 203A; Jindivik Mk 203B	Australia	Remotely-controlled high-performance target drone	1966–2000	42 aircraft
GAF Turana	Turana	Australia	target drone	1971–1979	23 aircraft
N10 Northrop KD2R Shelduck	KD2R-5 Shelduck	United States	target drone	1963–1973	

== List of guided missiles of the Royal Australian Navy ==
=== Current ===
Model	Variants	Origin	Role	Service period	Notes
AGM-114 Hellfire	AGM-114B; AMG-114K; ANG-114N	United States	Air-to-surface missile	2014–present	Carried by the HM-60R Seahawk Romeos helicopters
Mark 46 torpedo		United States	Lightweight anti-submarine torpedo	Present	Carried by the S-70B-2 Seahawk helicopters
Mark 48 torpedo		United States	Heavyweight anti-submarine, anti-ship torpedo	1980–present	Carried by the Collins-class submarines.
Mark 54 Lightweight Torpedo		United States	Lightweight anti-submarine torpedo	2013–present	Carried by the HR-60R Seahawk Romeos helicopters
MU90 Impact		France / Italy	Lightweight anti-submarine torpedo	2008–present	Carried by the Anzac-class frigates and Hobart-class destroyers.
RGM-84 and UGM-84 Harpoon	UGM-84C	United States	Surface-to-surface ant-ship cruise missile	1981-Present	Currently carried on board the Adelaide-class frigates, Hobart-class destroyers and the Collins-class submarines
RIM-66 Standard		United States	Medium-range surface-to-air missile	1975–present	Currently carried on board the Adelaide-class frigates and Hobart-class destroyers.
RIM-162 ESSM		United States	Medium-range surface-to-air missile	2003–present	Currently carried on board the Adelaide-class frigates, Anzac-class frigates and Hobart-class destroyers

=== Historic ===
Model	Variants	Origin	Role	Service period	Notes
AIM-9 Sidewinder	AIM-9B	United States	Short-range air-to-air missile		Obsolete, on longer in service with the Royal Australian Navy. Carried by the A-4G Skyhawk aircraft
AGM-114 Hellfire	AGM-114B; AGM-114K; AGM-114N	United States	Air-to-surface anti-ship missile	2014–present	Carried by the MH-60R Seahawk Romeos helicopters
AGM-119 Penguin	AGM-119B Penguin Mk 2 mod 7	Norway	Air-to-surface anti-ship missile	2004–2008	Obsolete, on longer in service with the Royal Australian Navy. Carried by the SH-2G(A) Super Seasprite helicopters
Ikara		Australia	Surface-to-surface anti-submarine missile	1963–	Obsolete, on longer in service with the Royal Australian Navy. The Ikara was carried on board the Perth-class destroyers and River-class destroyer escorts
Mark 44 torpedo		United States	Lightweight anti-submarine torpedo	1966–	Obsolete, on longer in service with the Royal Australian Navy. Carried by the Sea King Mk 50 and Mk 50A Helicopters. Also carried by the Ikara anti-submarine missile.
Mark 46 torpedo		United States	Lightweight anti-submarine torpedo	Present	Carried by the S-70B-2 Seahawk, Sea King Mk 50 and Mk 50A helicopters, also by the Perth-class destroyers
Mark 48 torpedo		United States	Heavyweight anti-submarine, anti-ship torpedo	1980–present	Carried by the Oberon-class submarines.
Mark 54 Lightweight Torpedo		United States	Lightweight anti-submarine torpedo	2013–present	Carried by the RH-60R Seahawk Romeos helicopters
MU90 Impact		France / Italy	Lightweight anti-submarine torpedo	2008–present	
RGM-84 and UGM-84 Harpoon		United States	Surface-to-surface anti-ship cruise missile	1981-Present	The Harpoon was carried on board the Oberon-class submarines
RIM-7 Sea Sparrow	RIM-7P	United States	Short-range surface-to-air missile	1998–	The Sea Sparrows were carried on board the Anzac-class frigates
RIM-24 Tartar		United States	Medium-range surface-to-air missile	1966–1987	Obsolete, on longer in service with the Royal Australian Navy. The Tartars were carried on board the Perth-class destroyers
RIM-66 Standard	RIM-66B	United States	Medium-range surface-to-air missile	1975–present	The RIM-66 Standard was part of the armament of the Perth-class destroyers
RIM-162 ESSM		United States	Medium-range surface-to-air missile	2003–present	Carried by the Adelaide-class frigates, Anzac-class frigates and Hobart-class destroyers.
Seacat		United Kingdom	Short-range surface-to-air missile	1964–1998	Obsolete, on longer in service with Royal Australian Navy. The Seacats were carried on board the River-class destroyer escorts, and the Daring-class destroyer HMAS Vampire.

== See also ==
- List of aircraft of the Royal Australian Air Force
- List of Australian Army aircraft
