= 724 Squadron RAN =

Royal Australian Navy Fleet Air Arm flying squadron

724 Squadron
- 724 Squadron badge
- Active: 1955–1984
- Disbanded: 30 June 1984
- Country: Australia
- Branch: Royal Australian Navy
- Type: Training squadron
- Role: Operational Training School; Aircrew conversion unit; Fleet requirements trials; Communications
- Part of: Fleet Air Arm
- Home station: HMAS Albatross
- Mottos: Learn and live
- Aircraft: See Aircraft operated section for full list.

Insignia
- Squadron Badge Description: Azure, a fledgling Albatross close wearing a mortar board, standing on two closed books the upper or and the reverseargent all proper (1964)
- Identification Markings: 911, 950-972, 980-996 (All types from 1955); to 863-878 (1958); to 800-809, 841-860, 860-889 (1963); to 800-809, 860-889 (1968)

724 Squadron was a Royal Australian Navy (RAN) Fleet Air Arm (formerly Australian Navy Aviation Group) naval air squadron. The squadron was formed for the first time in the RAN in 1955 and was last disbanded in 1984.

== History ==
724 Squadron was first formed on 10 April 1945 as a Royal Navy naval air communications unit. The squadron made daily flights between Sydney and Melbourne until 31 May 1946 when it was disbanded.

724 Squadron was recommissioned as an Australian unit on 1 June 1955 at the Royal Australian Navy's (RAN) main air station HMAS Albatross. The squadron's role was to carry out fixed-wing conversion training and it was initially equipped with Wirraway, Hawker Sea Fury and Fairey Firefly propeller-driven aircraft and de Havilland Vampire jets.

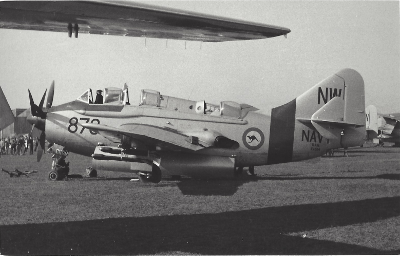
Fairey Gannet T.2 of 724 Squadron

The squadron's role changed in October 1956 when it absorbed most of the decommissioned 723 Squadron's de Havilland Sea Venom fighters and Fairey Gannet anti-submarine aircraft and Bristol Sycamore helicopters. As part of this change 724 Squadron's Wirraways, Sea Furies and Fireflys were transferred to other units. In its new role the squadron provided Sea Venom and Gannet operational training on board the RAN's only aircraft carrier, HMAS Melbourne. Three 724 Squadron pilots were killed during separate flying accidents during 1956.

724 Squadron's make-up continued to change in 1957 and 1958. The Sycamores were transferred back to the recommissioned 723 Squadron in early 1957 and the Gannets moved to 725 Squadron during 1958. This left 724 Squadron equipped with Sea Vampires and Sea Venoms. In 1959 the squadron formed an aerobatic team called the Ramjets which was equipped with Sea Venoms and performed at air shows across Australia.

The squadron's role and aircraft inventory expanded during the early 1960s as the RAN wound-down its fixed-wing aircraft operations. 724 Squadron absorbed 725 Squadron in June 1961 and 805 Squadron and 723 Squadron in June and November 1963 respectively. As a result of these changes the squadron's aircraft complement eventually included Sea Venoms, Gannets, Vampires, Fireflies, Dakotas and Autocars. Between 1963 and 1968 724 Squadron and 816 Squadron were the only FAA squadrons operating fixed-wing aircraft. During this time the squadron's roles included all-weather fighter, anti-submarine warfare and operational flying training along with fleet support, trials and communications tasks.

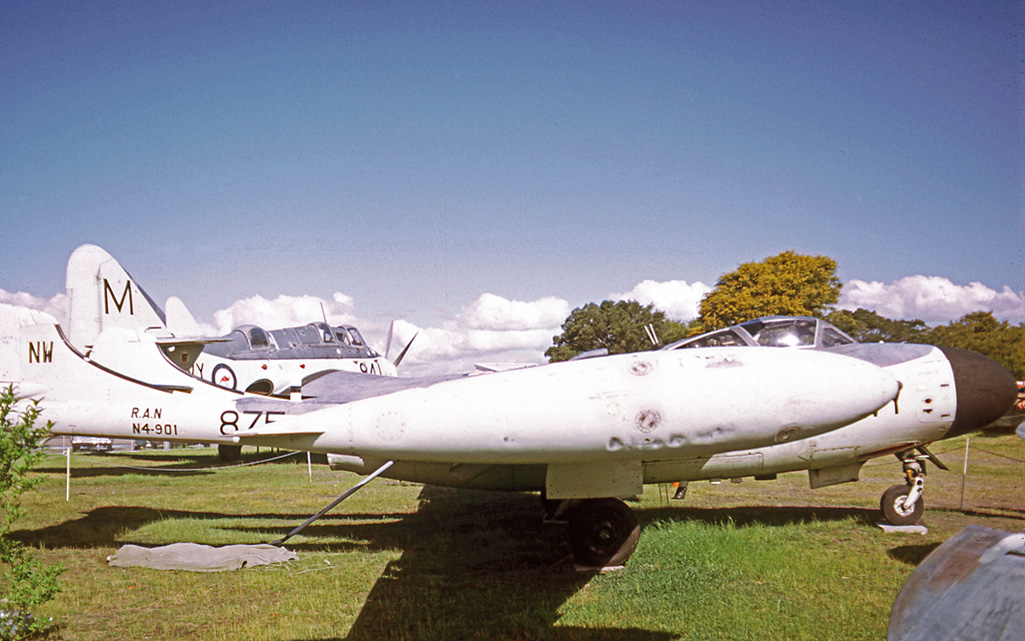
de Havilland Sea Venom FAW.53 preserved in 724 Squadron markings in an aircraft museum in Melbourne in 1973

724 Squadron became an all-jet conversion training squadron again in December 1968 and was equipped with two-seat trainer variants of the new McDonnell Douglas A-4G Skyhawk, Vampires and Venoms. The Vampires and Venoms were replaced by new Aermacchi MB-326 trainers between 1970 and 1972. Despite its rating as a second-line training unit, 724 Squadron participated in some fleet exercises and used its Skyhawks to provide close air support to Australian Army units during ground manoeuvres.

The squadron's Skyhawks were also used in a new aerobatic team called the Checkmates. In June 1982 HMAS Melbourne was decommissioned without being replaced. As a result, the RAN's fixed-wing aircraft squadrons were rapidly decommissioned. 724 Squadron absorbed 805 Squadron's Skyhawks in July 1982 and transferred its Macchis to the Royal Australian Air Force in 1983. The squadron was decommissioned at HMAS Albatross on 30 June 1984 and its Skyhawks were later sold to the Royal New Zealand Air Force.

== Aircraft operated ==
The squadron has operated a number of different aircraft types, including:

- CAC Wirraway trainer aircraft (June 1955 - October 1956)
- Fairey Firefly TT.Mk 5 target tug aircraft (June 1955 - October 1956)
- Fairey Firefly AS.Mk 6 anti-submarine aircraft (June 1955 - October 1956)
- Hawker Sea Fury FB.11 fighter-bomber (June 1955 - October 1956, May 1961 - October 1962)
- Fairey Gannet AS.1 anti-submarine aircraft (May 1955 - January 1958, May 1961 - July 1964)
- Fairey Gannet T.2 trainer aircraft (June 1955 - January 1958, May 1961 - November 1966)
- de Havilland Sea Vampire T.22 jet trainer (June 1955 - January 1972)
- de Havilland Vampire T.34A jet trainer (June 1956 - January 1966)
- de Havilland Sea Venom FAW.53 jet fighter-bomber (June 1956 - June 1972)
- Auster Autocar touring aircraft (July 1956 - October 1958)
- Bristol Sycamore Mk.50 search and rescue, and plane guard duty helicopter (October 1956 - February 1957)
- Bristol Sycamore HC.51 search and rescue, and plane guard duty helicopter (October 1956 - February 1957)
- Douglas Dakota C-47A military transport aircraft (May 1961 - September 1968)
- Fairey Firefly TT.Mk 6 target tug aircraft (November 1962 - Martch 1966)
- Macchi MB-326H jet trainer (October 1970 - June 1983)
- McDonnell Douglas A-4G Skyhawk attack and fighter jet aircraft (December 1968 - June 1984)
- McDonnell Douglas TA-4G Skyhawk two seat jet trainer (December 1968 - June 1984)

== Naval air stations ==
724 Squadron was active at a Royal Australian Navy base and it operated Flights from two Royal Australian Navy Light Fleet Carriers.

- HMAS Albatross, Naval Air Station (NAS) Nowra, New South Wales, (1 June 1955 - 30 June 1984)
  - HMAS Melbourne, Majestic-class light aircraft carrier, (Detachment two aircraft, 'H' Flight, 25 October - 13 December 1956)
  - HMAS Sydney, Majestic-class light aircraft carrier, (Detachment two aircraft, 'H' Flight, 25 October - 15 November 1956)
  - HMAS Melbourne, Majestic-class light aircraft carrier, (Detachment two aircraft, 'H' Flight, 3 January - 18 February 1957)
- disbanded - (30 June 1984)

== Commanding officers ==
List of commanding officers of 724 Squadron:

- Lieutenant Commander L.A. Robinson, RAN, from 1 June 1955
- Lieutenant Commander P.R. Dallosso, RAN, from 18 February 1957
- Lieutenant K.M. Barnett RAN, from 1 July 1957
- Lieutenant Commander A.G. Cordell, RAN, from 6 August 1957
- Lieutenant Commander C.E. Champ, RAN, from 1 August 1958
- Lieutenant Commander G.H.G. Hanchard-Goodwin, RN, from 24 November 1958
- Lieutenant Commander M.W.McD. Barron, RN, from 15 February 1959
- Lieutenant Commander G.H.G. Hanchard-Goodwin, RN, from 20 July 1959
- Lieutenant Commander I.K. Josselyn, RAN, from 9 December 1959
- Lieutenant Commander M.W.McD. Barron, RN, from 31 October 1960
- Lieutenant Commander N.E. Lee, RAN, from 3 February 1961
- Lieutenant Commander R.A. Waddell-Wood, RAN, from 4 April 1961
- Lieutenant Commander A.E. Payne, RAN, from 1 June 1961
- Lieutenant Commander J.P. Van Gelder, RAN, from 22 June 1962
- Lieutenant Commander A. Ignatieff, RAN, from 15 July 1963
- Lieutenant Commander M.J. Astbury, RAN, from 1 August 1965
- Lieutenant Commander K.A. Douglas, MBE, RAN, from 23 August 1965
- Lieutenant Commander C.M.A. Wheatley, RAN, from 4 December 1967
- Lieutenant Commander J.R. Da Costa, RAN, from 2 December 1968
- Lieutenant Commander W.E. Callan, RAN, from 28 August 1969
- Lieutenant Commander G.S. King, RAN, from 21 July 1970
- Lieutenant Commander B.A. Dutch, RAN, from 10 January 1972
- Lieutenant Commander A.M. Hickling, RAN, from 22 October 1973
- Lieutenant Commander G. Heron, RAN, from 17 January 1974
- Lieutenant Commander P.C. Marshall, AFC, RAN, from 7 July 1975
- Lieutenant Commander D. Collingridge, RAN, from 4 March 1977
- Lieutenant Commander E.M. Kavanagh, RAN, from 16 January 1978
- Lieutenant Commander C.C. Blennerhassett, RAN, from 11 December 1978
- Lieutenant Commander B.J. Daly, RAN, from 11 January 1980
- Lieutenant Commander K. Johnson, RAN, 19 December 1980
- Lieutenant Commander P.L. Clark, RAN, from 23 August 1982
- Lieutenant Commander J.M. Hamilton, AFC, RAN, from 3 December 1983
- disbanded - 30 June 1984

== Notes ==
The "Checkmates" were an aerobatic team operated by 805 Sqn (VS 805) which was the front line Skyhawk sqn. Aircraft on this team at one stage sported a chess knight logo on the tailfin instead of the red/white check pattern. (The aircraft of 724 sported a similar pattern but in blue/yellow
