= NHIndustries MRH-90 Taipan =

Australian military helicopter

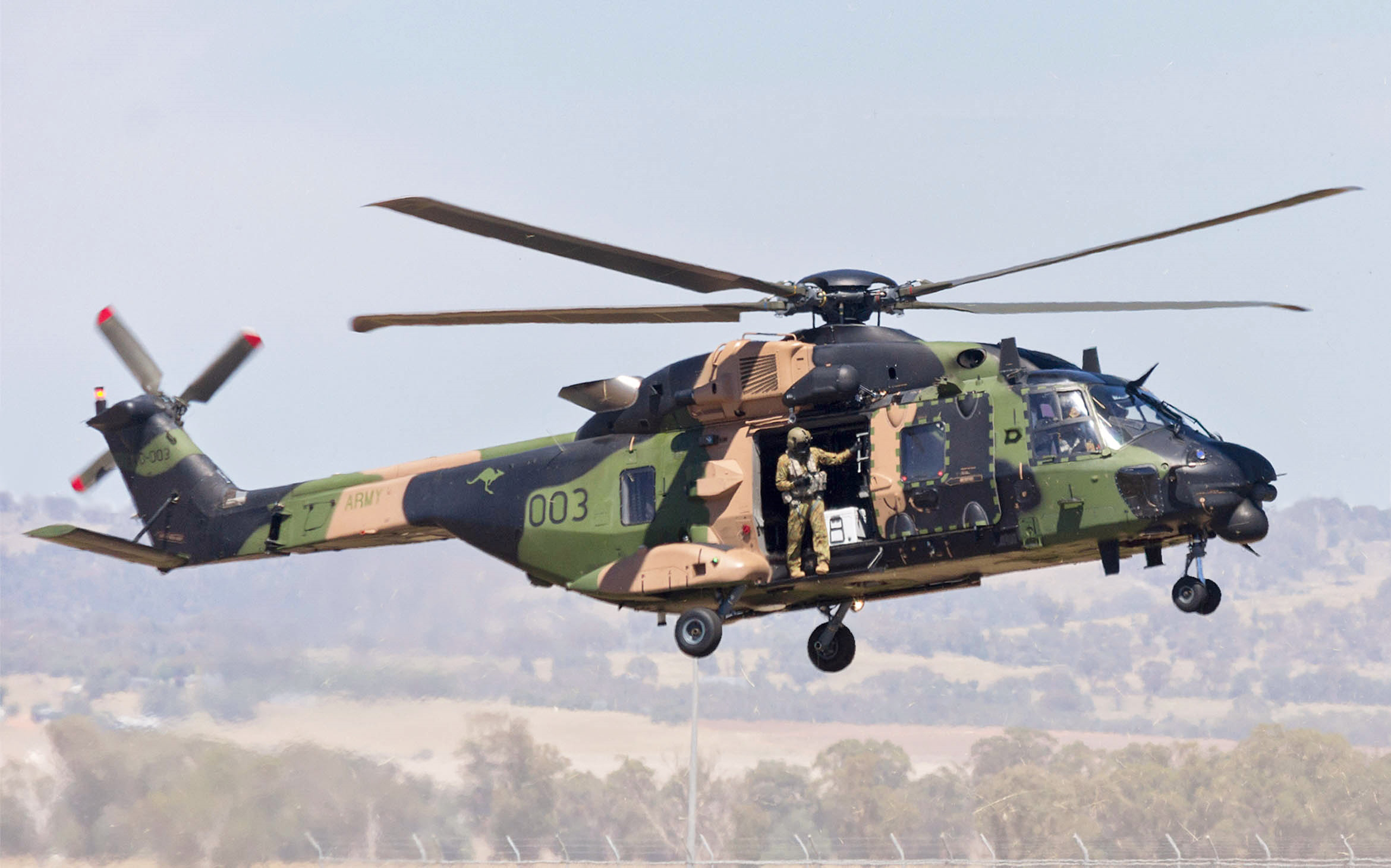
Australian Army NH90

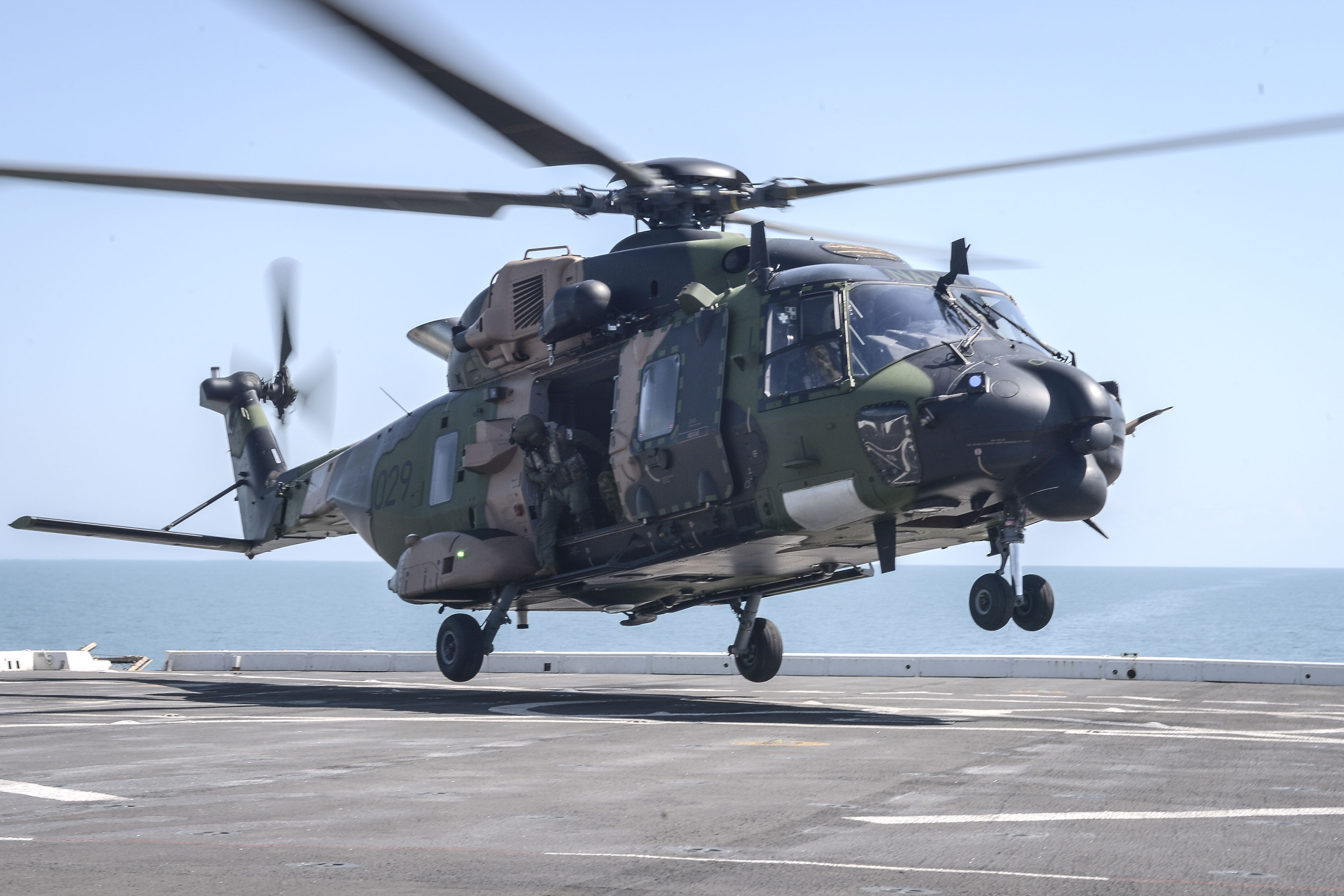
A Royal Australian Navy MRH-90 in 2015

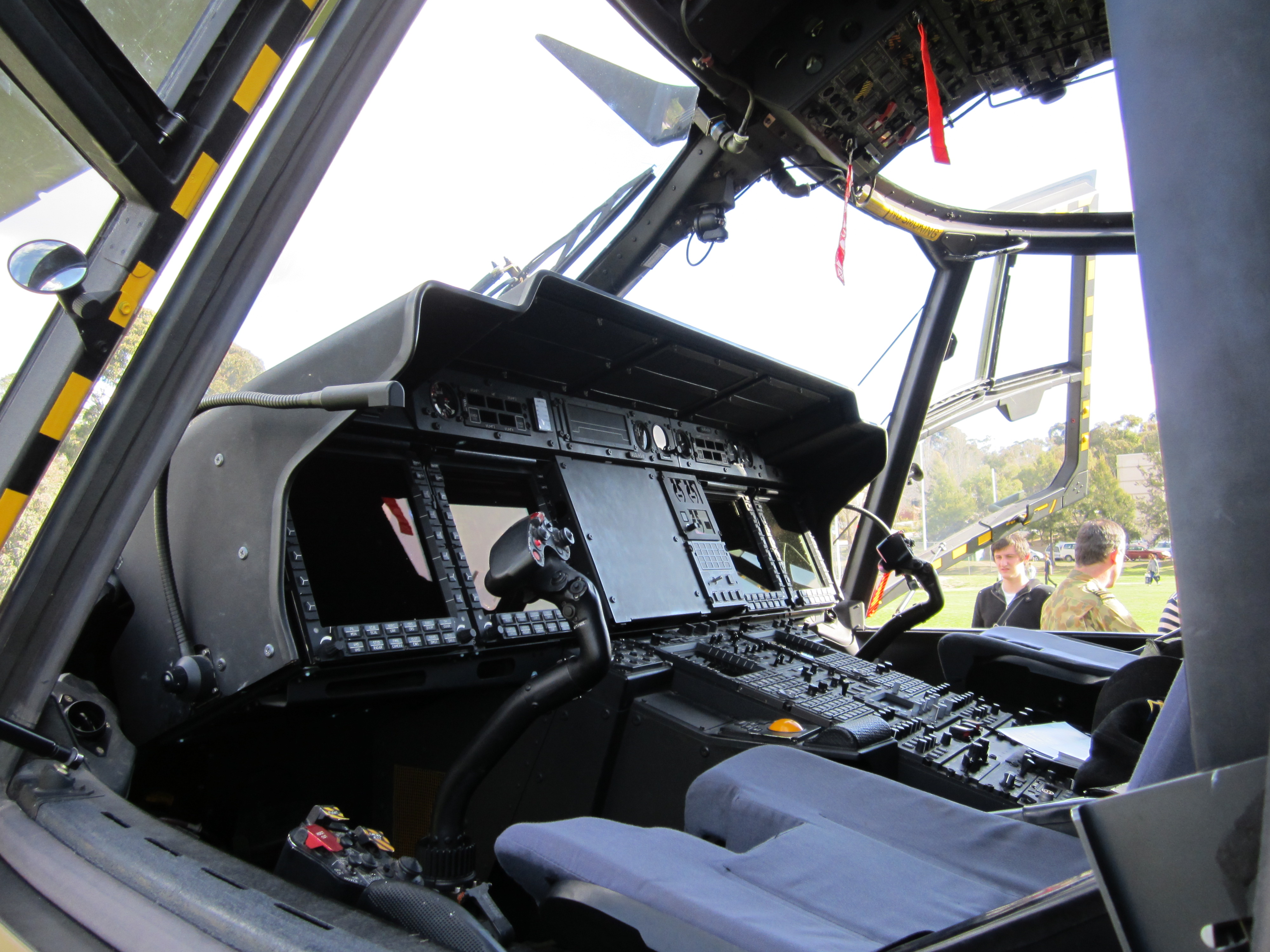
MRH-90 cockpit

The NHIndustries MRH-90 Taipan was the name of a variant of the NH90 multirole helicopter that was in service with the Australian Army and the Royal Australian Navy in the early 21st century. It entered service in December 2007, and was withdrawn from service in 2022 by the Navy and in 2023 by the Army. Most of the aircraft were assembled in Australia. The fleet was originally scheduled for retirement in 2037. After the aircraft's withdrawal, they were offered for sale then disassembled for parts which is ongoing as of 2024.

A total of 47 helicopters were acquired, primarily operated by the Army with 40 in service with 12 of those made special operations capable. High-maintenance costs and several groundings led to their retirement date being brought forward to 2024. After two accidents in 2023, including one hull loss, the Army MRH-90s were withdrawn from service a year earlier, in September 2023. The Navy operated 6 MRH-90s for support and logistics including from the Canberra-class Landing helicopter dock (LHD), which were withdrawn from service in 2022, a year earlier than the Army. With no buyers, the fleet ended up in storage with major components being sold for parts to other operators, and the airframes destined to be buried.

The MRH-90 was one of many helicopters types operated by the Australian Defence Force during this period, including various types of multi-role helicopters. The MRH-90 supplemented and eventually replaced the then in-service Sikorsky Black Hawk and Westland Sea King helicopters in the early 2000s. The MHR-90 was the primary medium helicopter for the Army in the 2010s, and was originally intended to serve longer. However, in the end was replaced by an upgraded version of the Black Hawk, the same type it had replaced.

== Design and development ==
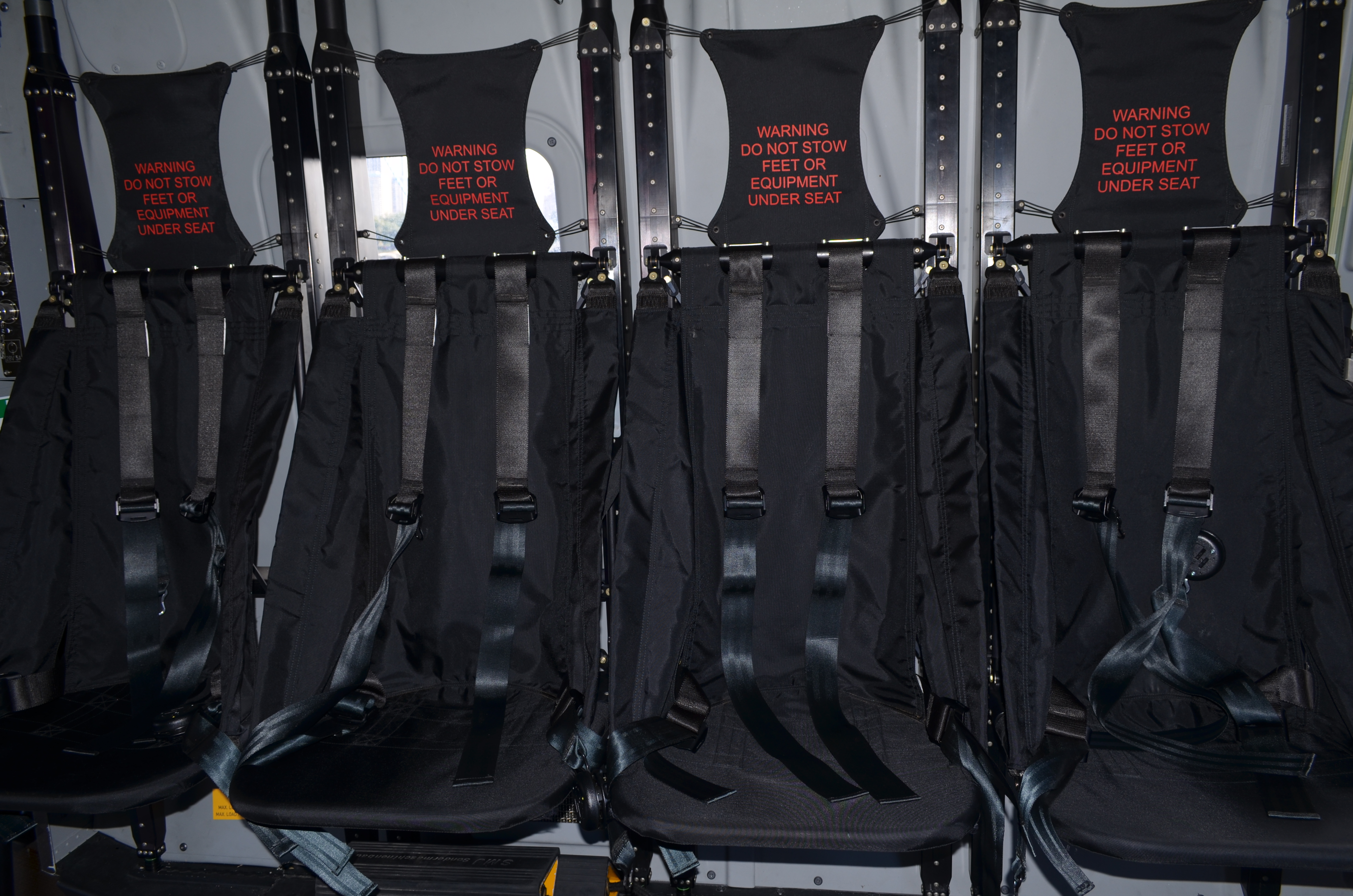
MRH-90 cabin seats

The MRH-90 Taipan was the Australian version of the NHI Industries NH90 multirole helicopter, with a roughly 10 ton maximum take off weight, composite fuselage and fly-by-wire controls, the NH90 was designed for NATO interoperability. The MRH-90 can carry two pilots and up to 20 troops, or 12 stretchers. It has weather radar, FLIR sensors, and a glass cockpit, and is powered by two Rolls-Royce Turbomeca RTM322-01/9 turbine engines producing over 1600 skw (2,230 shp). The helicopter has a retractable tricycle landing gear, two side sliding doors and a ramp at the rear. Years after introduction the design of the side doors became a subject of discussion, as they were not wide enough for certain combat situations, which led to the Army implementing "tactical workarounds" when operating with the MRH-90.

The special operations capable variant added a Fast Roping and Rappelling Extraction System (FRRES) and a gun mount for the cabin door.

=== Procurement ===
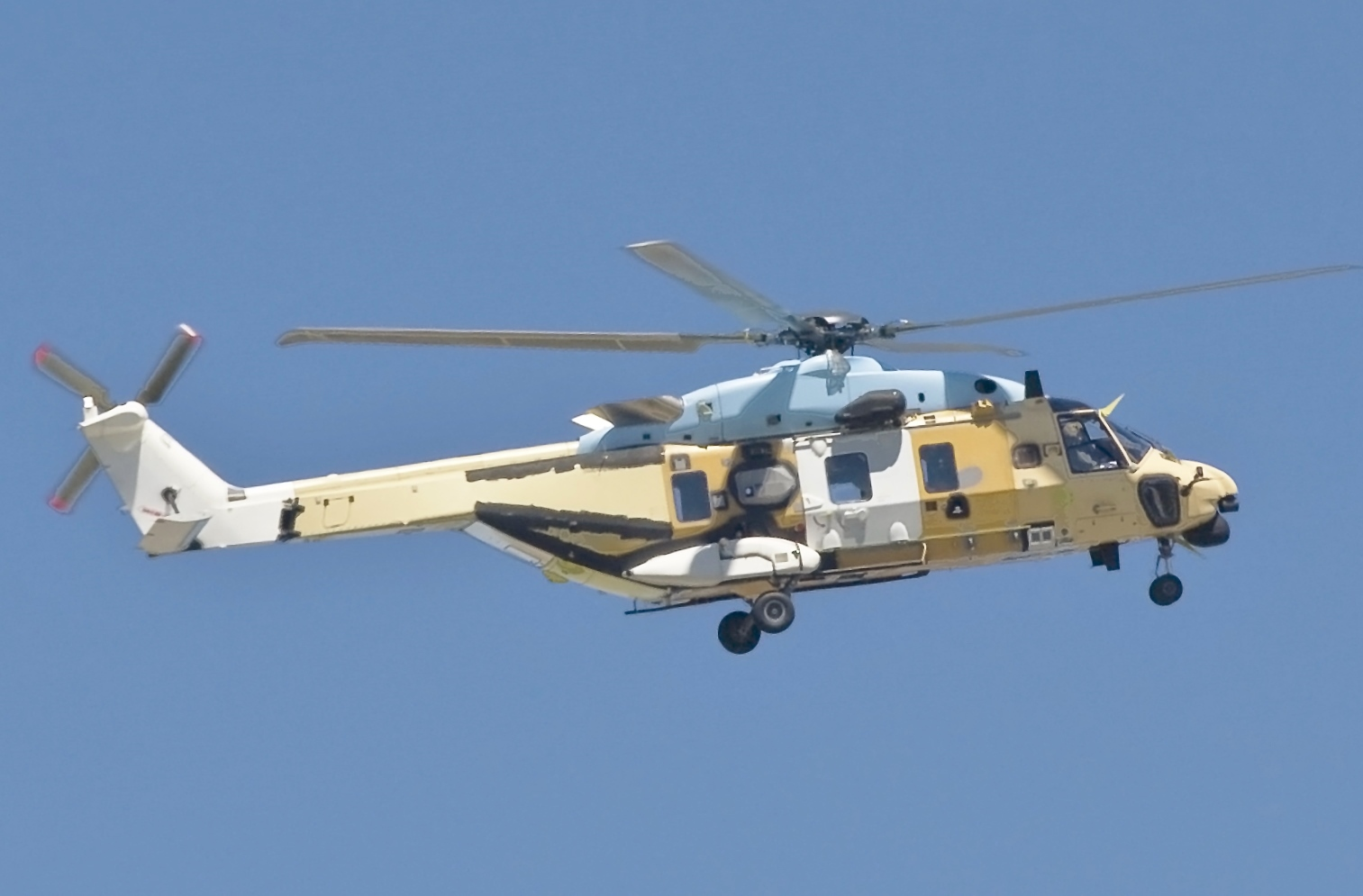
An in-production NH90 model on a test-flight over Brisbane, 2009

In 2004, Australia announced it would order 12 NH90s to supplement the Army's aging S-70A Black Hawk helicopters. In June 2006, the Australian Defence Force (ADF) announced plans to replace its S-70A-9 Black Hawk and Westland Sea King helicopters; a further 34 NH90s were ordered for a total of 46; four were manufactured in Europe while 42 being manufactured locally by Australian Aerospace (an Airbus Helicopters subsidiary) in Brisbane. Its ADF designation and name "MRH-90 Taipan" refers to its use as a "Multi Role Helicopter" and refers to a native genus of snakes. The first MRH-90 entered service in December 2007 with the Army. Six MRH-90s would be operated by 808 Squadron of the Royal Australian Navy (RAN), which was reformed in 2011 and recommissioned in 2013. Overall, there were 46 airframes in service, with a 47th kept as a spare.

The first airframe took flight in Marignane, France in March 2007, to be delivered to Australia that year. The first two were delivered in December 2007.

Out of 46, 42 of the aircraft were assembled by Australian Aerospace, which was part of Airbus Helicopters (Eurocopter before 2014). The helicopter was ordered by the Australian Department of Defence starting in 2004 to fulfil the AIR 9000 programme. Twelve were ordered in 2004 for Phase 2 of AIR 9000, and an additional 34 were ordered in 2006 in later phases. The Australian assembled aircraft were part of the Australian Industry Capability Package, which included work at facilities in Townsville, Oakey, Nowra and Holsworthy, Australia. By 2011, 15 aircraft had been delivered.

A 47th MRH-90, in addition to the 46, was added and allowed one air-frame to be used as a Ground Training Device. Overall the MRH-90 supplemented or replaced Black Hawks or Sea Kings in Australian service.

The procurement included the Australian Industry Capability Package, which included final construction facilities in Australia, at facilities in Townsville, Oakey, Nowra and Holsworthy, Australia.

== Operational history ==
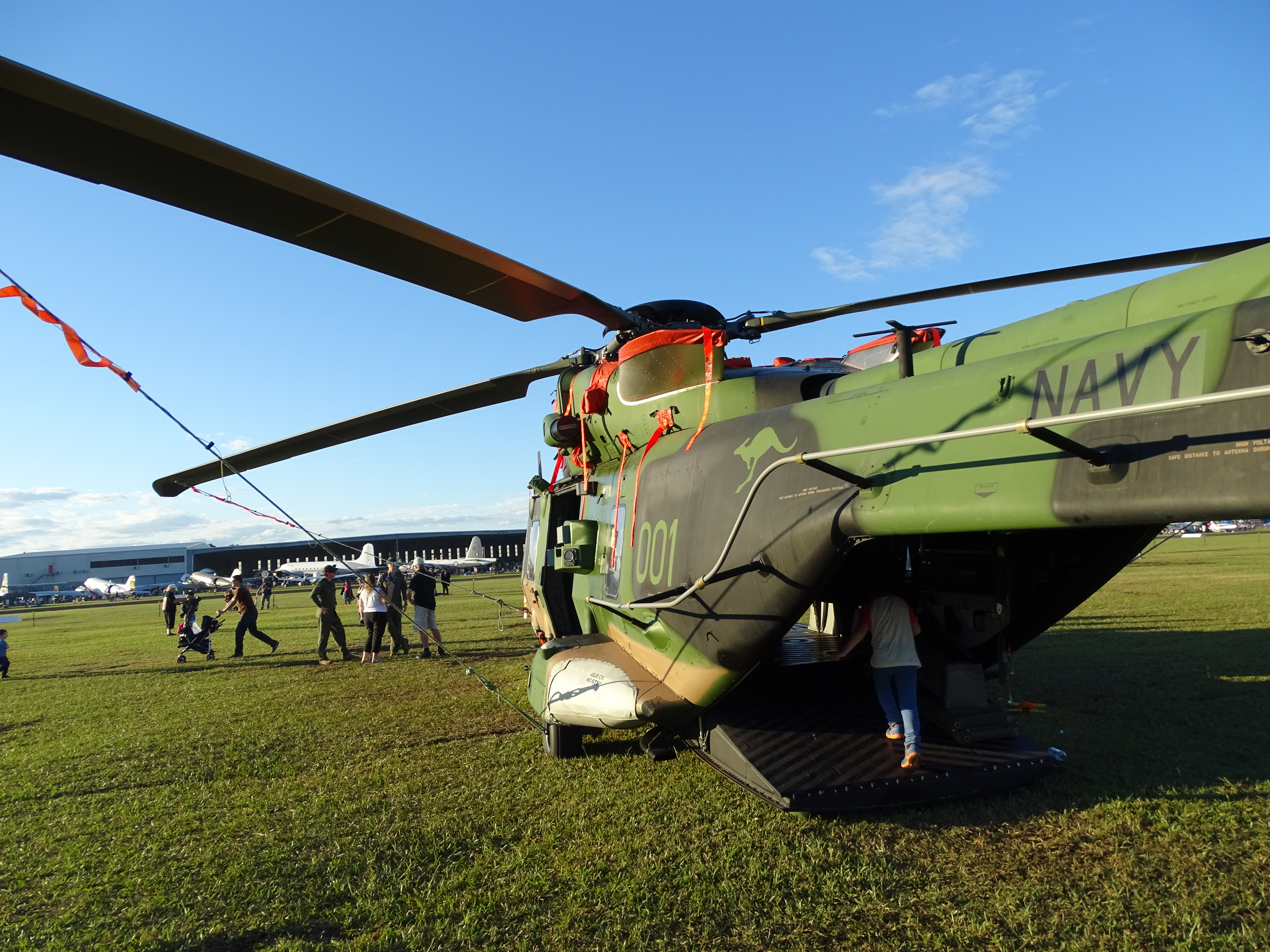
Rear ramp open, 2016

On 20 April 2010, a MRH-90 suffered a single engine failure near Adelaide, landing safely at RAAF Base Edinburgh, with NHIndustries personnel investigating the cause. On 18 May, the ADF announced that the MRH-90 fleet was grounded due to engine issues since the April incident. All MRH-90s used the Rolls-Royce Turbomeca RTM322. The cause of the failure was determined to be the compressor blade contacting the engine casing, leading to new preventative inspections; flights resumed in July 2010. In June 2011, the NFH variant lost to the Sikorsky MH-60R in competition to replace the RAN S-70B Seahawk.

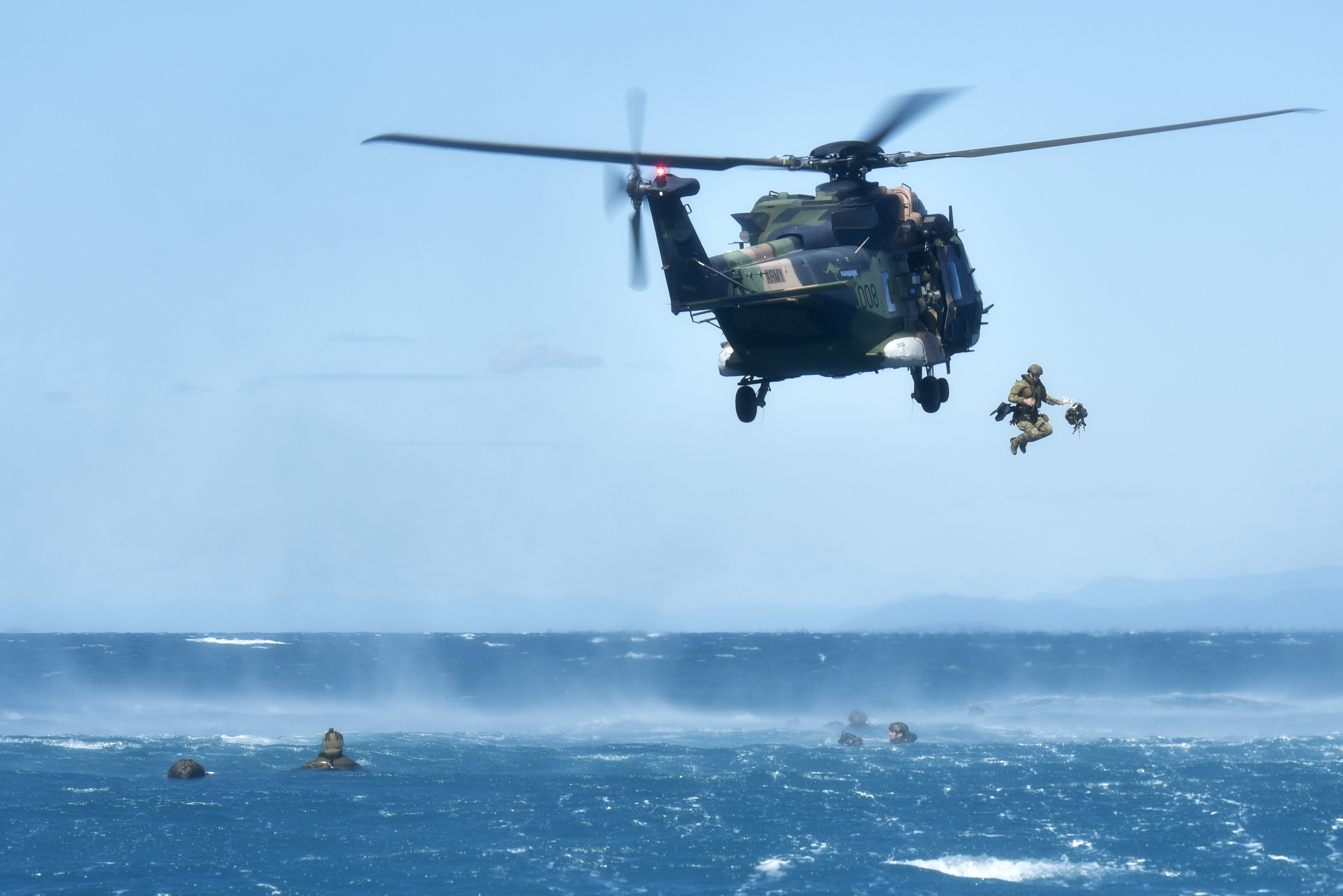
Australian soldiers helocast from a MRH-90 on a training exercise in 2018

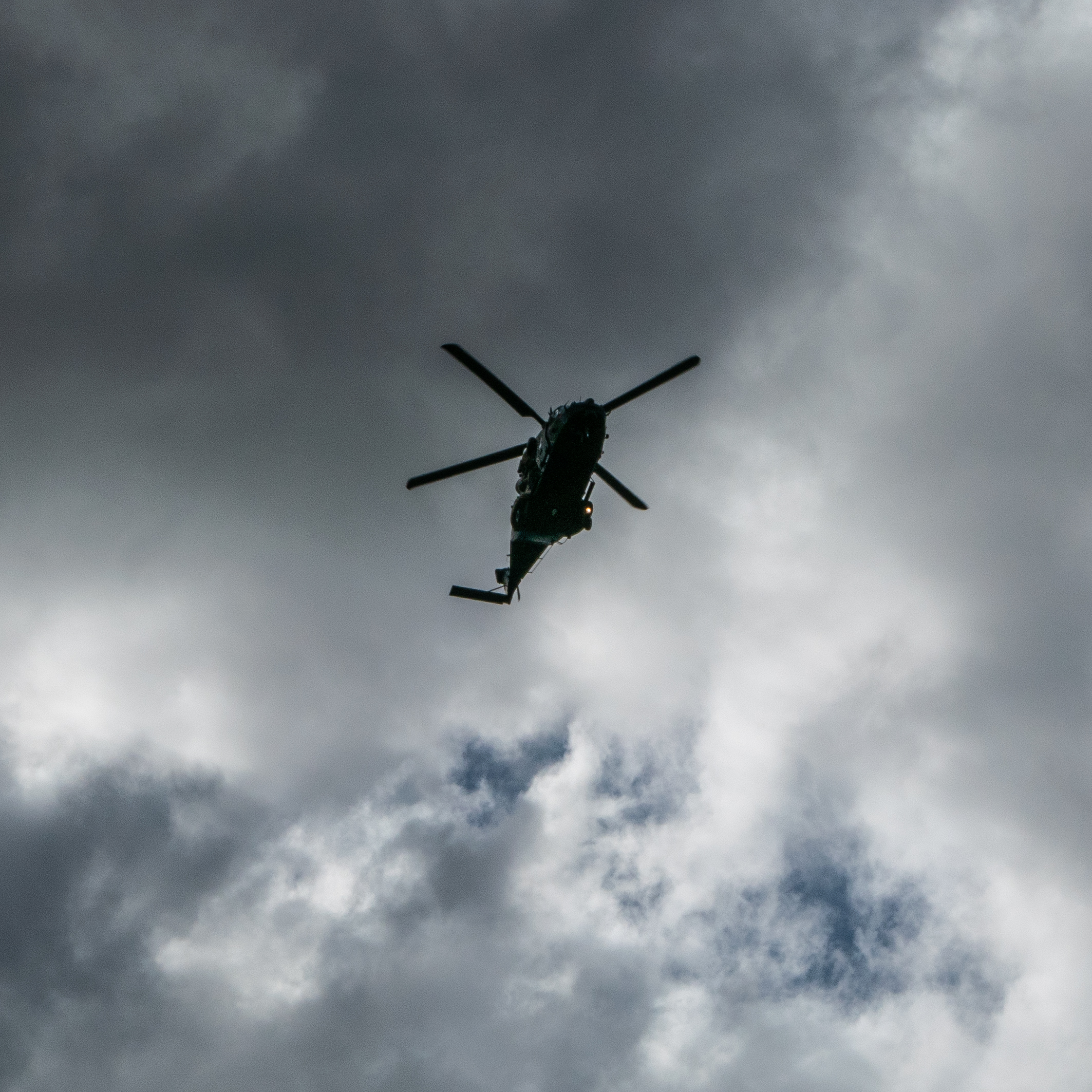
Taipan in flight at ANZAC Day 2017

In July 2014, the Australian National Audit Office released a report on the MRH-90, citing procurement errors and development deficiencies delaying final operational capability (FOC), originally set for that month, until April 2019, nearly five years later than planned. NH90s first delivered in 2007 had not yet validated any of the 11 set operational capability milestones, and forced redesigns included bolstered cabin floors and windscreens, rappelling hooks, and door gunner positions; obtaining spare parts and fleet sustainment had also been more costly. The Australian Army was forced to operate its aging S-70A Black Hawks beyond its planned retirement date. Due to the delays, Australia received an additional helicopter for a total of 47. By September 2015, most flaws had reportedly been addressed. In June 2017, the RAN successfully completed trials aboard HMAS Anzac.

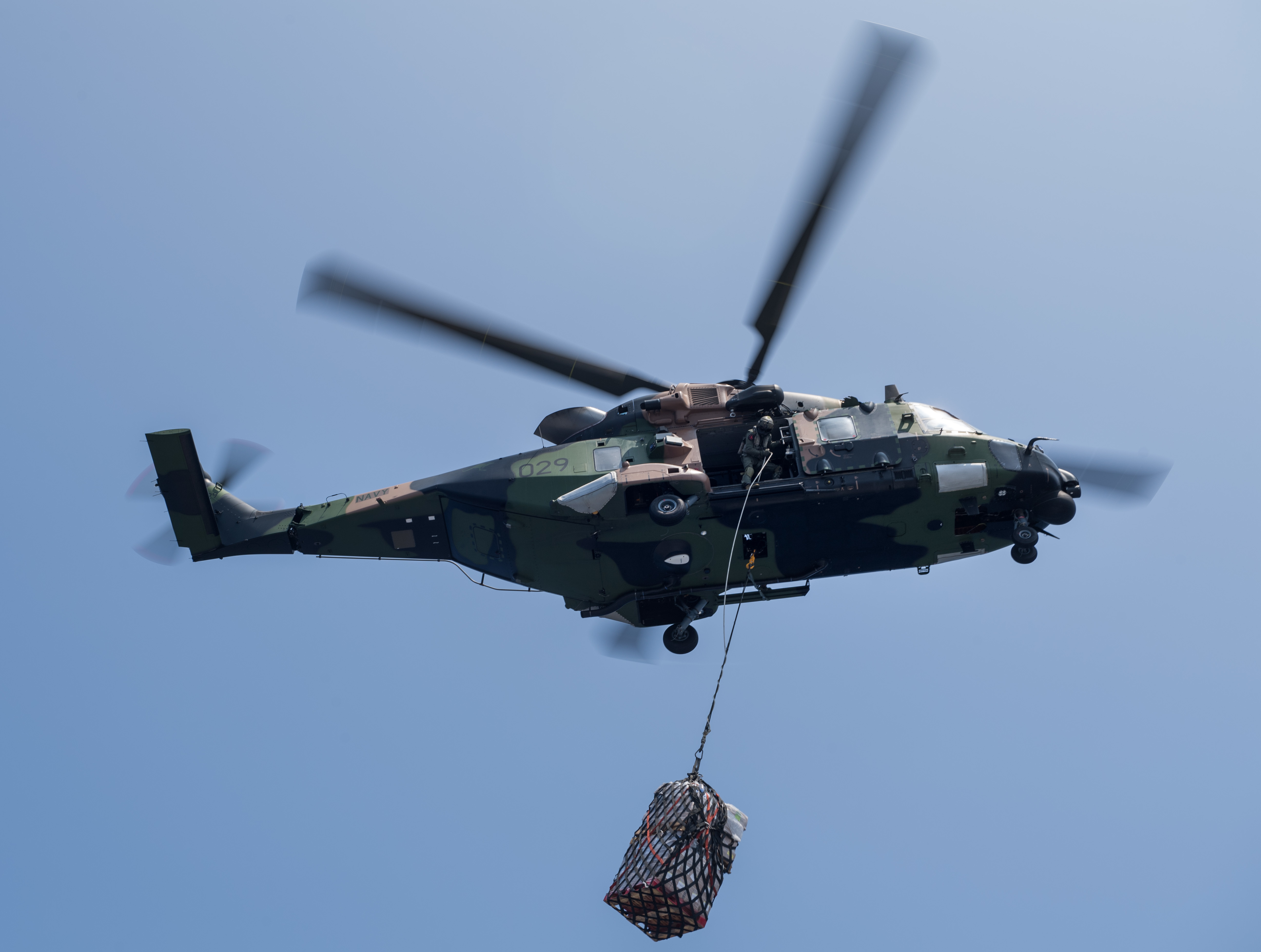
MRH-90 with supplies for RIMPAC 2018

In 2015, the Australian Army decided to delay retiring 20 older Black Hawks by four years until the end of 2021 in order to develop a special operations capable MRH-90. This required developing a Fast Roping and Rappelling Extraction System (FRRES) and a gun mount for the cabin door. The Taipan Gun Mount could fit either a M134D minigun or MAG 58 machine gun and when not in use, could be moved into an outward stowed position to provide clearance to enable fast roping and rappelling. The weapons could not be fired while a soldier exited the aircraft as the door was not wide enough requiring the Army to implement "tactical workarounds" when operating the MRH-90. In February 2019, the first two of 12 MRH-90s for special operations were delivered to 6th Aviation Regiment.

In June 2021, all MRH-90s were temporarily grounded due to lack of maintenance and spare parts which had to be shipped from Europe. Australia filled service gaps created by the groundings, operational pauses, and early retirement by extending the older S-70A's service life, by buying additional Chinook helicopters as a stop gap, leasing six AW139, as well as the urgent procurement of a replacement helicopter.

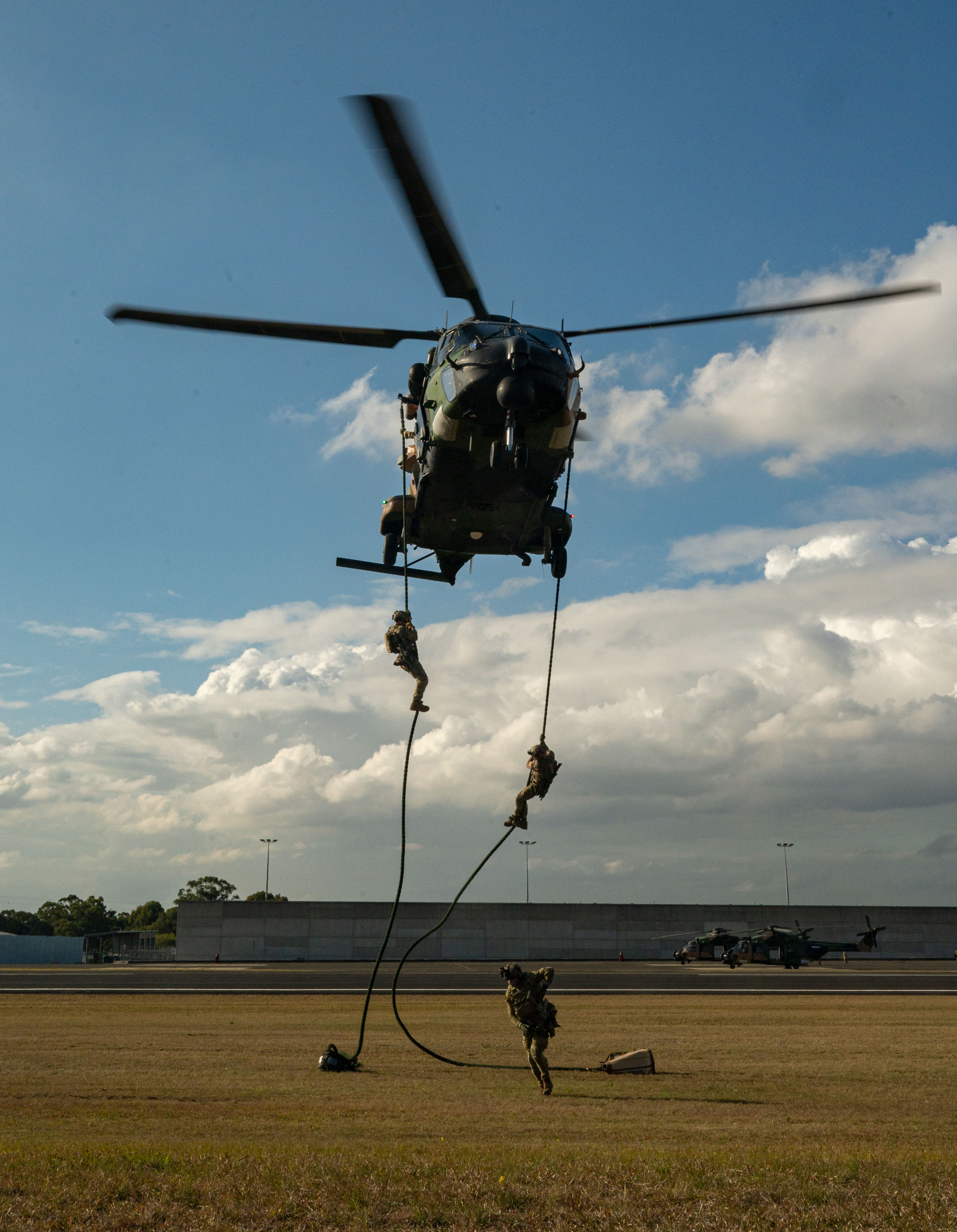
Commandos practice fast rope out of a MRH-90 during Talisman Sabre in July 2023.

In 2023 there were two incidents that led to groundings, one with loss of life. In March 2023 an Australian MRH-90 with ten personnel aboard experienced an engine failure and ditched in waters of Jervis Bay with everyone surviving. The helicopter's flotation system was deployed, allowing it to float, where it was towed onto a nearby beach. Following the incident, all MRH-90s were grounded pending an investigation. Early indications pointed to a missing flight software update. The MRH-90 returned to service on 6 April 2023. It was later reported the Jervis Bay ditch was caused by a turbine blade failure in the engine, however this was related to a known engine and maintenance issue identified ten years prior part of more complicated overall situation with the flight software and maintenance.

In July 2023, an Australian MRH-90 crashed at night during Exercise Talisman Sabre off the coast of Hamilton Island, Queensland, with the loss of its four crew. By early August, the cockpit and human remains were recovered in the debris field in 40 meters of water, consistent with a catastrophic impact. On 8 August 2023, divers recovered the flight data recorder. It was determined there was not a link between the Jervis bay incident and the Talisman Sabre crash, which was ruled out by late 2023, however the investigation was ongoing into many factors such as weather, route, and other helicopter systems.

=== Retirement and replacements ===
The MRH-90 was originally scheduled to be retired in 2037. In December 2021, on the same day the older generation of S-70 Black Hawks were retired, the Australian Government announced plans to replace the Army's MRH-90 fleet with new UH-60M Black Hawks; their retirement date was moved to 2024. In April 2022, the RAN ceased flying their MRH-90s and stored them. In May 2022, the government announced that the RAN's six MRH-90s would be replaced with more MH-60R Seahawks; it already operated 24 Seahawks, delivered between 2013 and 2016, alongside the MRH-90. In August 2022, Australia approved the purchase of 40 UH-60M Blackhawks to replace the MRH-90.

On 29 September 2023, the Australian Government announced that the MRH-90 would not return to ADF service, bringing forward the previously planned retirement date from December 2024. Officials stated the early retirement was not meant to suggest the outcome of the crash investigation, which was still ongoing; with the fleet having been grounded since the July 2023 crash. At the time of its grounding, there were 38 MRH-90s in service. The ADF invested about $3.5 billion over two decades in the program.

In February 2024, the Australian Government announced that it would lease five H135 Juno from the United Kingdom Ministry of Defence for five years, to support "essential training requirements" for Army pilots. The helicopters may also be used for personnel or equipment transport in a civil emergency.

At the time of the retirement the NH90 was in service with a dozen nations and was noted for some serviceability issues with Norway also withdrawing the helicopter from service.

=== Aftermath ===
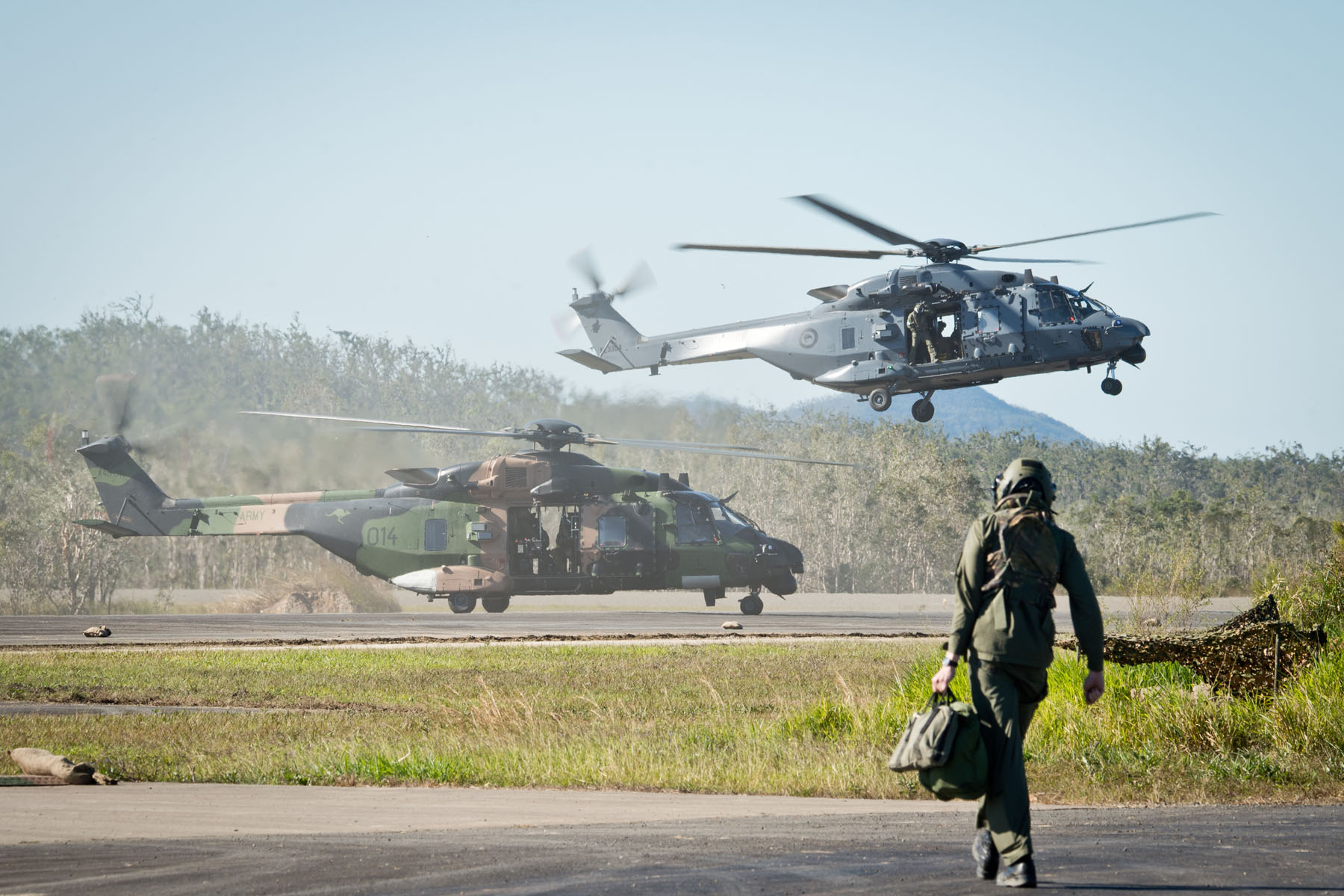
There was a purchase inquiry from New Zealand which operates the same type. A RNZAF and Australian shown here in 2015

The Department of Defence offered the MRH-90s for sale to other NH90 operators after they were retired from service. No sales eventuated with work to dismantle helicopters for spare parts commencing in late 2023. New Zealand was the only country who expressed interest in buying entire helicopters rather than just parts, but a deal was not worked out. The Australian government then decided to dismantle the fleet for key spare parts, including the engine, avionics and other subsystems, which will be removed from the airframes and offered to other NH90 operators, while country specific upgrades will be buried with the airframe.

Ukraine officially requested Australia's MRH-90s for use in the Russo-Ukrainian War but was denied as none were reportedly flightworthy at the time and the disassembly of the airframes had already commenced. The Department of Defence said that it would not be feasible to return the aircraft to a fully operational state. In addition, there were concerns over providing helicopters marred by troubles if they were reassembled. On the other hand, Ukraine stated that they are less concerned about the issues, because in a combat zone the risk profile is completely different. However, because of timing, the helicopters were already being stripped of parts, to be prepared for burial, as was done with Australia's F-111s, as of early 2024 most of the airframes are stored partially disassembled in a warehouse in Australia. The disposal plan that was developed, did not include transfer to other operators, as no buyers could be found, with the Minister for Defence stating that the request for the helicopters had come too late, and it was not considered feasible to reassemble the airframes; although public discourse on the retirement has been ongoing. As of early 2024, reports indicate that 45 of the 47 airframes (1 spare airframe and 1 airframe lost in Talisman Sabre accident) will be decommissioned and buried.

One year after fatal July 2023 crash, the Australian investigation is still ongoing, without clear answers as to why the crash occurred. One independent investigation into the fatal crash found that in 2022, one test pilot broke the chain of command as he was so concerned about perceived safety issues.

A year after the crash, the ADF held a memorial service in honour of those that died in the crash.

== Specifications (MRH-90 Taipan) ==

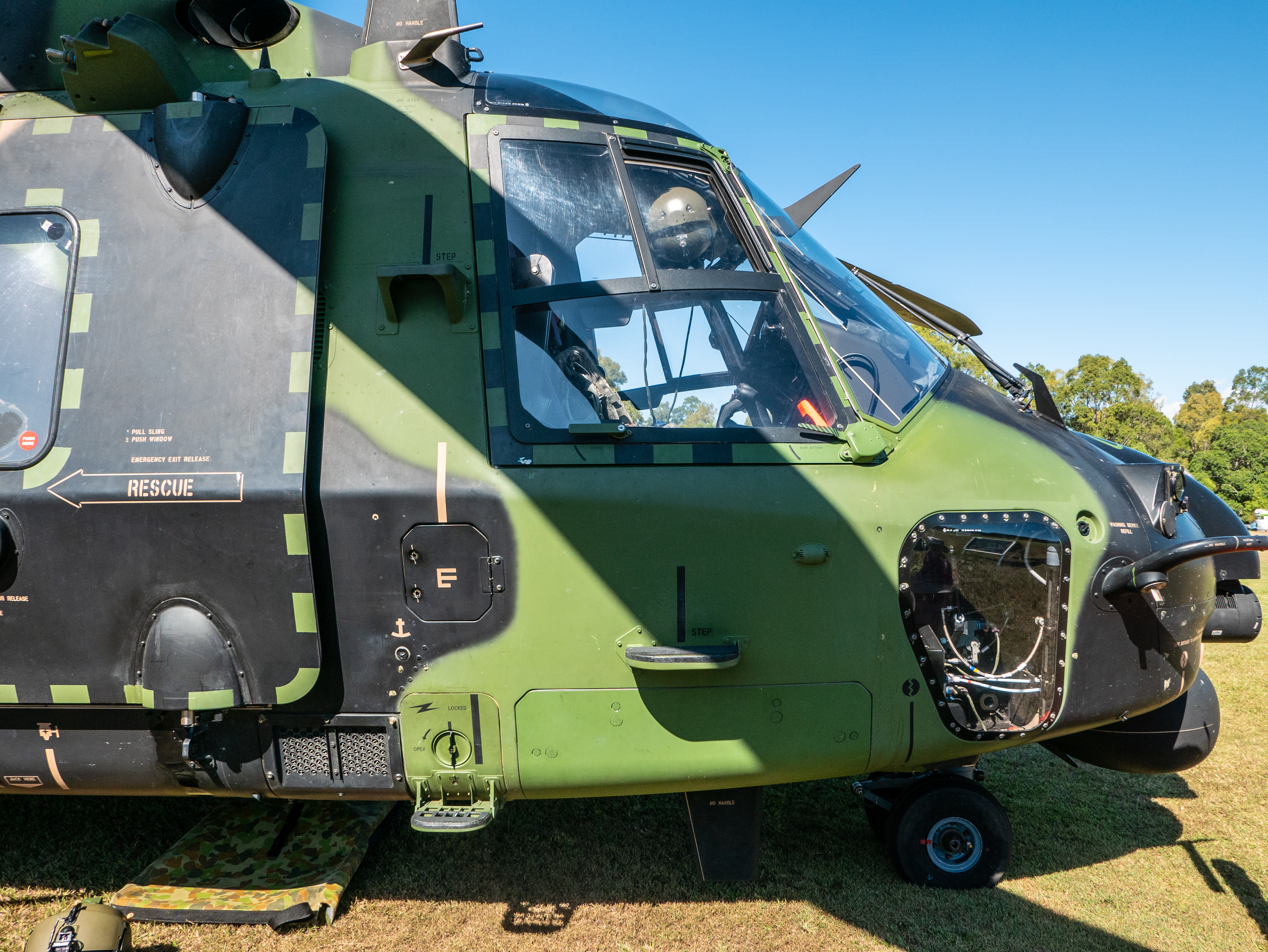
MRH-90 on display at Chermside for ANZAC Day 2016

Data from AgustaWestland, Airbus Helicopters The International Directory of Military Aircraft, 2002/2003

General characteristics

- Crew: 2 flight crew + loadmaster
- Capacity: 20 seated troops; or 12 medevac stretchers; or 2 NATO pallets; or 4,200 kg (9,259 lb) external slung load
- Length: 16.13 m (52 ft 11 in)
- Empty weight: 6,400 kg (14,110 lb)
- Max takeoff weight: 10,600 kg (23,369 lb)
- Powerplant: 2 × Rolls-Royce Turbomeca RTM322-1/9 turboshaft engines, 1,802 kW (2,417 hp) each (option)
- Main rotor diameter: 16.3 m (53 ft 6 in)
- Main rotor area: 208.699 m^{2} (2,246.42 sq ft) root: ONERA OA312; tip: ONERA OA409/OA407

Performance

- Maximum speed: 300 km/h (190 mph, 160 kn)
- Range: 800 km (500 mi, 430 nmi) TTH
- Endurance: 5 hours
- Service ceiling: 6,000 m (20,000 ft)
- Rate of climb: 8 m/s (1,600 ft/min)

Armament

- Guns: door guns (M134 Minigun or MAG 58)

== See also ==
- List of Australian Army aircraft
- List of aircraft of the Royal Australian Navy
