= Auster Autocar =

1940s British light aircraft

J/5 Autocar
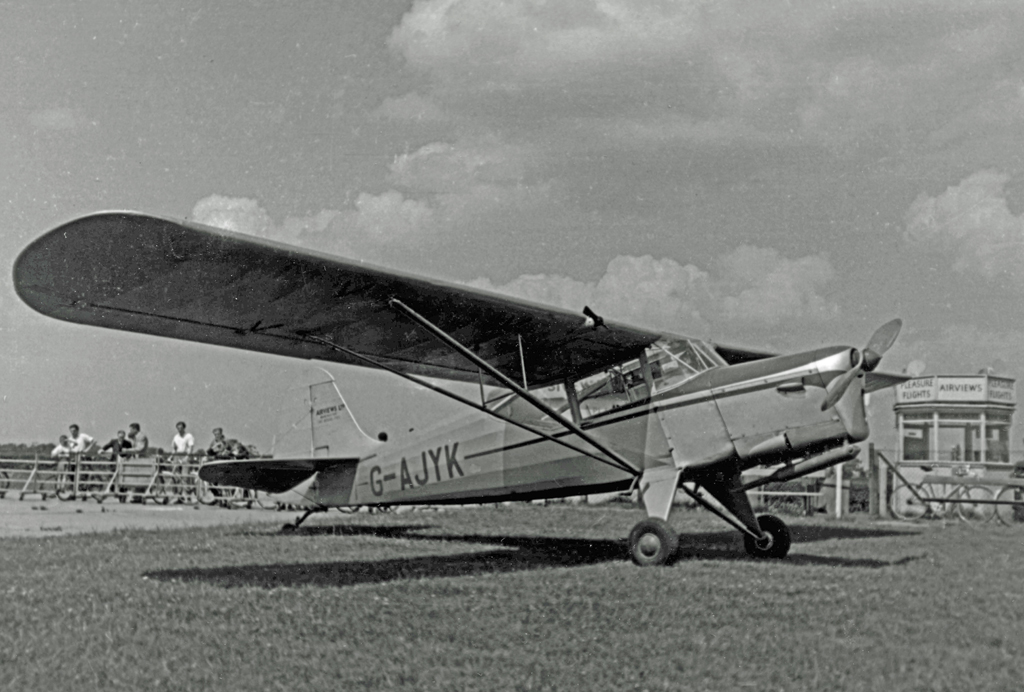
- The prototype J/5B Autocar of Airviews Ltd at Manchester Airport in 1950

General information
- Type: Touring aircraft
- Manufacturer: Auster Aircraft Limited
- Status: Several still airworthy in 2012
- Primary user: Private pilot owners
- Number built: 202

History
- Manufactured: 1950-1957
- Introduction date: 1950
- First flight: August 1949
- Variant: J/5 Aiglet Trainer

The Auster J/5 Autocar is a late 1940s British single-engined four-seat high-wing touring monoplane built by Auster Aircraft Limited at Rearsby, Leicestershire.

== Design and production ==
The company recognised a need for a four-seat touring aircraft to complement the three-seat Auster J/1 Autocrat. The J/5 Autocar looked similar to the Autocrat, but was a new model featuring wing-root fuel tanks and an enlarged cabin.

The designation of J/5 for the Autocar followed on from its progenitor, the wartime Model J, which was designated the Auster AOP.V by the Royal Air Force. Postwar models derived from the Model J commenced with the J/1 Autocrat - note the use of J/1, not J-1.

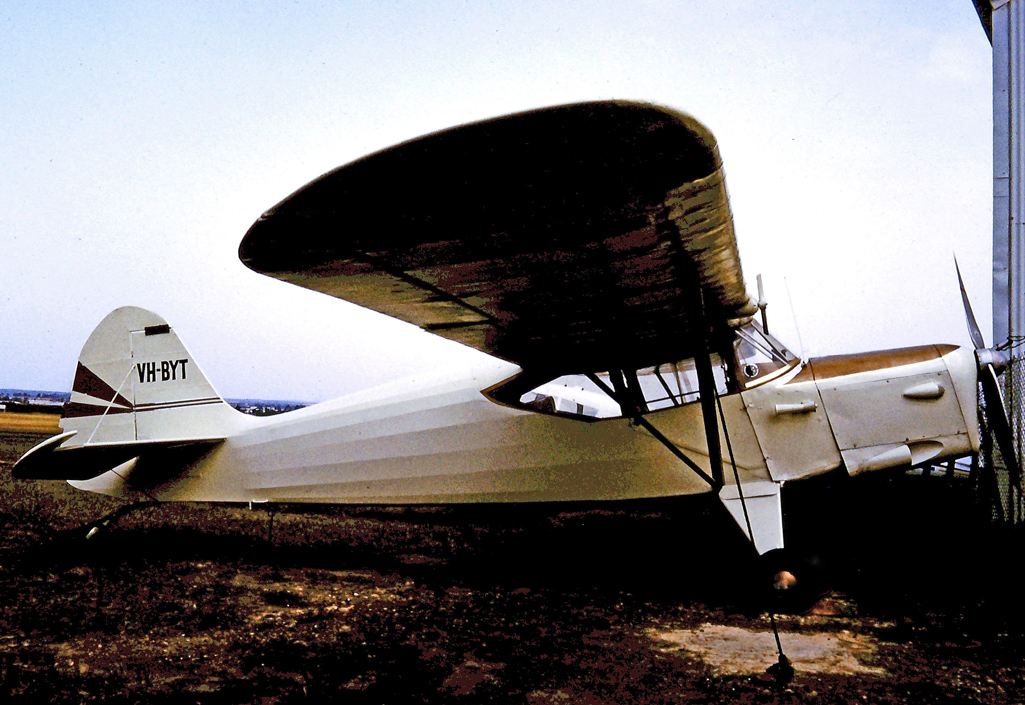
Auster J/5G Autocar at Sydney (Bankstown) Airport in 1970

The prototype Autocar G-AJYK, a model J/5B, first flew in August 1949 and was exhibited at the Farnborough Air Show in September. A demand for a more powerful version for the tropics produced in 1950 the J/5E powered by a 155 hp (116 kW) Blackburn Cirrus Major engine. This was further developed as the J/5G which was first flown in 1951 and is also referred to as the Cirrus Autocar. The later J/5P reverted to a more powerful de Havilland Gipsy Major engine. Other variants were built as one-off development aircraft, and some were converted in Australia with more modern engines.

== Operations ==
Saunders-Roe of Cowes, Isle of Wight, acquired a J/5G Autocar and fitted it with an experimental hydro-ski undercarriage and emergency under-wing floats. With this equipment, the aircraft could remain almost stationary on the water.

The majority of the production Autocars were exported to sixteen countries and later resold in five further territories. The Autocar has been primarily operated by private pilot owners and by aero clubs but some were used by small charter firms in the UK and elsewhere as taxi and photographic aircraft. Pest Control Ltd took delivery of five J/5G Autocars in 1952 for crop spraying operations in Sudan.

== Variants ==
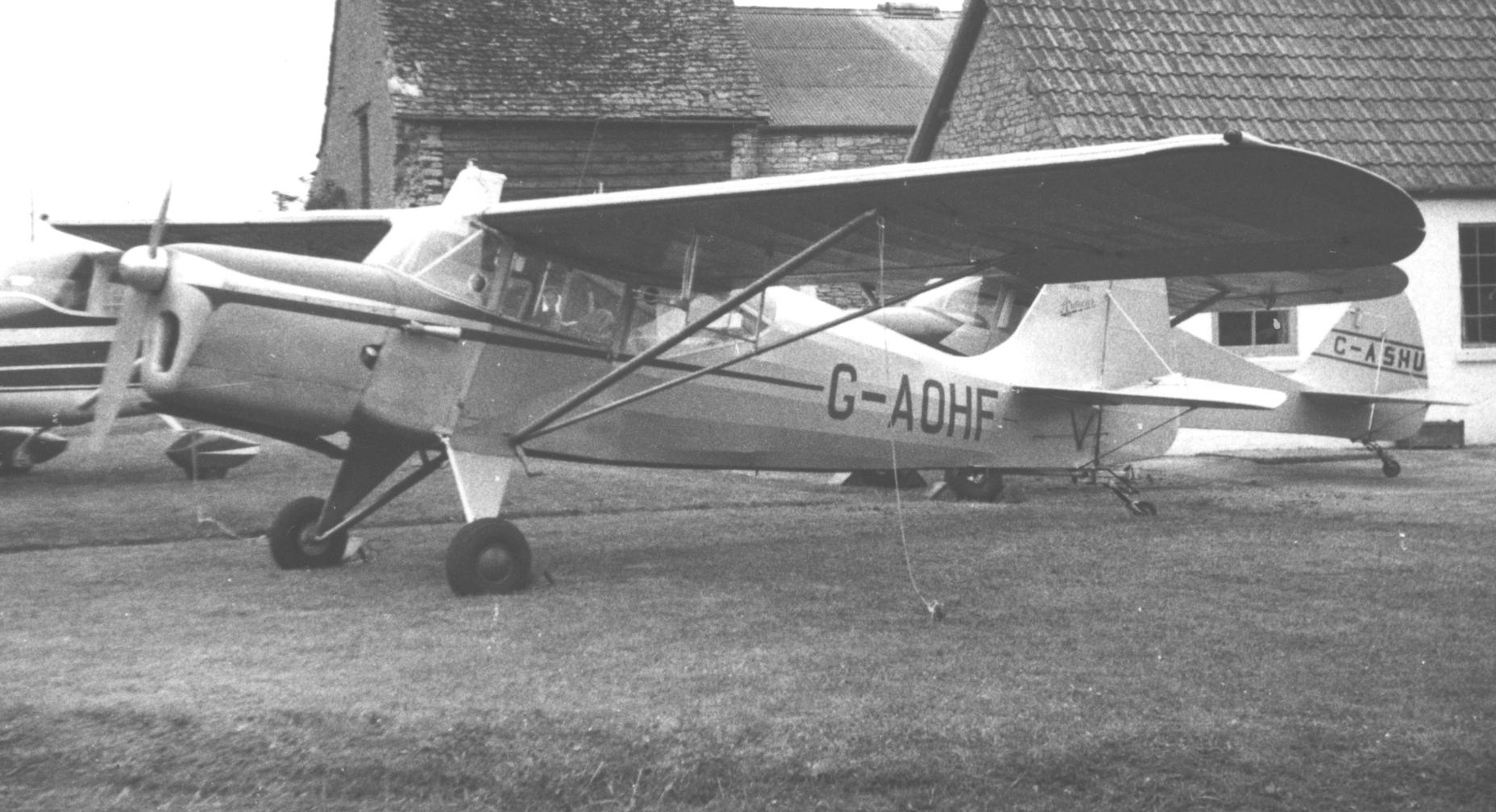
J/5P Autocar at Kidlington Airport, Oxford in 1966

Auster J/5B Autocar
production version with a 130 hp (97 kW) de Havilland Gipsy Major 1 engine.
Auster J/5E Autocar
prototype export version with a Blackburn Cirrus Major 3 engine, one built (G-AJYS).
Auster J/5G Autocar
export version with a 155 hp Blackburn Cirrus Major 3 engine.
Auster J/5GL
one Auster J/5G converted in Australia by Kingsford Smith Aviation Services (ZK-CXA, a rebuild of ZK-BDK) fitted with a Lycoming piston engine.
Auster J/5G Super Autocar
One J/5G converted in Australia by Kingsford Smith Aviation Services with a 225 hp (168 kW) Continental O-470 engine.
Auster J/5H Autocar
with 145 hp (108 kW) Blackburn Cirrus Major 2 engine, one rebuilt (VH-KCO) in Australia by Kingsford Smith Aviation Services from J/5B
Auster J/5P Autocar
version with a 145 hp (108 kW)de Havilland Gipsy Major 10 engine.
Auster J/5T Autocar
development aircraft with 185 hp (138 kW) Continental E-185-10 piston engine, one built (G-25-4, c/n 3421)
Auster J/5V Autocar
development aircraft with 160 hp (120 kW) Lycoming O-320 engine, one built (G-APUW)

Kingsford Smith Bushmaster
An Auster J/5G conversion in Australia by Kingsford Smith Aviation Services, fitted with a 180hp (134kW) Lycoming O-360 engine, constant speed propeller and other improvements.

== Civil operators ==
United Kingdom

- Airviews Ltd
- Anglian Air Charter
- Bees Flight
- Bristol Aero Engines
- Dunlop Rubber
- Ferranti
- Gloster Aircraft
- Hunting Aerosurveys Ltd
- Pest Control Ltd
- Saunders-Roe
- Southend Flying School

Pakistan

Auster J/5G Cirrus Autocar, registered in Pakistan as AP-AHJ for Government of Pakistan, Department of Plant Protection. Preserved in PAF Museum.

== Military operators ==
Australia

- Royal Australian Navy
  - 723 Squadron RAN
  - 724 Squadron RAN
  - 725 Squadron RAN

Kuwait

- Kuwait Air Force

New Zealand

- Royal New Zealand Air Force

== Specifications (J/5B) ==
Data from Jane's All The World's Aircraft 1953–54

General characteristics

- Crew: 1
- Capacity: 3 passengers
- Length: 23 ft 2 in (7.06 m)
- Wingspan: 36 ft 0 in (10.97 m)
- Height: 7 ft 7 in (2.31 m)
- Wing area: 185 sq ft (17.2 m^{2})
- Empty weight: 1,413 lb (641 kg)
- Gross weight: 2,450 lb (1,111 kg)
- Fuel capacity: 145 imp gal (174 US gal; 660 L)
- Powerplant: 1 × de Havilland Gipsy Major I air-cooled, four-cylinder inline engine, 130 hp (97 kW)

Performance

- Maximum speed: 116 mph (187 km/h, 101 kn)
- Cruise speed: 100 mph (160 km/h, 87 kn)
- Stall speed: 34 mph (55 km/h, 30 kn) Flaps down
- Range: 500 mi (800 km, 430 nmi)
- Service ceiling: 11,000 ft (3,400 m)
- Rate of climb: 525 ft/min (2.67 m/s)
- Take-off to 50 ft (15 m): 537 yd (1,611 ft; 491 m)
- Landing run: 163 yd (489 ft; 149 m)
