= 725 Squadron RAN =

Royal Australian Navy Fleet Air Arm flying squadron

725 Squadron
- 725 Squadron badge
- Active: 1958–1961; 1962–1975; 2015–present
- Country: Australia
- Branch: Royal Australian Navy
- Type: Training squadron
- Part of: Fleet Air Arm
- Garrison/HQ: HMAS Albatross
- Motto: Be aggressive
- Battle honours: Vietnam 1967

Aircraft flown
- Helicopter: MH-60R Seahawk Romeo

725 Squadron is a naval aviation squadron of the Royal Australian Navy (RAN) Fleet Air Arm. The squadron was originally created in August 1943 as part of the Fleet Air Arm of the Royal Navy. It initially served as a fleet requirements unit, was rerolled in August 1945 as a target towing unit, then was disbanded in December 1945. In January 1958, the squadron was re-formed, as a fleet requirements and communications unit of the RAN, operating a variety of fixed-wing aircraft. The squadron was redesignated as an anti-submarine warfare training squadron in May 1959, then was decommissioned in May 1961 and absorbed into 724 Squadron. 725 Squadron was recommissioned in November 1962 as an operational anti-submarine helicopter squadron, flying the Westland Wessex. During this commission, the squadron was involved in HMAS Sydney's troop transport voyages, the rescue of personnel following the Melbourne-Voyager collision, and the Operation Navy Help Darwin relief effort post-Cyclone Tracy. The squadron was decommissioned in December 1975. 725 Squadron was commissioned for the fourth time in June 2015, this time as a training unit for MH-60R Seahawk Romeo helicopters: the squadron had been reactivated two years prior as a non-commissioned unit train on and accept into service the Romeos.

== History ==
725 Squadron was formed on 27 August 1943 as a fleet requirements unit of the Royal Navy. It became an air target towing squadron in August 1945 and was disbanded in December of that year.

725 Squadron was re-formed as a Royal Australian Navy fleet requirements and communications unit at HMAS Albatross on 13 January 1958. The squadron was initially equipped with C47 Dakota, Auster Autocar, Hawker Sea Fury, Fairey Firefly and Fairey Gannet aircraft and added De Havilland Sea Venoms shortly afterwards. The squadron was redesignated an anti-submarine training squadron in May 1959, and suffered its only fatality in December of that year when a Gannet crashed while landing at HMAS Albatross. The squadron's duties during this period included providing aircraft for air direction officer training, radar calibration and target towing as well as conducting simulated attacks on RAN warships during exercises. These duties continued until 31 May 1961 when 725 Squadron was disbanded and absorbed into 724 Squadron.

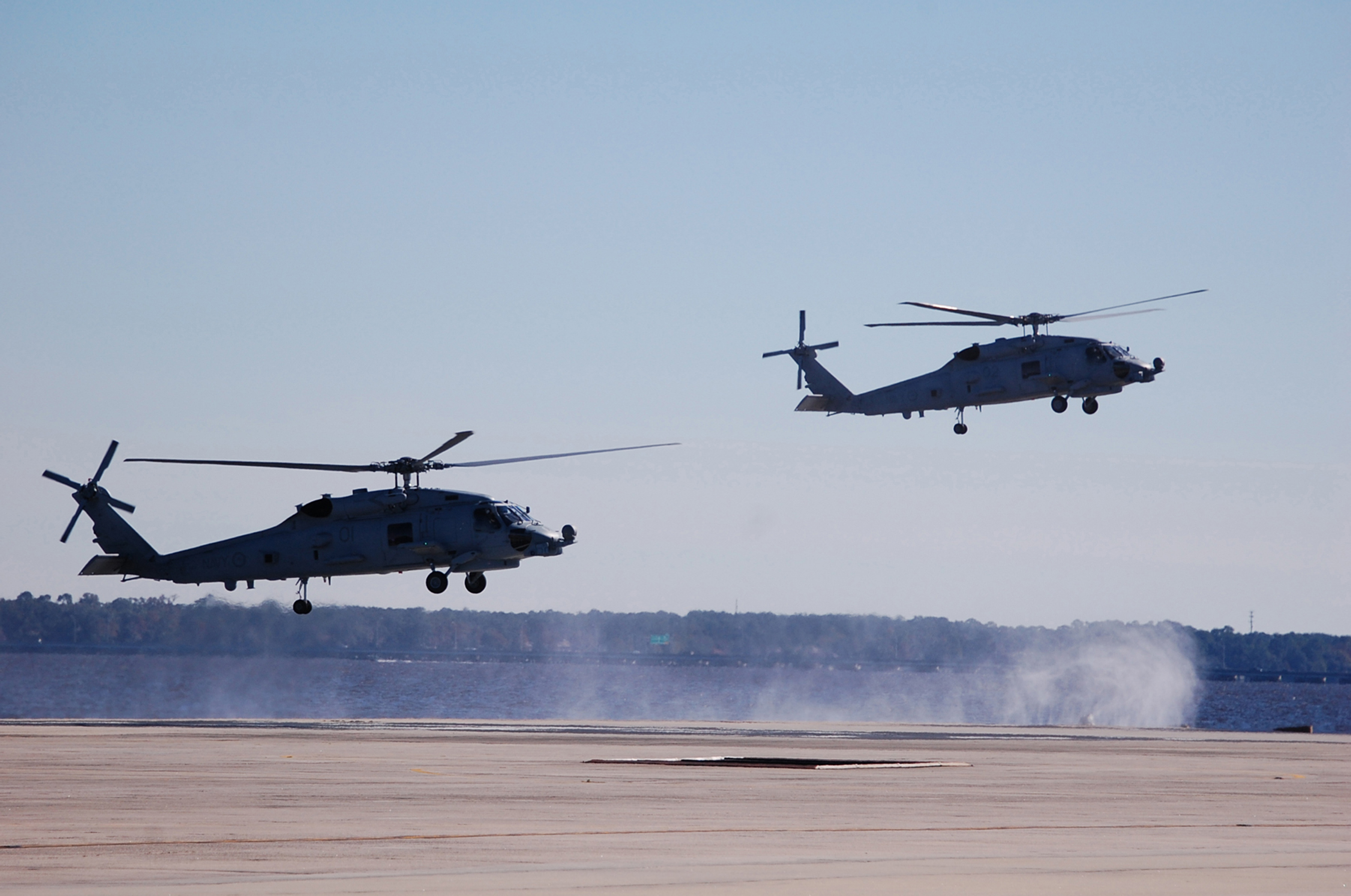
The RAN's first two MH-60Rs at NAS Jacksonville shortly before being formally delivered in December 2013

725 Squadron was reformed as an operational anti-submarine squadron equipped with Westland Wessex helicopters on 1 November 1962. In this role the squadron regularly deployed four Wessex helicopters on HMAS Sydney to provide the troop transport with anti-submarine cover during her many transport voyages to South Vietnam during the Vietnam War. The squadron also participated in the search and rescue efforts which followed the collision between HMA Ships Melbourne and Voyager in February 1964. Helicopters from the squadron also took part in Operation Navy Help Darwin, the relief effort after Cyclone Tracy destroyed much of Darwin in December 1974. 725 Squadron was disbanded at HMAS Albatross on 27 December 1975.

On 13 December 2012 the Australian Government announced that 725 Squadron will be re-raised as a training unit operating MH-60R Seahawk Romeo helicopters. In this role it will train aircrew for subsequent service with 816 Squadron. The squadron was reformed on 11 February 2013 in a non-commissioned capability, and spent the next two years based at Naval Air Station Jacksonville in Florida, while personnel were trained on the new helicopters. The first two Romeos were delivered to the squadron on 12 December 2013. In December 2014, the squadron was relocated to naval air station HMAS Albatross. 725 Squadron was recommissioned into the RAN at Albatross on 11 June 2015.

== Battle honours ==
725 Squadron was awarded the battle honour "Vietnam 1967" for its service during the Vietnam War.
