= 723 Squadron RAN =

Royal Australian Navy Fleet Air Arm flying squadron

- 723 Squadron badge
- Active: 1952–1956; 1957–present
- Country: Australia
- Branch: Royal Australian Navy
- Type: Training squadron
- Role: Helicopter Training
- Part of: Fleet Air Arm
- Home station: HMAS Albatross
- Motto: Wings of the Albatross
- Aircraft: See Aircraft operated section for full list.
- Battle honours: Vietnam 1967–1971; Kuwait 1991; East Timor 1999

Commanders
- Commanding Officer: Commander Samuel Dale

Aircraft flown
- Trainer helicopter: EC-135T2+

723 Squadron is a Royal Australian Navy Fleet Air Arm squadron. The squadron was first raised in 1952 and throughout its history has served operationally during the Vietnam War, the Gulf War and in East Timor. It currently operates as a helicopter training squadron and is based at HMAS Albatross at Nowra, New South Wales.

== History ==
The Royal Navy's original 723 Naval Air Squadron arrived at Nowra in January 1945 after travelling from the United Kingdom on the troopship Athlone Castle. The squadron "towed drogue targets [and provided] ‘attacking aircraft’ for ship and aircraft gunnery practice, radar calibration and radar interception targets." It was disbanded on May 31, 1946.

723 Squadron was first commissioned into the Royal Australian Navy (RAN) on 7 April 1952 and was equipped with one Dakota, one Wirraway, one Sea Otter and two Sea Fury aircraft.

On 11 March 1953 the Squadron took delivery of the RAN's first helicopter, a Bristol Sycamore. 723 Squadron also took delivery of the RAN's first jet aircraft, a de Havilland Vampire Mk T.34 on 18 June 1954.

During the Vietnam War, personnel from the squadron operated as part of the Experimental Military Unit, a joint Australian-American helicopter assault and transport unit. During the squadron's history, the battle honours "Vietnam 1967–71", "Kuwait 1991", and "East Timor 1999" have been earned.

== Current roles ==
723 Squadron was previously equipped with 13 Aerospatiale AS 350BA Ecureuil (Squirrel) and three Bell 429 helicopters. The Squadron is based at HMAS Albatross (NAS Nowra). The Squirrels were used for conversion training all pilots, observers and aircrew from fixed wing to rotary wing aircraft. The Bell 429 joined the Squadron in 2012 on lease from Raytheon Australia and were used for multi engine training for pilots moving onto other aircraft such as the S-70B-2 Seahawk.

It is currently active as the Australian Defence Force's helicopter training squadron operating the EC-135T2+ helicopter at the Joint Helicopter School.

== Aircraft operated ==
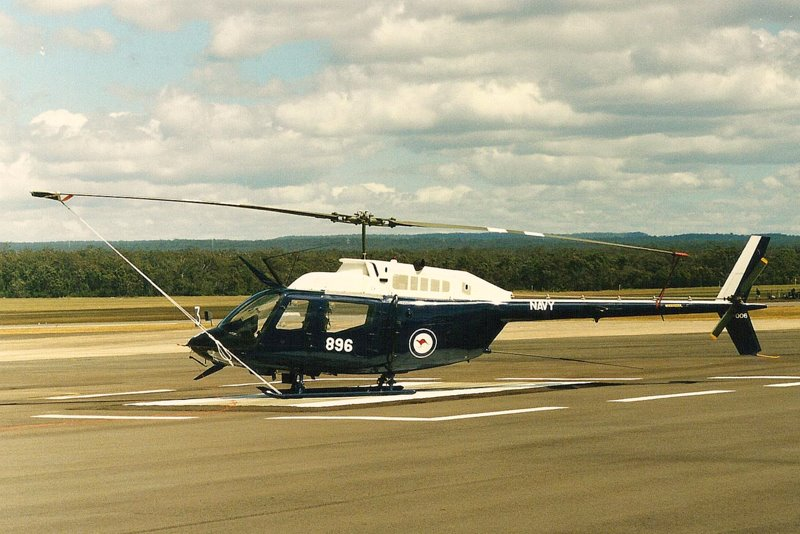
A Bell Kiowa of 723 Squadron in 1998

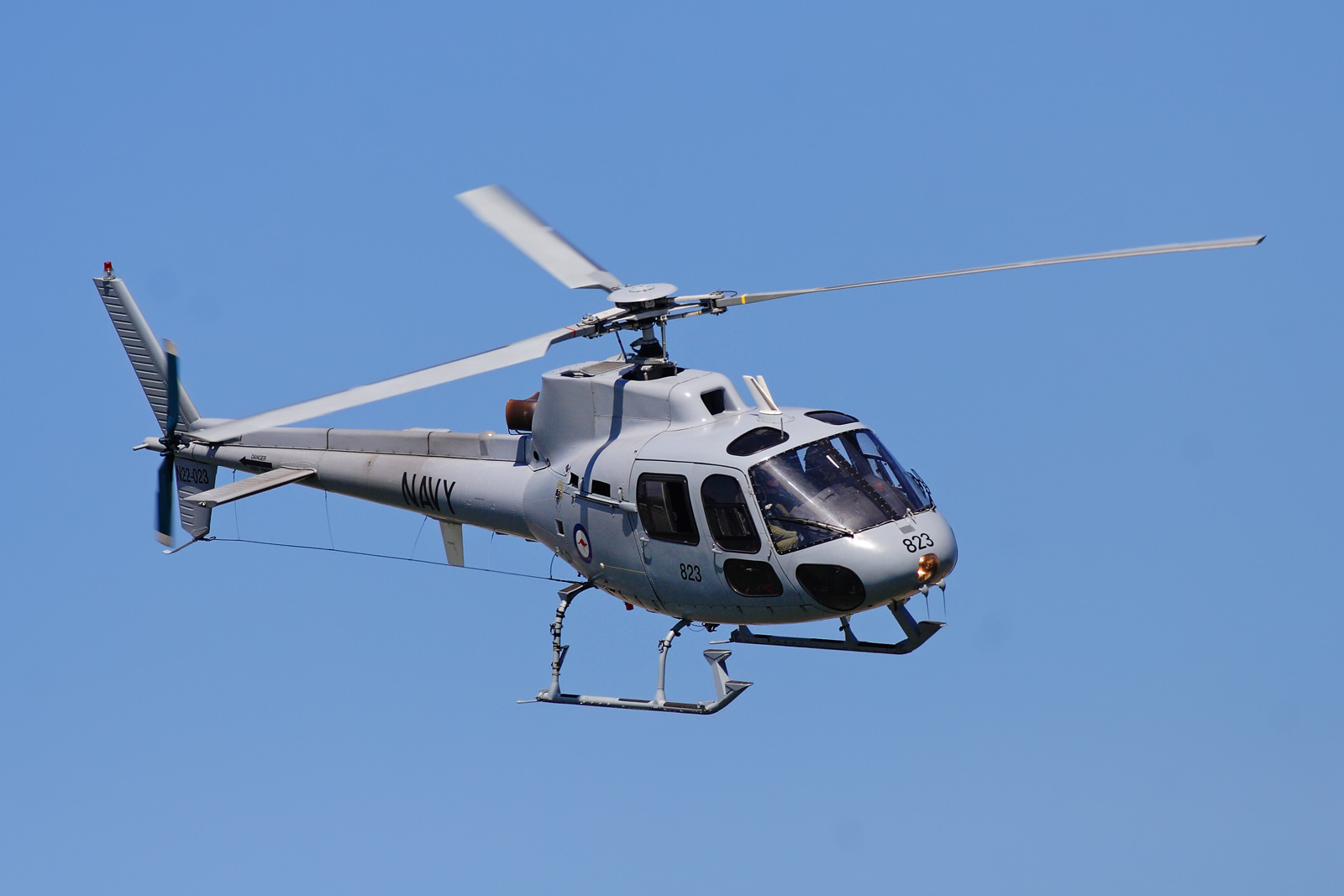
A 723 Squadron Squirrel in 2008

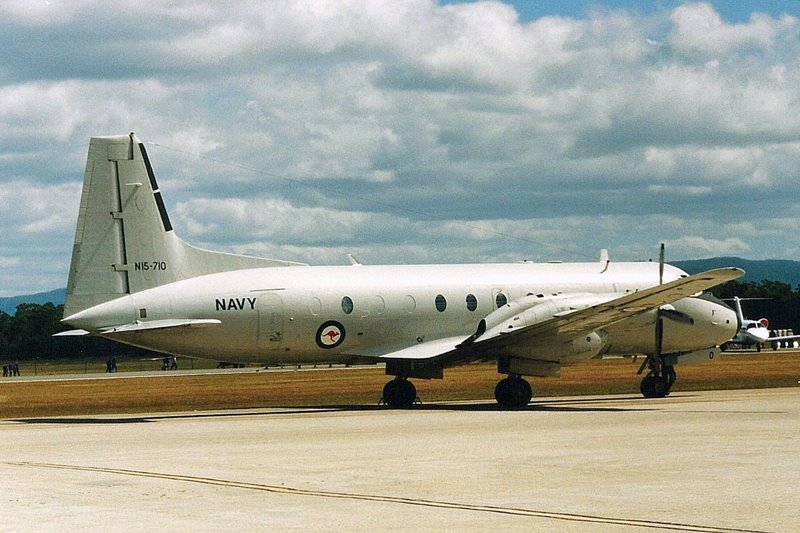
A 723 Squadron Hawker Siddeley HS 748

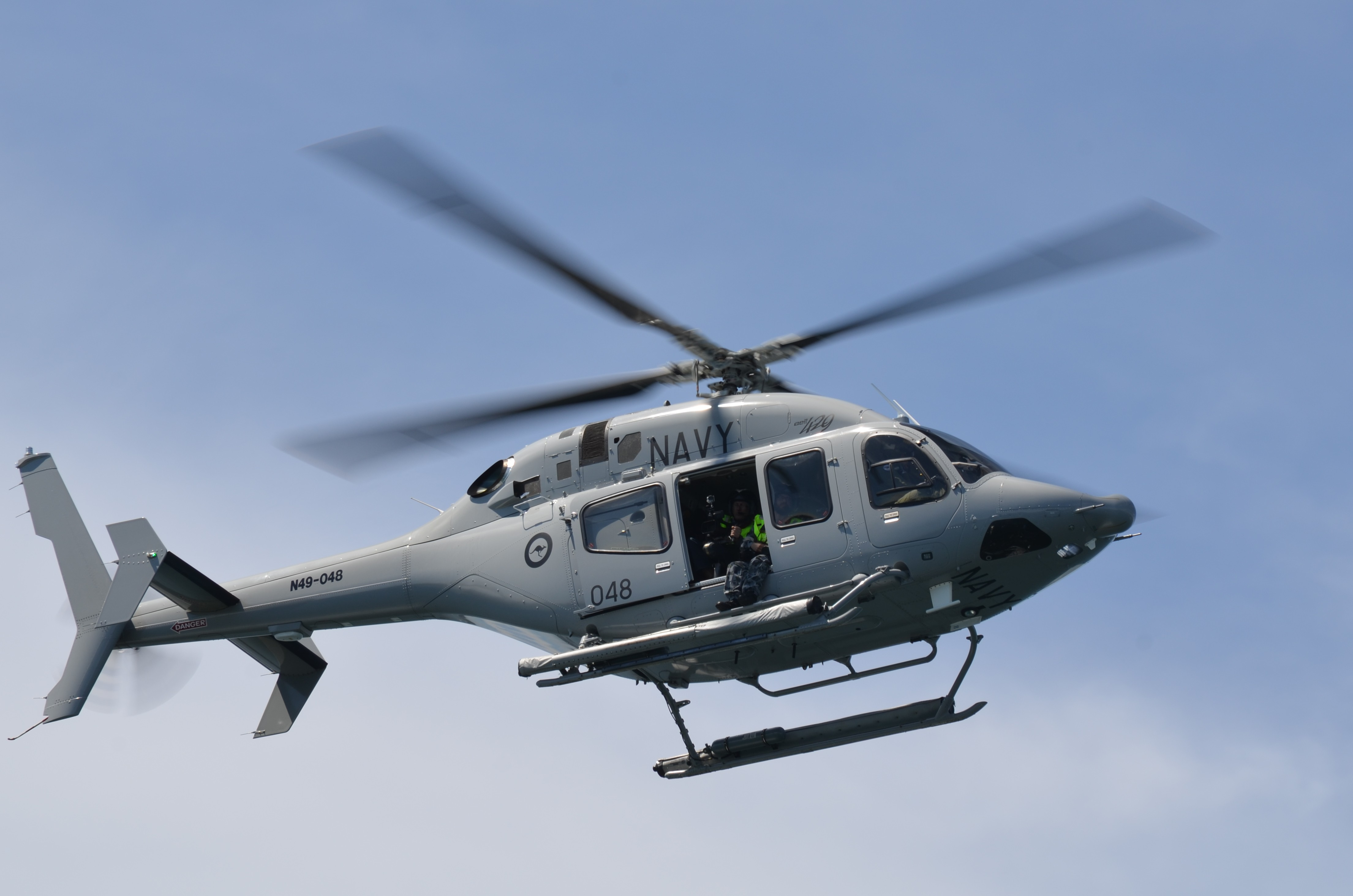
Royal Australian Navy Bell 429 of 723 Squadron in 2013

The squadron has operated a number of different aircraft types, including:

- CAC Wirraway (April 1952 - October 1956)
- Hawker Sea Fury FB.11 (April 1952 - October 1956)
- Supermarine Sea Otter I/II (April 1952 - October 1956)
- Douglas C-47A Dakota (April 1952 - October 1956, October 1961 - November 1962)
- Fairey Firefly Mk 5 (January 1954 - February 1955)
- Fairey Firefly T.Mk 2 (January 1954 - February 1955)
- Fairey Firefly Mk 6 (May 1954 - October 1956)
- de Havilland Vampire T.34 (September 1954 - October 1956)
- Bristol Sycamore HR.50 (March 1953 - October 1956, February 1957 - November 1963)
- Bristol Sycamore HR.51 (January 1955 - October 1956, February 1957 - June 1965)
- Fairey Firefly TT.Mk 5 (November 1954 - October 1956)
- Auster Autocar (December 1954 - October 1956, February 1959 - November 1962)
- Fairey Firefly TT.Mk 6 (May 1959 - November 1962)
- Westland Scout AH.1 (April 1963 - July 1973)
- Bell UH-1 Iroquois UH-1B (May 1964 - May 1989)
- Bell/CAC 206B-1 Kiowa (June 1974 - October 2000)
- Westland Wessex HAS.31B (February 1978 - February 1984, July 1987 - December 1989)
- Aerospatiale AS 350B Ecureuil (Squirrel) May 1984 - December 1998)
- Hawker Siddeley HS 748 (September 1984 - June 2000)
- Aerospatiale AS 350BA Ecureuil (Squirrel) (January 1998 - December 2017)
- Agusta A109E Power (November 2007 - March 2012)
- Bell 429 (April 2012 - April 2019)
- EC-135T2+ (March 2016 - date)
