= 816 Squadron RAN =

Flying squadron of the Royal Australian Navy's Fleet Air Arm

816 Squadron
- Unit badge for 816 Squadron
- Active: 1948–1987; 1992–Current
- Country: Australia
- Branch: Royal Australian Navy (1948–1967); Royal Australian Navy (1967–Present)
- Type: Ship-based helicopter squadron
- Role: Small ship flights
- Part of: Fleet Air Arm
- Airbase: HMAS Albatross
- Motto(s): Imitate the action of the tiger
- Equipment: MH-60R Romeo

Commanders
- Current commander: Commander T. Glynn

816 Squadron is a Royal Australian Navy Fleet Air Arm squadron that started out as a Royal Navy unit, 816 Naval Air Squadron.

== Current roles ==
816 is currently active as a helicopter squadron equipped with MH-60R helicopters. The squadron is based at HMAS Albatross in Nowra and primarily operates from the Navy's Adelaide and Anzac class frigates. 816 Squadron provides the fleet with anti-submarine and anti-surface surveillance capabilities.

== History ==
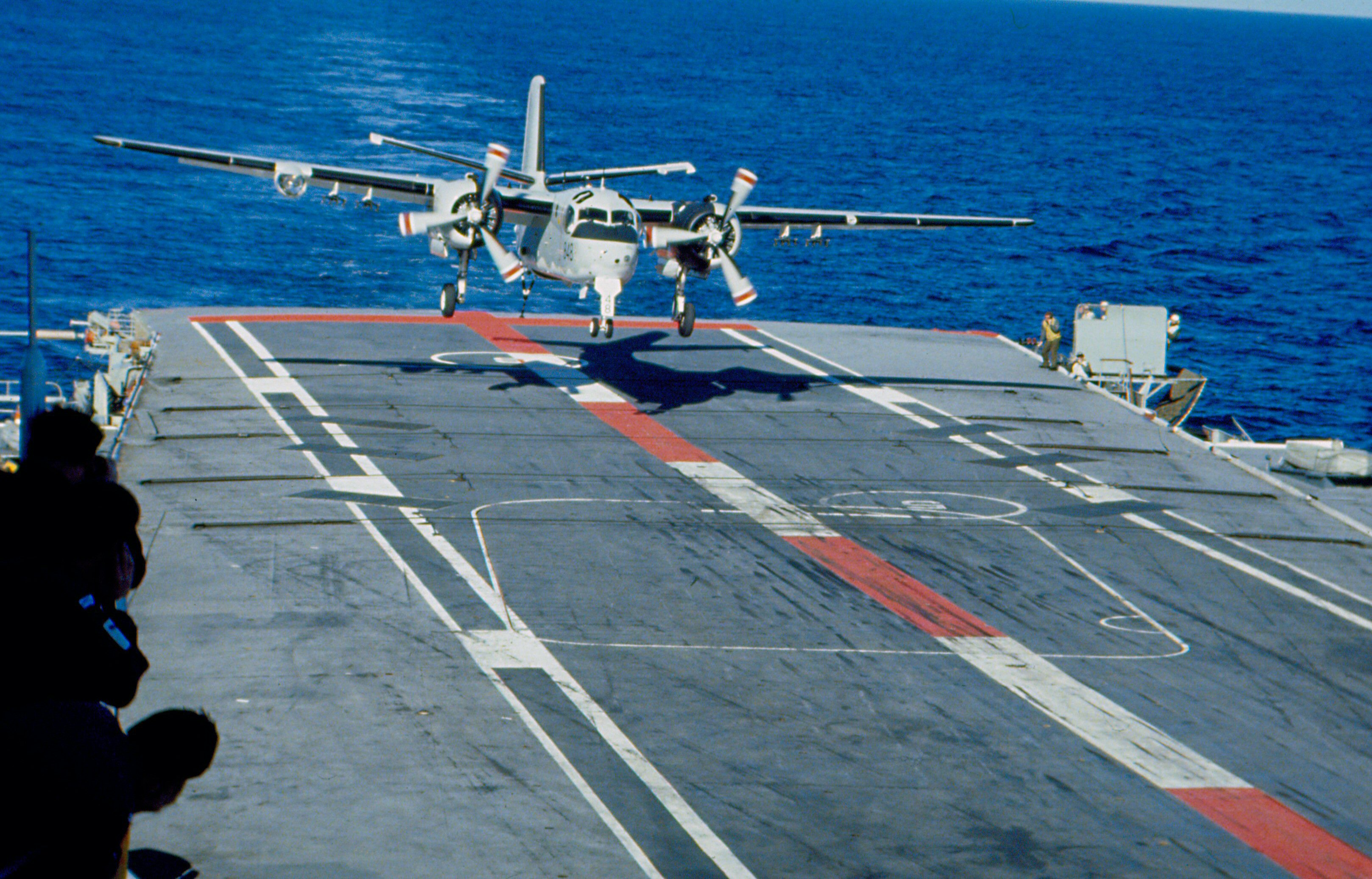
An S-2G Tracker of 816 Squadron lands on HMAS Melbourne

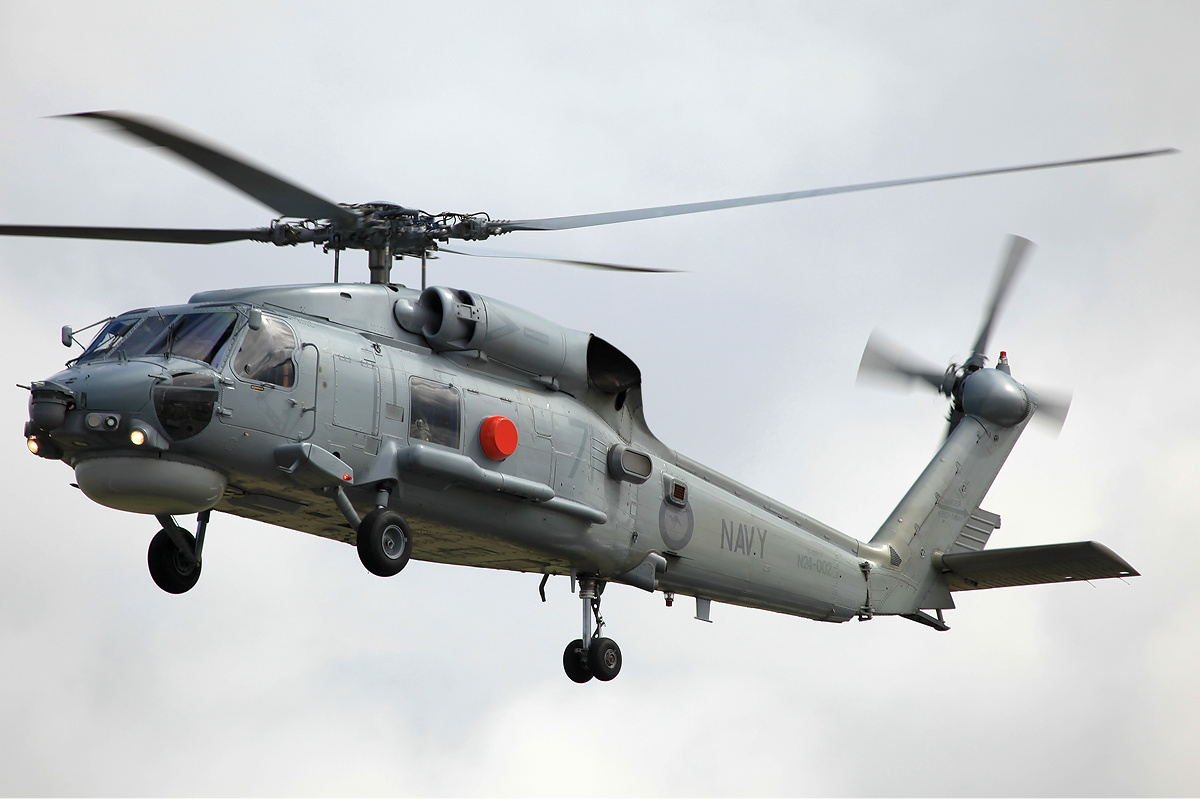
An 816 Squadron S-70B-2 Seahawk in 2011

816 Squadron was first formed as a Royal Navy Fleet Air Arm carrier based squadron in 1939 embarked in HMS Furious.

In 1948 816 Squadron was re-formed as a Royal Australian Navy FAA squadron operating Fairey Firefly aircraft. The squadron formed part of the 20th Carrier Air Group embarked on HMAS Sydney. In 1952, 816 Squadron participated in the Montebello Islands atomic weapons tests and in 1953 saw service in the Korean War.

Over the following 40 years, 816 squadron was disbanded and re-formed several times as newer aircraft were introduced.

In 1956 with the arrival of HMAS Melbourne, 816 Squadron embarked as part of the 21st Carrier Air Group equipped with Gannet and Sea Venom aircraft. In 1967 the RAN acquired newer aircraft and Melbourne was extensively upgraded to handle the faster and heavier aircraft. 816 Squadron was re-equipped with Grumman S-2E Trackers.

On 5 December 1976, a fire was deliberately lit by a Fleet Air Arm member near the aircraft hangars at HMAS Albatross. The fire destroyed or seriously damaged twelve of the thirteen S-2 Trackers in the RAN's possession. Subsequently, 15 second-hand S2-G Trackers were purchased from the United States Government and all remaining serviceable or repairable S2-E Trackers were upgraded to the S-2G standard. 816 Squadron continued to operate S-2Gs until the decommissioning of HMAS Melbourne in 1982, when the squadron was again disbanded.

From 1984 until 1987, 816 Squadron operated Westland Wessex helicopters in the Army support role.

816 Squadron was re-formed in 1992 to operate Sikorsky Seahawk helicopters. The squadron has embarked helicopters on RAN Adelaide class and Anzac class frigates and has participated in operations including in the Persian Gulf.

The squadron will continue to operate the Seahawk after the retirement of the S-70B-2 model. On 13 December 2012 it was announced that 816 Squadron will transition to the new MH-60R Seahawk, with 725 Squadron being reformed to be the training squadron.

== Aircraft ==
=== Current RAN service ===
- Sikorsky MH-60R Romeo (Anti Submarine Warfare, Anti Shipping, Surveillance & Targeting)

=== Previous RAN service ===
- Fairey Firefly FR.4, FR.5 & FR.6 (Attack Reconnaissance)
- Fairey Gannet AS.1 & T.2 (Anti Submarine Warfare)
- de Havilland Sea Venom FAW.53
- Grumman S-2E & S2-G Tracker (Anti Submarine Warfare)
- Westland Wessex HAS 31B (Army Support)
- Sikorsky S-70B-2 Seahawk (Anti Submarine Warfare, Anti Shipping, Surveillance & Targeting)

=== RN service ===
- Fairey Swordfish I (Anti submarine Warfare, Search)
- Fairey Swordfish II (Strike)
- Supermarine Seafire Ib & L.IIc (Strike)
- Grumman Wildcat V (Strike)
- Fairey Barracuda II (Torpedo Bomber)
- Fairey Firefly FR.I (Fighter Reconnaissance)
- Fairey Firefly NF.I (Night Fighter)

== Sources ==
- 816 Squadron Official Website
  - 816 Squadron History
