= Grumman S-2 Tracker in Australian service =

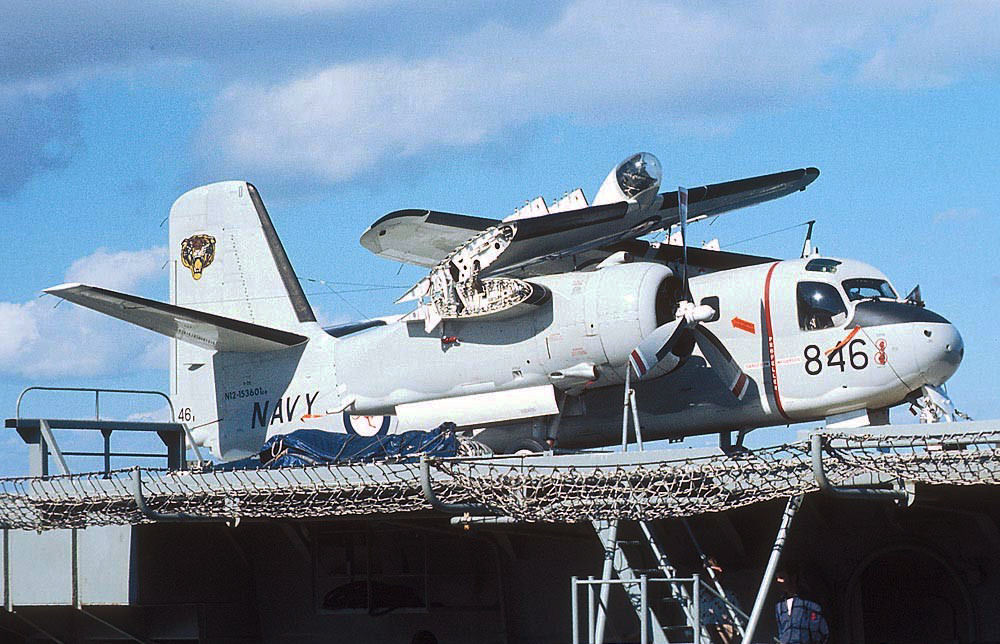
- A Royal Australian Navy S-2G Tracker in 1977

General information
- Type: Anti-submarine warfare
- Manufacturer: Grumman

History
- In service: 1967–1984

The Royal Australian Navy operated Grumman S-2 Tracker anti-submarine warfare aircraft from 1967 to 1984. The type flew from the aircraft carrier HMAS Melbourne and shore bases. A total of 32 Trackers were purchased in two batches which were delivered in 1967 and 1977.

An order for 14 S-2E Tracker operational aircraft and two S-2A ground trainers was placed in 1964 as part of a project to reinvigorate the Navy's aviation capability. The aircraft were delivered in 1967 and began to enter service the next year. They proved successful in their intended role, and were also used for land-based patrols. They did not see combat, but operated from Melbourne across the Pacific region during training exercises and patrols. All but three of the S-2Es were destroyed by a deliberately lit fire in December 1976, and 16 S-2G Trackers were rapidly acquired to replace them. These aircraft entered service in 1977 and undertook the same tasks as the S-2Es. After Melbourne was decommissioned without replacement in 1982 the Government decided to dispose of the Trackers, and most of the fleet was sold in 1984.

== Acquisition ==
During the late 1950s the Australian Government and Royal Australian Navy (RAN) considered options to replace the aircraft carrier HMAS Melbourne, and her air group. While Melbourne had only been commissioned in 1955, the de Havilland Sea Venom fighters and Fairey Gannet maritime patrol aircraft operated by the Fleet Air Arm (FAA) were becoming obsolete. It was believed that Melbourne was too small to operate more modern aircraft types, and the RAN investigated options to buy a larger carrier. The Government judged that the cost of a new aircraft carrier was too high, especially given the expense of the Australian Army and Royal Australian Air Force's (RAAF's) procurement programs at that time, and in November 1959 it was announced that the FAA would cease to operate fixed-wing aircraft in 1963.

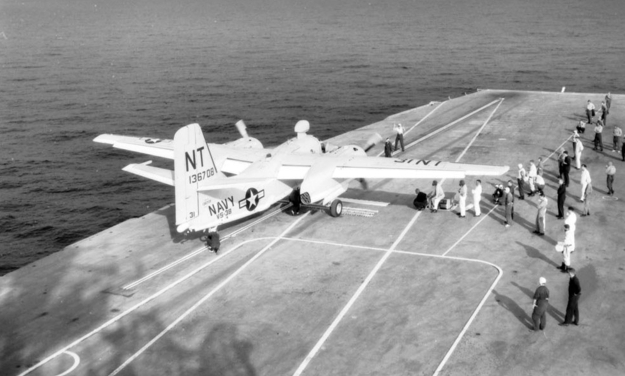
A United States Navy S2E Tracker operating from HMAS Melbourne in April 1962 as part of trials to determine the suitability of the type for Australian service

As a result of intervention by the Minister for the Navy, Senator John Gorton, the Government eventually agreed to purchase new fixed-wing aircraft. Gorton had served as a fighter pilot in World War II and had a strong interest in his portfolio. In 1961 Gorton convinced the Cabinet to fund a program to reinvigorate the FAA, starting with the purchase of 27 Westland Wessex anti-submarine helicopters. At this time it was planned to retain Melbourne as a helicopter carrier, but in mid-1963 the Government gave the Navy permission to retain the Sea Venoms and Gannets in service until at least 1967. Minister for Defence Senator Shane Paltridge rejected a proposal from the Navy to purchase an Essex-class aircraft carrier from the United States Navy in June 1964, and the next month Melbourne undertook flight trials with Douglas A-4 Skyhawk fighters and Grumman S-2 Tracker anti-submarine aircraft during a visit to U.S. Naval Base Subic Bay in the Philippines. American Trackers had previously operated from Melbourne in 1957 and several other occasions. The July 1964 trials proved that Melbourne could safely operate both types without the need for major modifications.

In November 1964 Cabinet considered a proposal to modernise Melbourne and purchase 18 Skyhawks and 16 Trackers. It decided against acquiring Skyhawks, but agreed to the remainder of the project. Following further lobbying and staff work by the Navy, the Government eventually agreed to also purchase ten A-4G Skyhawks in early 1965. The cost of the Tracker acquisition was $A16.4 million.

The Tracker order comprised 14 of the S-2E model, which were intended for operational service, and two former US Navy S-2A variants which were to be used as non-flying training aids and instructional airframes. The S-2E Tracker was a twin-engined aircraft with a crew of four. It could be armed with two homing torpedoes, two depth bombs or four depth charges within its weapons bay. 250 lb bombs or Mk 32 Zuni rockets could be mounted on its wings. The aircraft had a maximum range of 2,092 kilometres (1,300 mi) and could stay aloft for up to nine hours. Its sensors included a AN/APS 39 radar and a magnetic anomaly detector, which extended from the belly and tail of the aircraft respectively. They could also carry sonobuoys to track submarines. Trackers had first entered service with the US Navy in 1954, and 1,285 were eventually produced.

== Preparations ==
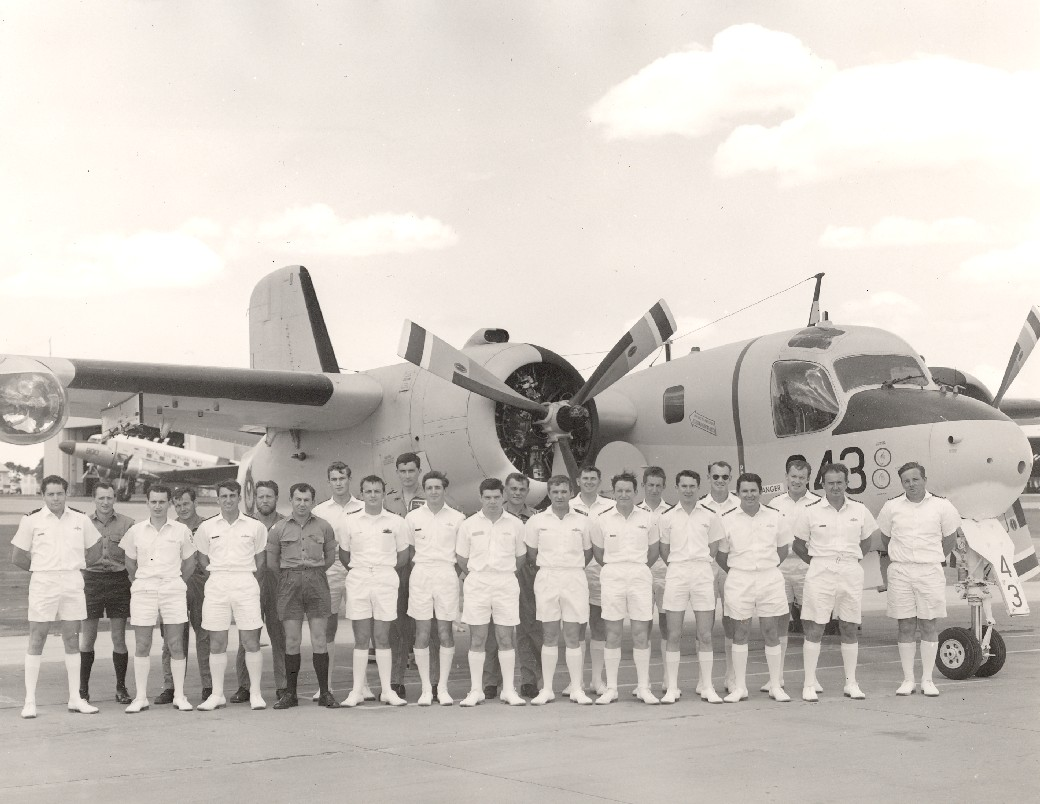
Members of 851 Squadron with an S-2E Tracker in 1968

RAN personnel were trained to operate Trackers in North America during 1966 and 1967. The first RAN pilots to quality on the type were trained in Canada. Other pilots received training on the type at a US Navy facility at Corpus Christi, Texas. A detachment of maintenance personnel began a training program in the United States during mid-1966 and completed it late the next year.

The RAN decided to use a different flight-deck crew composition for its Trackers than the US Navy and Royal Canadian Navy. Both of these navies crewed their Trackers with a pilot as well as a co-pilot who doubled as the tactical coordinator (TACCO). As the RAN had a large number of highly experienced observers who had served on board Gannets, it decided to employ a single pilot and an observer who also served as the TACCO. This reduced the efficiency of the RAN's Trackers and increased the risk of accidents due to pilot fatigue. The other two members of the aircraft's crew were an observer and an air crewman.

Melbourne travelled to the United States to pick up her new aircraft in late 1967, and returned to Sydney with them on 22 November that year. They were offloaded and transported by road to Mascot Airport. After receiving mechanical checks and test flights, the Trackers flew to HMAS Albatross, the Navy's air base, later that year. Melbourne commenced a refit to prepare her to operate the Skyhawks and Trackers.

The Trackers were allocated to two flying squadrons. 816 Squadron was the primary operator, and flew the aircraft from Melbourne. 851 Squadron used Trackers for training purposes. 816 Squadron recommissioned with the type on 10 January 1968, followed by 851 Squadron on 2 September that year.

After Melbourne's refit was complete and the two squadrons had completed flight training, test flights of the S-2Es from the carrier began in March 1969. Landing was considered challenging, as there was only a 1.2-metre (3.9 ft) gap between the Tracker's right wing and Melbourne's island when aircraft landed on the right-hand side of the centreline. The trials proved successful, and the type was certified for operations from Melbourne.

The RAN also acquired a Tracker Weapons Systems Trainer to support the aircraft. This system was delivered in 1967, and was initially installed in a pair of trailers; one trailer carried cockpit and instrument consoles and the other a computer, electronics and a workshop. The Tracker Weapons Systems Trainer was badly damaged by a fire started in a tea urn before it entered service, and had to be sent back to the United States for repairs. After these were complete, the system was installed in a building at HMAS Albatross.

== Operational service ==
=== S-2E Tracker ===
Melbourne's first deployment with her new air group commenced in May 1969. During an exercise conducted in this deployment, Skyhawks flying from the carrier made a simulated attack on an "enemy" force which had first been detected by Trackers. On the night of 2–3 June 1969, the aircraft carrier HMAS Melbourne and her escorts were involved in anti-submarine training exercises in the South China Sea. In preparation for launching a Tracker, Melbourne’s Captain Stevenson ordered the US destroyer, Frank E. Evans to plane guard station (aircraft rescue position), due to confusion the Melbourne hit Evans amidships at 3:15 am, the tragedy cutting the destroyer in two. The Tracker never took off, the Tracker it was to replace on patrol, had to bunny hop back to HMAS Albatross. 816 Squadron regularly operated from Melbourne throughout the early 1970s, and the Trackers proved successful in the anti-submarine role. During this period the aircraft carrier frequently made deployments across the Pacific. It was found that the Trackers could handle the same tasks as the RAAF's larger Lockheed P-3 Orion maritime patrol aircraft, though the Trackers had shorter range and could not carry as many weapons. The aircraft's engines also proved to be extremely reliable.

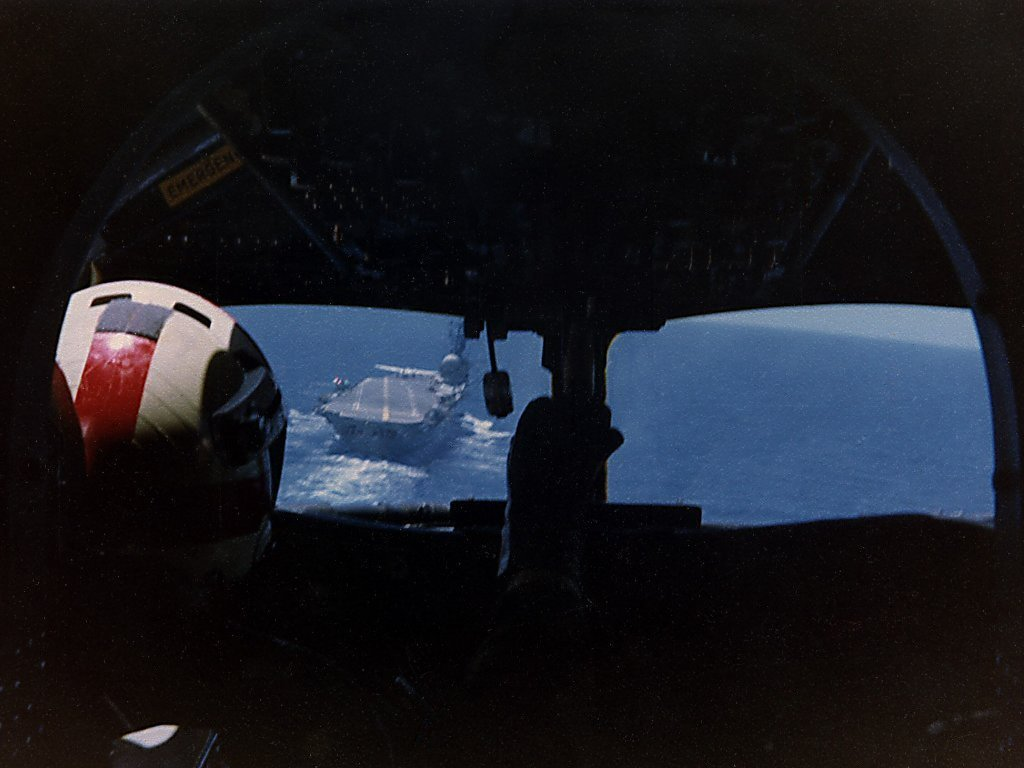
The view from the cockpit of a Tracker preparing to land on HMAS Melbourne

On 10 February 1975 Tracker 853 was destroyed when it landed, the pilot thought it did a bolter (missed the wire), revved up and the pull of the wire slung it violently over the port side into the sea. All four members of the crew were rescued. This was the only loss of a RAN Tracker during flying operations.

Trackers conducted fisheries protection patrols from 1975, an operation called Operation Trochus. This task began on 6 March, when three Trackers from 851 Squadron began what was intended as a twelve month operation from Broome, Western Australia. 816 Squadron took over on 6 May 1975. The Trackers proved so successful, the Australian Government decided the flights would be extended. Responsibility for land-based maritime patrols was exchanged between the two squadrons until December 1980. After this time a civilian company conducted the patrols. The detachment moved to Darwin, Northern Territory at a date not specified in the sources.

Disaster struck the S-2E fleet on the evening of 4 December 1976 when a 19-year-old junior sailor from 851 Squadron deliberately started a fire in H hangar at HMAS Albatross. All but one of the aircraft had been placed in storage for the Christmas period; the remaining aircraft was under maintenance at Bankstown Airport. Despite very dangerous conditions, RAN personnel attempted to fight the fire and move aircraft from the hangar. These efforts were largely unsuccessful, and nine aircraft were destroyed or damaged beyond repair. The other three aircraft were damaged, of which only two were ever repaired. The 19-year old sailor responsible admitted to starting the fire. At his court martial he was found to have not been responsible for his actions due to mental illness.

=== S-2G Tracker ===
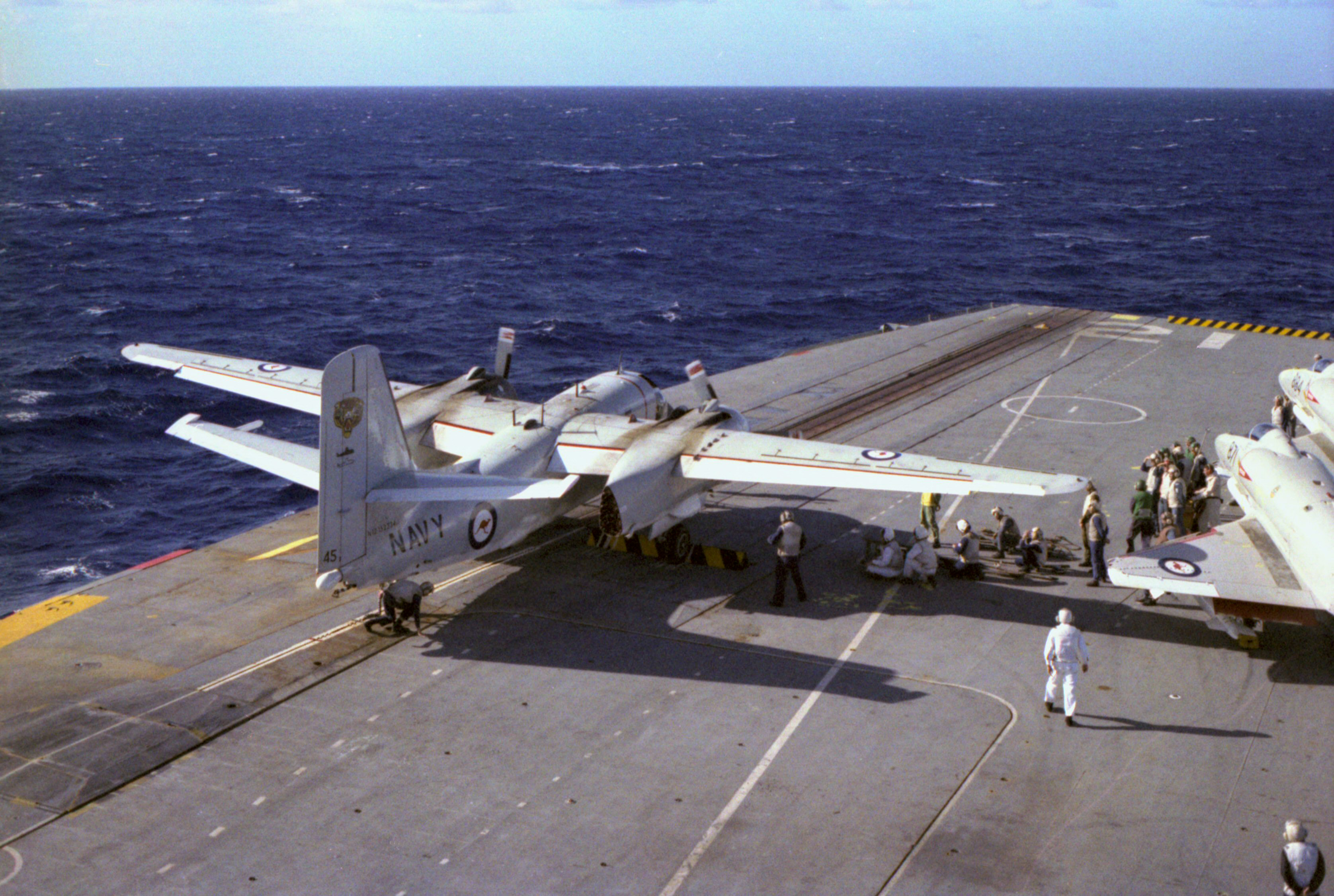
Tracker 845 being prepared for launch in 1980

The RAN was able to rapidly rebuild its Tracker fleet. An order for six ex-US Navy S-2G Trackers had been placed in October 1976 to modernise the force. This order was increased to sixteen S-2Gs soon after the fire. The US Government sold the aircraft at a discount of 97 percent of their value, and allowed a RAN team to select airframes from US Navy stores shortly after the order was placed. The US Navy also donated spare parts to Australia. The aircraft were refurbished and then flown to San Diego, where in March 1977 they were loaded onto Melbourne. The aircraft entered service shortly afterwards.

The S-2Gs' performance and features were similar to the S-2Es. Their sonic systems were upgraded during 1977 and 1978 to enable the use of more advanced sonobuoys. In 1978 Hawker de Havilland approached the Navy with a proposal to upgrade several of the Trackers' surveillance systems at a cost of between $1 and $1.5 million per aircraft. This proposal was rejected.

In mid-1977 Melbourne travelled to the United Kingdom with 816 Squadron aircraft embarked to participate in a fleet review organised to mark the Silver Jubilee of Elizabeth II. The ageing carrier took part in regular training exercises for the rest of the 1970s. Following an accident on 21 October 1980 in which a Skyhawk was destroyed due to a malfunction in Melbourne's catapult, Trackers were the only fixed-wing aircraft to operate from the carrier for the remainder of its career. In June 1981 a Tracker operating from Melbourne in the South China Sea spotted a boat carrying 99 Vietnamese refugees. The carrier rescued all of the refugees.

From November 1977 land-based Tracker patrols were expanded. The detachment at Darwin began conducting patrols to locate boats carrying refugees escaping from Vietnam. In 1980, the type also began to be used for anti-terrorism patrols around oil rigs in the Bass Strait. The later task continued until 31 December 1983.

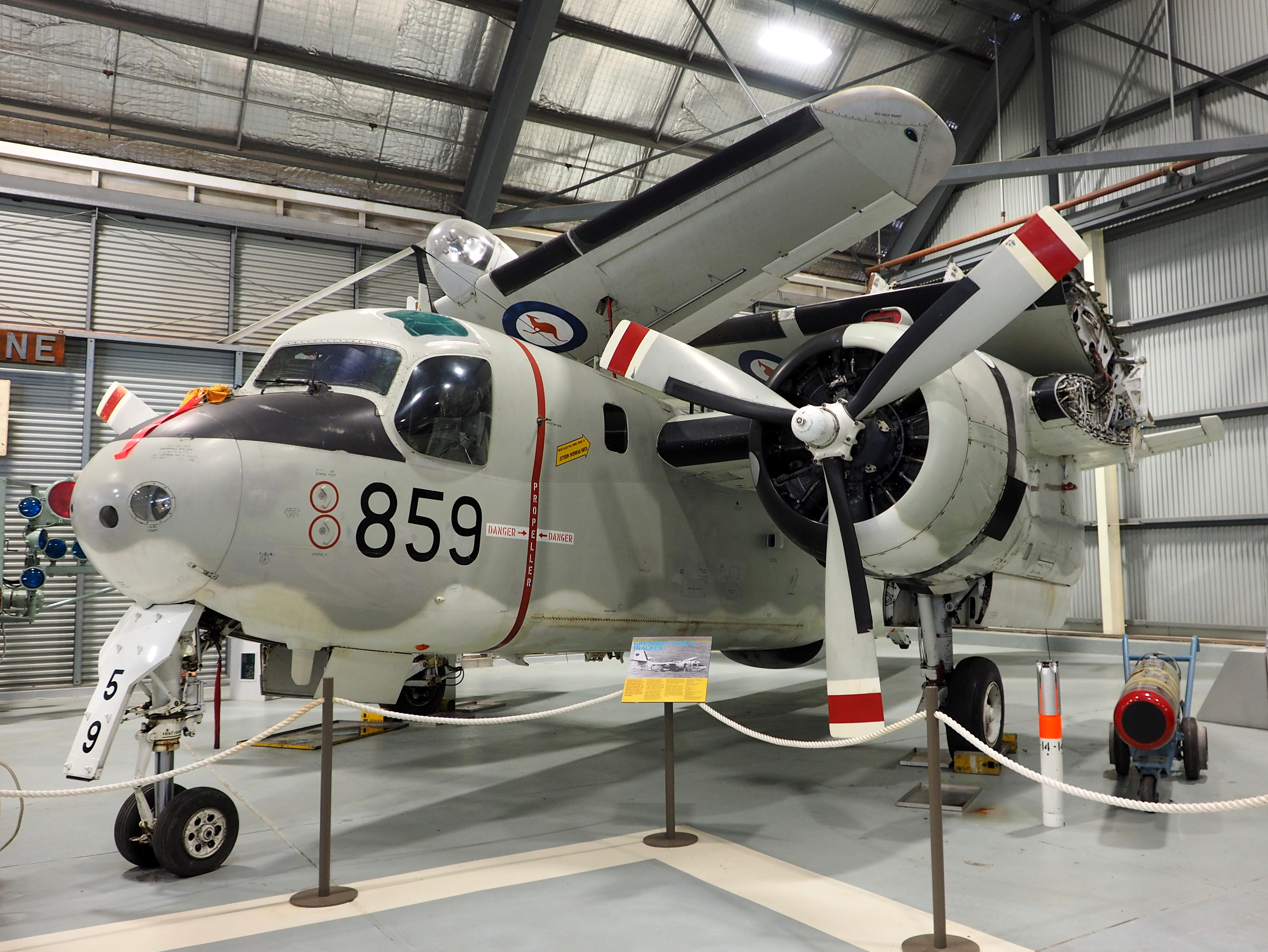
A former RAN Tracker on display at the Fleet Air Arm Museum in 2015

Melbourne completed its final deployment in November 1981, and was decommissioned in June the next year. 816 Squadron was merged into 851 Squadron on 2 July 1982. 851 Squadron continued to use Trackers for maritime patrol tasks while the Government considered whether to purchase a new aircraft carrier or offer the aircraft for sale. It was eventually decided to not replace the carrier and sell the Trackers, and they were last flown in RAN service in December 1983. The Trackers were officially withdrawn from service in June 1984. The RAN's next dedicated anti-submarine and surveillance aircraft were Sikorsky S-70B-2 Seahawk helicopters. These helicopters began to enter service in 1988 and were operated from frigates.

After eight years stored at HMAS Albatross, 11 were and ferried to West Sale Airport in 1991. All but two of the aircraft were subsequently sold to the United Aeronautical Corporation. The other aircraft were retained in Australia. Tracker 859 is preserved at the Fleet Air Arm Museum and the airworthy 844 was relocated to the Historical Aircraft Restoration Society, Shellharbour Airport in September 2019. Several other ex-RAN Trackers had been preserved in Australia or were in storage in the United States as of 2019.

== See also ==
- List of displayed Grumman S-2 Trackers
