= Douglas A-4 Skyhawk in New Zealand service =

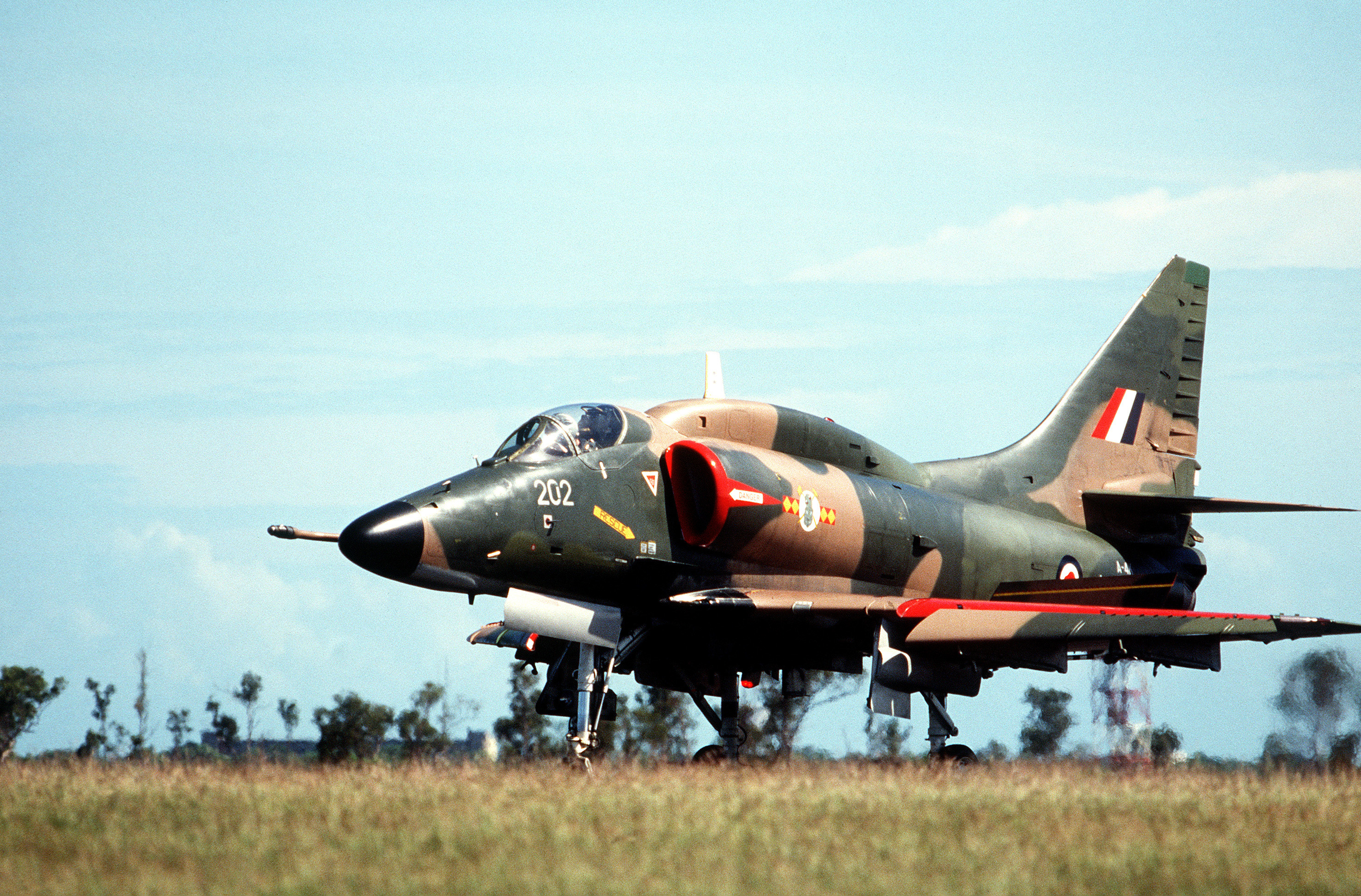
A A-4K Skyhawk of No. 75 Squadron at the Royal Australian Air Force's base at Darwin, 1984

The Royal New Zealand Air Force (RNZAF) operated Douglas A-4 Skyhawk attack jet-aircraft from 1970 to 2001. The aircraft equipped the RNZAF's Strike Wing, serving with No. 75 Squadron and, from 1984, No. 2 Squadron. In late 2001, the aircraft were controversially withdrawn from service without being replaced. Some were donated to aviation museums in New Zealand and Australia and the remainder were sold to Draken International, a private military contractor to the United States, in 2012.

== Background ==
The Douglas A-4 Skyhawk was developed by the Douglas Aircraft Company in the early 1950s as a subsonic attack aircraft for the United States Navy (USN). Entering service with the USN in 1956, the Skyhawk was an immediate success and flew in a number of conflicts around the world, ranging from the Vietnam War to the Falklands War, as well as the First Gulf War. With 2,960 examples of the various versions of the aircraft being built, it was operated by the air forces of several nations, including New Zealand. Its relatively low weight meant that it was able to incorporate new technologies as these were introduced and also carry a heavy payload, which led to a prolonged service life for the type, extending well into the 1990s.

== Acquisition ==
In 1962, when Air Vice-Marshal Ian Morrison became New Zealand's Chief of Air Staff (CAS), the Royal New Zealand Air Force (RNZAF) was in a period of decline, with an aging fleet of aircraft. On taking office, he sought to reinvigorate and reequip the RNZAF. His initial focus was to remedy the deficiencies in the RNZAF's transport and maritime capabilities, before addressing its air combat capacity. At the time, the RNZAF's Strike Wing was composed of one squadron equipped with English Electric Canberra jet-powered medium bombers, plus another that had a complement of de Havilland Vampire jet fighters albeit non-operational.

By May 1966, a number of aircraft had been considered as replacements for the RNZAF's Strike Wing, among them the General Dynamics F-111 bomber, Northrop F-5 Tiger, and the F-4 Phantom, the latter being the preference of both Morrison and the Defence Council. In contrast, for cost reasons the New Zealand Government preferred the F-5 Tiger. However, no decision had been made by the time Morrison's term as CAS ended later in the year. His replacement, Air Vice-Marshal Cameron Turner, together with Chief of Defence Staff Lieutenant General Leonard Thornton, continued with the efforts to modernise the Strike Wing. A key argument for this was the importance of being seen by New Zealand's allies, particularly Australia and the United States, as being able to contribute in an air combat role.

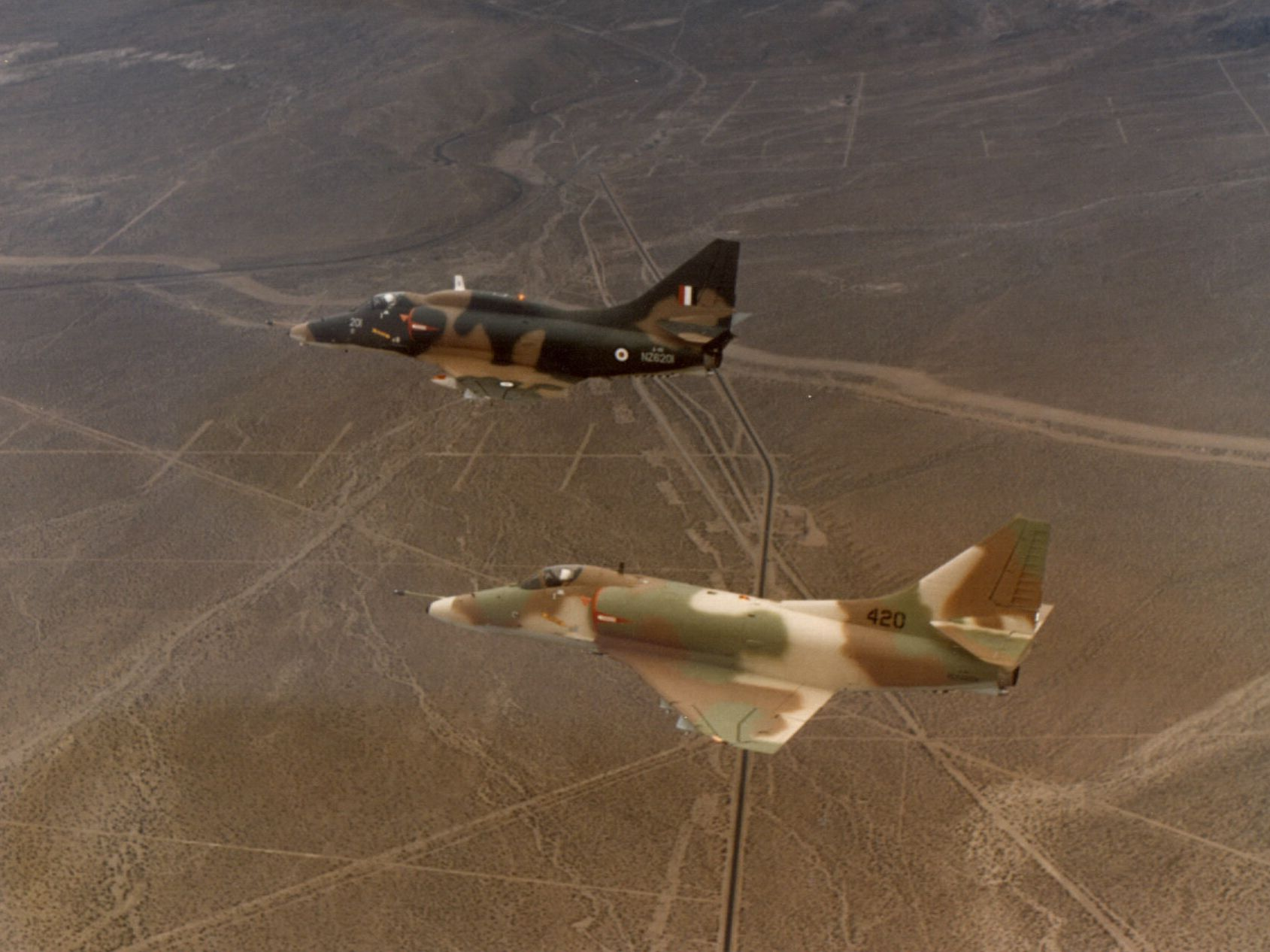
One of the RNZAF Skyhawks, top, flying in the United States in 1969 prior to being shipped to New Zealand. The other Skyhawk is intended for delivery to Israel

Cost continued to be an issue, and in late 1967 Turner was asked to reevaluate the Douglas A-4C Skyhawk. This had been among the aircraft considered for the air combat role in 1966 but it had not been favoured at the time due to its inferior performance relative to the likes of the F-4 Phantom. By 1967, the A-4F Skyhawk was in service and this was much improved from the earlier A-4C, having performed well in the Vietnam War. Approval was given for a team of RNZAF personnel to go to the United States to assess the Skyhawk for its suitability for its intended operational role in New Zealand. The leader of the team, Air Commodore T. Gill, reported that it would be an ideal replacement for the Canberras.

There were two purchase options; the first was for eighteen Skyhawks, twelve being single-seat A-4Fs and six two-seat TA-4Fs for training requirements, while the second was for ten single-seat and four two-seat examples. The RNZAF preferred the first option, with Gill recommending that four of the single-seat A-4Fs be set aside to allow for accidental losses. However, when the proposal was put to the New Zealand Government, it opted for the second option. Including spares and the necessary supporting equipment, the total cost was NZ$23 million, about NZ$936,000 per aircraft, with a further NZ$1.6 million to be spent upgrading airfield facilities. Approval for the purchase was made on 10 June 1968.

=== Skyhawk A-4K/TA-4K ===
In service with the RNZAF, the Skyhawks, based on the A-4F model, were designated as A-4K and TA-4TK respectively. The RNZAF requested some minor changes be made to its aircraft: a drag chute, a VHF radio and armament pylons suitable for carrying the AIM-9 Sidewinder missile. A notable inclusion was a dorsal hump aft of the cockpit, intended to house additional avionics controllers that were required to operate electronic countermeasures (ECM). The wiring and controller hardware for the ECM were present in the RNZAF aircraft but without the controllers, which were never installed, were inoperable. The onboard electronics provided were relatively unsophisticated, dating back to the earlier A-4C model of the late 1950s. The weaponry included with the purchase, in addition to the Sidewinders, included 20-mm cannons, a range of conventional general purpose bombs and unguided rockets.

== Delivery ==
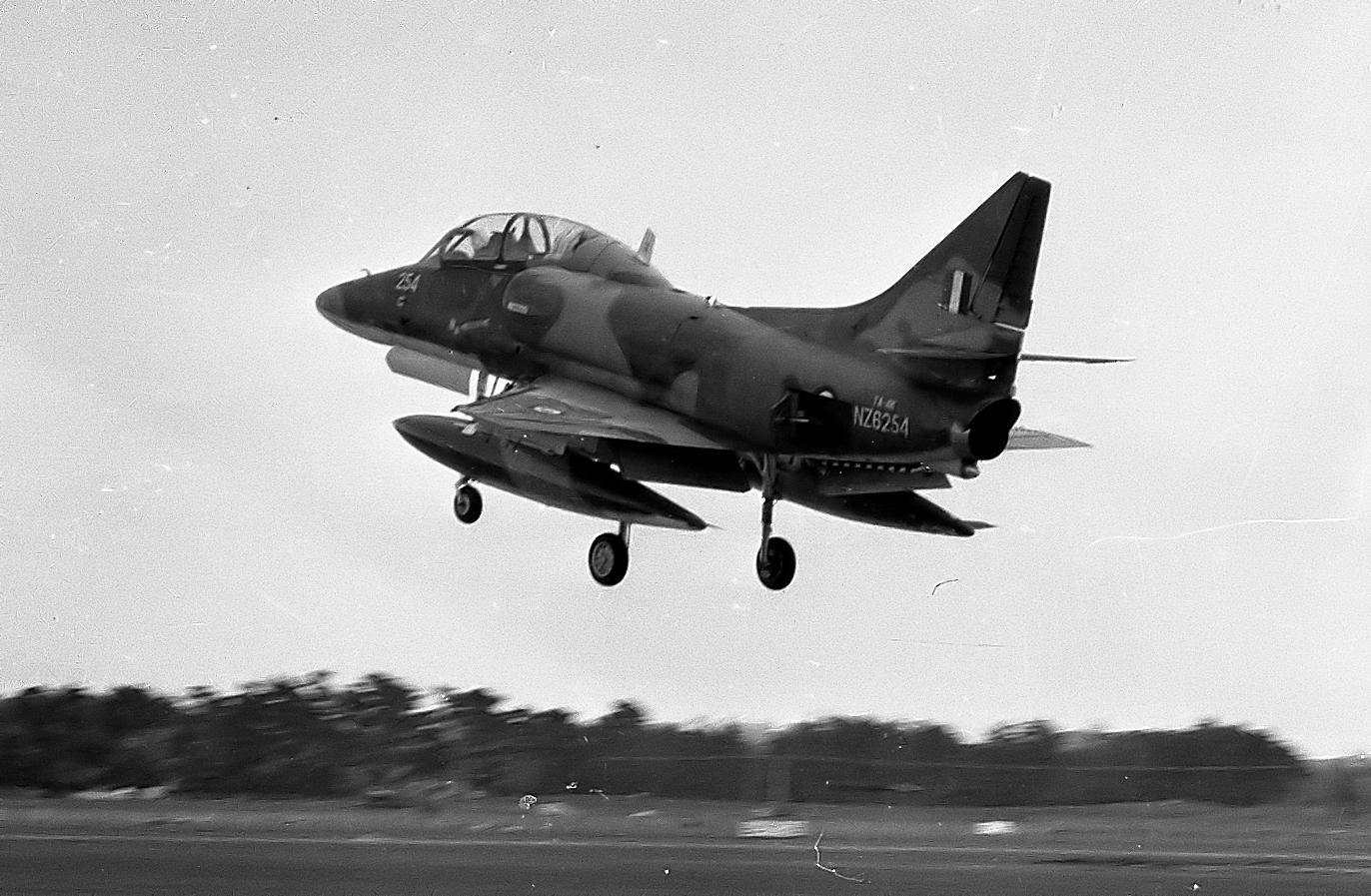
A TA-4K Skyhawk taking off from Ohakea in 1973

In June 1969, prior to the delivery of the RNZAF's Skyhawks, one pilot and some ground crew personnel were sent to the United States for training on the type with VA-44 at the USN's Naval Air Station Cecil Field in Jacksonville, Florida. The pilot, Squadron Leader Ross Donaldson, had qualified on the type by December but then suffered serious injuries in a bird strike while flying as a passenger in a TA-4F. On recovery, although no longer able to fly operationally, he worked to establish a training program for the following RNZAF pilots, who arrived at Jacksonville for training in early January 1970. Some other RNZAF ground crew personnel gained experience with the Skyhawks when sent to Vietnam for six weeks to serve with an A-4 squadron of the United States Marine Corps.

The first A-4K and TA-4K was officially handed over to the RNZAF in a ceremony at Cecil Field on 16 January. With training in the United States completed by April, all fourteen Skyhawks were loaded onto the USS Okinawa, a helicopter carrier, for transport to New Zealand. The ship arrived in Auckland on 17 May and the aircraft unloaded in front of a crowd of protesters. The Skyhawks were subsequently transported to Whenuapai from where they were prepared for their ferry flights to the RNZAF station at Ohakea. The first flight of a Skyhawk in New Zealand was on May 20, when a TA-4K was tested by Squadron Leader Scrimshaw, the commander of No. 75 Squadron, in preparation for the flight to Ohakea.

== Operational history ==
Skyhawk aircraft codes
RNZAF Tail No.	RAN Side No.	USN Bu. No.
NZ6201	-	157904
NZ6202	-	157905
NZ6203	-	157906
NZ6204	-	157907
NZ6205	-	157908
NZ6206	-	157909
NZ6207	-	157910
NZ6208	-	157911
NZ6209	-	157912
NZ6210	-	157913
NZ6211	882	154903
NZ6212	883	154904
NZ6213	884	154905
NZ6214	887	154906
NZ6215	871	155052
NZ6216	874	155061
NZ6217	876	155063
NZ6218	877	155069
NZ6251	-	157914
NZ6252	-	157915
NZ6253	-	157916
NZ6254	-	157917
NZ6255	880	154911
NZ6256	881	154912

In RNZAF service, the single-seat Skyhawks bore tail codes ranging from NZ6201 to NZ6210 while the two-seaters had tail codes NZ6251 to NZ6254. They originally carried a brown-green camouflage scheme but towards the end of 1984, the RNZAF adopted a grey-green pattern for its Skyhawks. The new scheme was quickly found to be very effective when operating over land and, because of there was no distinction between the upper and lower surfaces, during aerial engagements it was difficult for opponents to quickly detect whether the aircraft was turning towards or away from them. In 1997, an all-dark green scheme, with the roundel insignia and other markings represented in matt black, was adopted for the Skyhawks.

Ten of the Skyhawks, one being a single TA-4K, were assigned to No. 75 Squadron, and were officially handed over on 10 June. The remainder, three TA-4Ks plus the last single seater, were assigned to No. 14 Squadron; this was to act as a conversion unit, training pilots in jet fighter aircraft. It only performed this function up until 1975, at which time its Skyhawks were assigned to No. 75 Squadron. Newly purchased BAC Strikemaster aircraft was subsequently used to train pilots.

In 1984, ten more Skyhawks were purchased, these being sourced from Australia as they were surplus to requirements following the Royal Australian Navy (RAN)'s decommissioning of the aircraft carrier HMAS Melbourne. These aircraft were of A-4G (eight examples) and TA-4G (two examples) specification and, delivered to New Zealand in July, were upgraded to the RNZAF's A-4K and TA-4K specification. This brought the number of Skyhawks then in RNZAF service to twenty-two; two of the original complement had been lost in accidents. The ten Australian Skyhawks, which cost AU$28 million, also came with a significant amount of spare parts which considerably bolstered the RNZAF's stocks.

The tail codes applied by the RNZAF to the former RAN Skyhawks followed the numbering of those already in service: the A-4Gs were allocated NZ6211 to NZ6218 while the two TA-4Gs were designated NZ6255 and NZ6256 respectively. They carried their RAN grey two-tone camouflage scheme for a time until they received the RNZAF grey-green scheme.

=== Service with No. 75 Squadron ===
Equipped with the Skyhawks, No. 75 Squadron became the main component of the RNZAF's Strike Wing. It was regularly detached on training exercises with the Royal Australian Air Force (RAAF) and, up until 1984 and the breakdown in the ANZUS relationship, the United States Air Force (USAF). Some pilots of the squadron were sent on exchanges with the RAN, which also operated Skyhawks at the time. The squadron also routinely engaged in training with the air forces of many of the major Southeast Asia countries: Singapore, the Philippines, Malaysia and Indonesia. As New Zealand was part of the Five Power Defence Arrangements, it was required to provide military support to Singapore and Malaysia while the respective countries built up their military power. To participate in these exercises required long-distance flights for each aircraft with multiple refueling stops while en route. This was a major undertaking for single–engined jet aircraft.

By the mid-1970s, there were increasing tensions over foreign fishing fleets broaching the 12-mile (19 km) limit of New Zealand waters. In late March 1976, three Skyhawks were deployed to deter the escape of a Taiwanese fishing vessel that had been detected inside the 12-mile limit and had ignored the commands of a Royal New Zealand Navy (RNZN) patrol boat to heave to. Flight Lieutenant Jim Jennings fired the 20-mm cannons of his Skyhawk across the bows of the vessel, bring an immediate halt to its attempt to flee. This was the only occasion on which the type used its weapons outside of a training role.

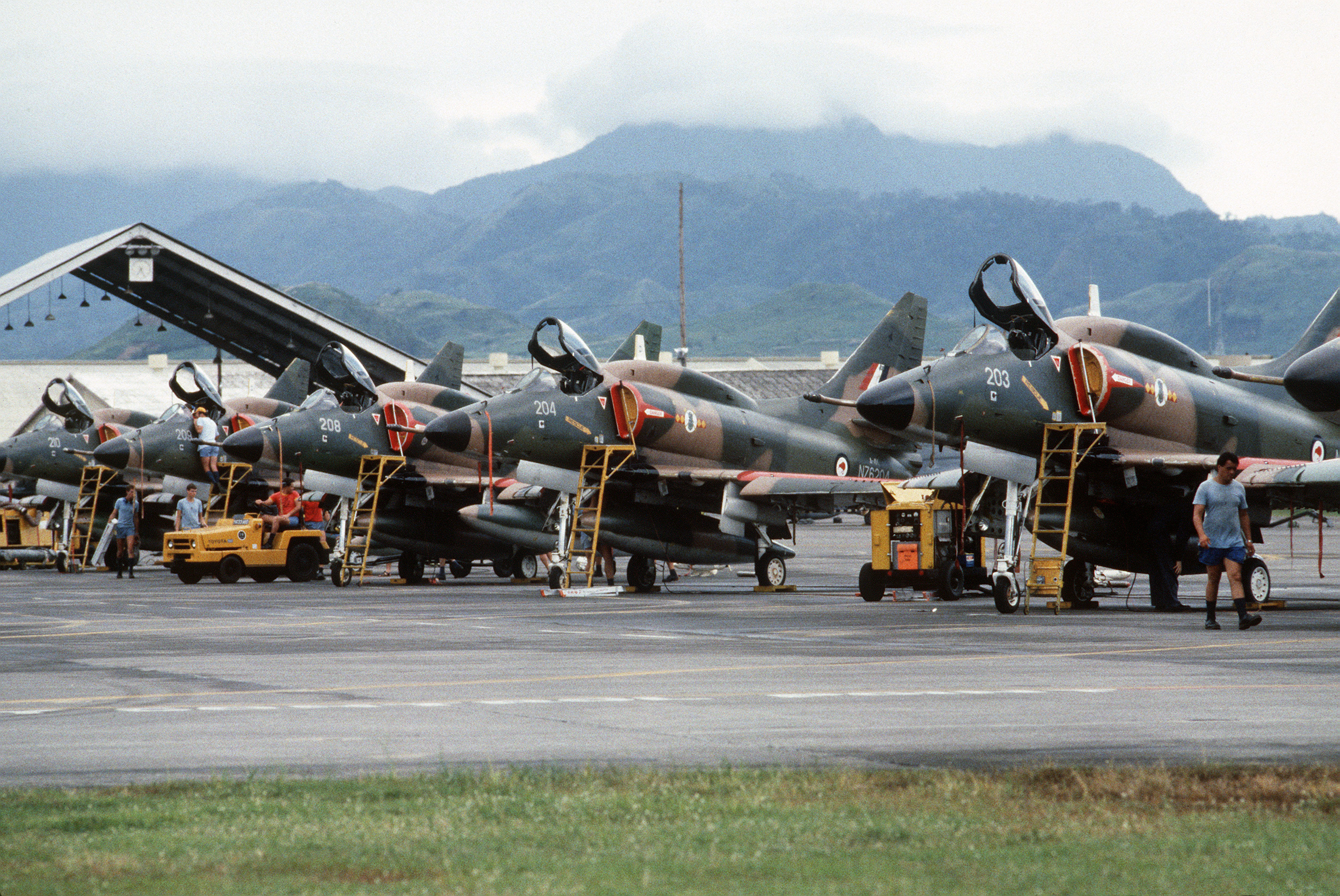
A line up of Skyhawks of No. 75 Squadron at Clark Air Base in the Philippines, during the Cope Thunder exercise of 1984

At the time of his deployment to the United States in 1969 to train on Skyhawks, Donaldson was the commander of No. 75 Squadron. During his period in command, he had set up the squadron's acrobatics display team. During 1983, the team performed the first instance of a barrel roll at low level by two aircraft connected to each other via an air refueling hose. Displays were flown at major celebratory events, including in Australia at the RAN's 75th anniversary in 1986, the RNZAF's 50th anniversary in 1987, at the Australian Bicentenary Airshow at Richmond in 1988 and at the opening of the 1990 Commonwealth Games.

On the outbreak of the First Gulf War in 1990, No. 75 Squadron intensified its training in anticipation of being dispatched to the Middle East. In the event, the New Zealand Government opted to send transport aircraft as the RNZAF's contribution to the United Nations' Desert Storm operations. The squadron continued to be engaged in regular training deployments to Australia and Southeast Asia over the next few years. One notable deployment was to Darwin in July–August 1999. At the time, there was considerable civil unrest in East Timor, to the north, and, in anticipation of a possible intervention from Australia, the Skyhawks carried out strike and maritime exercises with the RAN, the RNZN, as well as the Indonesian and Papua New Guinean military. Ultimately, No. 75 Squadron did not participate in the East Timor operation when it went ahead due to logistical constraints.

Morale in the RNZAF declined towards the end of the 1990s following a change of government in New Zealand. The political leadership abandoned plans to replace its strike aircraft and cancelled other upgrade programs. By May 2001, following the departure of several Skyhawk pilots from the RNZAF, there were only eight now available for the squadron's thirteen Skyhawks. One of these was the RNZAF's first female jet fighter pilot, Flying Officer Kelly Logue. The final overseas deployment of the squadron was in September, to Singapore, where its Skyhawks engaged in mock combats with the jet fighters of the Singaporean Air Force. No. 75 Squadron was disbanded on 13 December.

=== Service with No. 2 Squadron ===
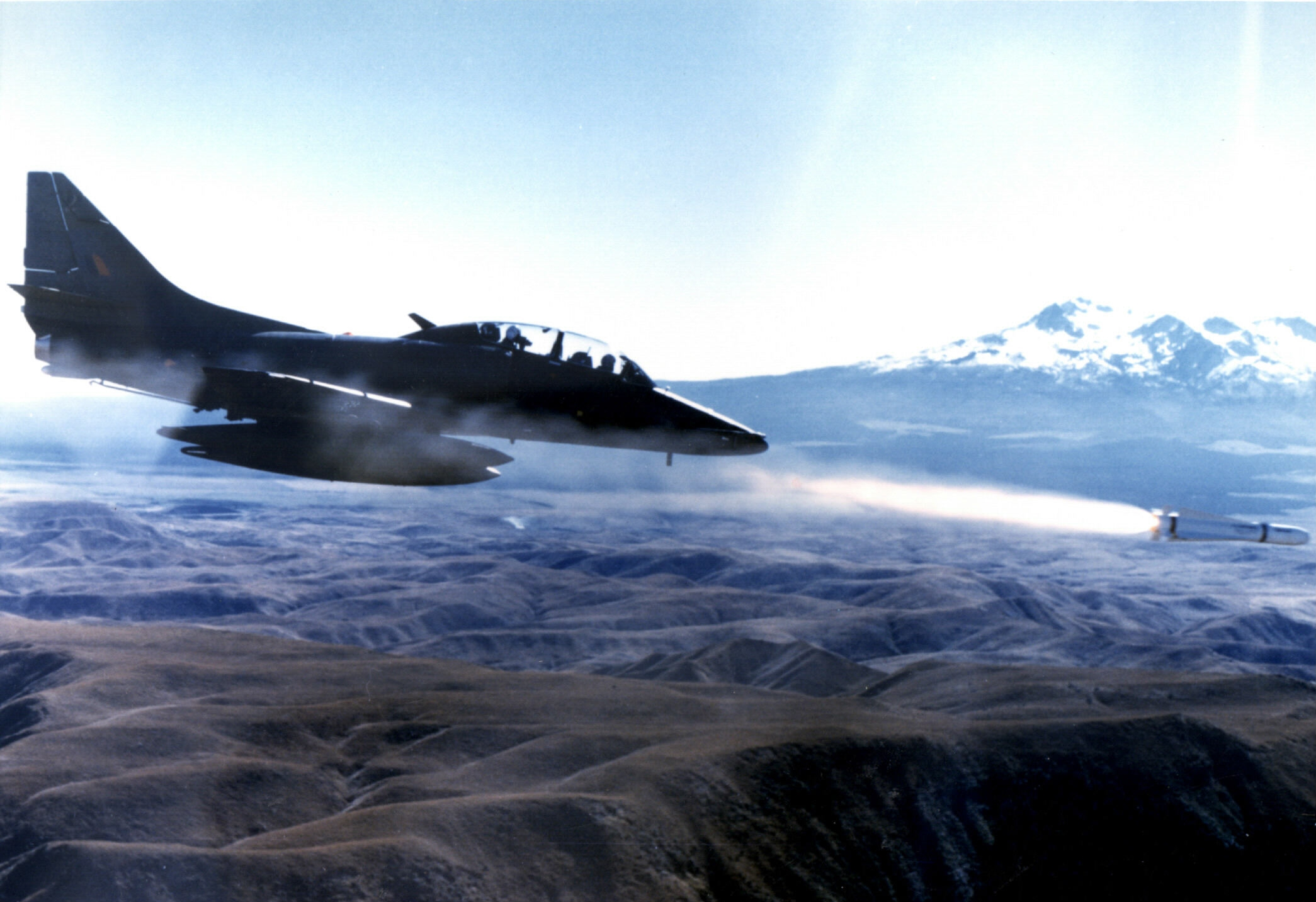
A launch of an AGM-65 Maverick missile from a TA-4K Skyhawk, the two-seater version of the aircraft, over the Waiouru Training Ground, 1989

In December 1984, due to the increased number of Skyhawks following the acquisition of the Australian aircraft earlier in the year, the RNZAF formed another squadron to begin training on the type. This was No. 2 Squadron, which was to receive eight Skyhawks while No. 75 Squadron had the remaining fourteen. The new squadron became operational in May 1986, forming part of the RNZAF's Strike Wing.

In 1989, the New Zealand Government agreed to the stationing of a RNZAF detachment in Australia to help strengthen military relations between the two countries. No. 2 Squadron moved to Australia in 1991 to commence a five-year deployment where it was to operate six Skyhawks in a training role from the Naval Air Station Nowra, in New South Wales. This was advantageous for the RNZAF, as it meant increased opportunities for cooperative training with the RAAF while for the RAN, the Skyhawks could provide the naval support lost when it had rid itself of its own fleet of the aircraft type. It would continue to operate as a conversion unit for pilots transferring to No. 75 Squadron. Although six Skyhawks were based in Australia, only five were usually operational at any given time with one kept back to be used for spares.

A posting to No. 2 Squadron was highly desirable since it was one of the few opportunities available to RNZAF personnel for deployment overseas. The squadron fulfilled its role satisfactorily and in 1996, its initial deployment at Nowra was extended by another five years. The Skyhawks continued to be used for training in maritime strike operations, often as opponents to the RAAF's F/A-18 Hornets. Along with No. 75 Squadron, it was disbanded on 13 December 2001. Due to the decline in the numbers of trained personnel, earlier in the year only four pilots were available for its then complement of five Skyhawks. Pilots from No. 75 Squadron were temporarily attached to the squadron to allow it to fulfil its final deployments within Australia.

=== Project Kahu ===
In 1983 the New Zealand Government reviewed the military role of the Skyhawks, and this saw the aircraft take on a maritime strike function. By this time, it was recognised that the Skyhawk's avionic equipment was dated and it was limited in its ability to perform both in the desired maritime strike role as well as ground attack while still being able to be used defensively. The deficiency in its electronics was increasingly apparent when training with the USAF. In 1984 a major upgrade program, designated 'Project Kahu', was agreed for the Skyhawks (Kahu was the indigenous name of the New Zealand harrier hawk).

This work, costing NZ$148 million and to be completed at the RNZAF's No. 1 Repair Depot at Woodbourne, saw the Skyhawk's avionic equipment updated with new radar, an inertial navigation system, and a heads-up display, all to make the Skyhawk more effective in an anti-shipping role. Additionally, the wings were overhauled. Its weapon carrying ability was improved to allow the use of AGM-65 Maverick missiles, suitable for both ground and sea targets. Although some work was completed by the American company Lear Siegler Inc., private companies in New Zealand were also involved, including Pacific Aerospace in Hamilton, which worked on the wings, while Fisher & Paykel did electrical work.

The upgrade work commenced in early 1986 and was completed by June 1991, with the delivery to No. 75 Squadron of the last updated Skyhawk. A drawback to the project was that much of the new electronics was bespoke equipment, which subsequently caused supply and maintenance problems that was exacerbated when the Skyhawks were deployed overseas.

=== Losses ===
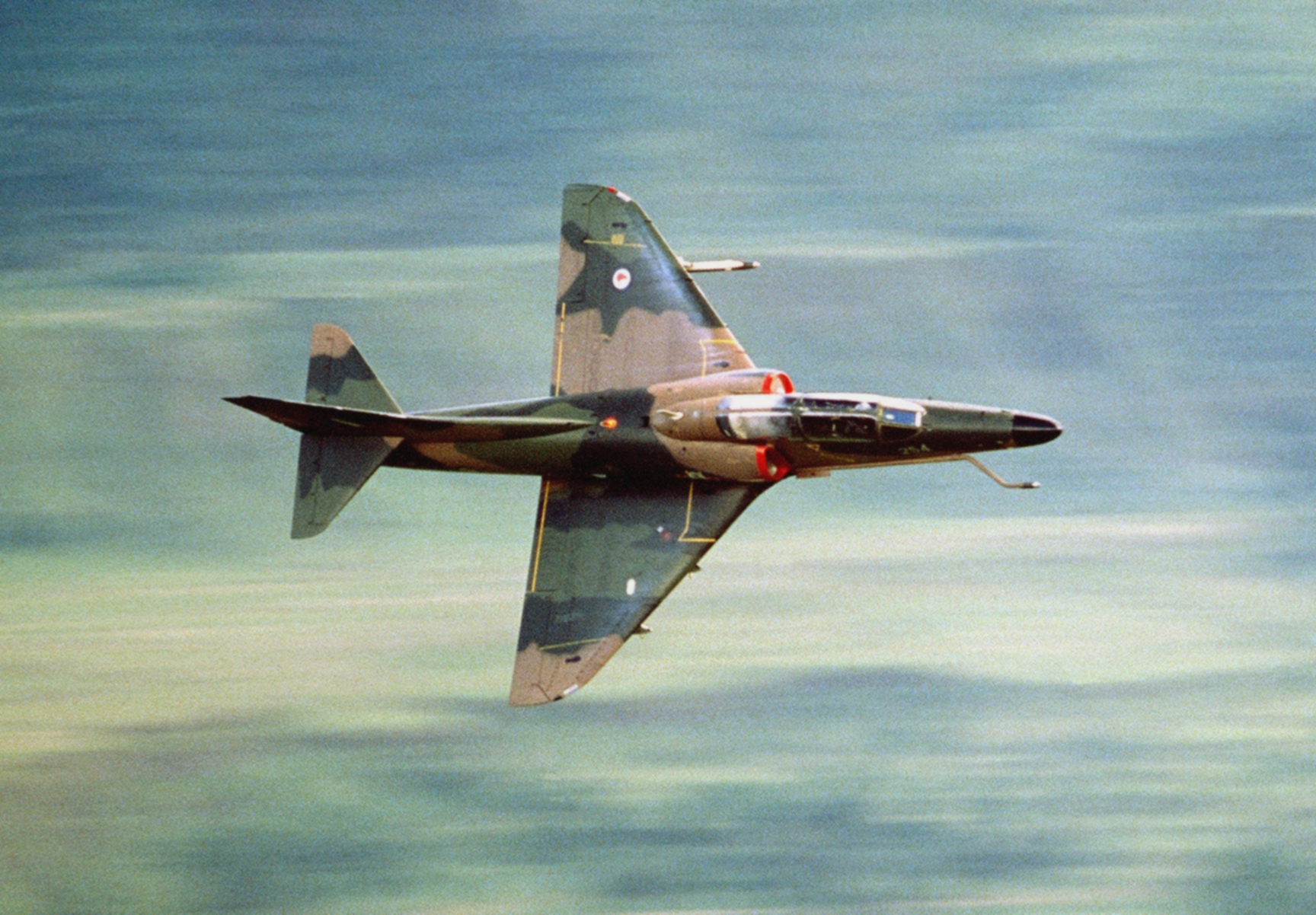
A plan view of a No. 75 Squadron TA-4K Skyhawk on the Crow Valley Electronic Warfare Tactical Range in the Philippines, during Cope Thumber 1984

A total of seven Skyhawks were lost during the course of the aircraft's service with the RNZAF. The first loss took place on 18 October 1974; on approach for a landing at Ohakea, the Skyhawk's engine suffered a major failure. The pilot ejected and the aircraft crashed in a farm paddock near the town of Bulls. The second loss, a TA-4K (NZ6253), was on 25 March 1981 during a training exercise. Making a simulated attack at low level, the pilot, flying solo, was crossing the Ruahine Range when he appeared to have misjudged his height and crashed into a ridge. Although the pilot ejected, he was too low for the parachute to open and was killed.

On 24 October 1989, two pilots of No. 75 Squadron's display team were practicing when they collided in mid-air; one Skyhawk (NZ6210) crashed into a paddock adjacent the airfield at Ohakea, killing the pilot on impact. The pilot of the other Skyhawk (NZ6211) was able to land safely and the aircraft returned to service after several months. Skyhawk NZ6208 was lost on 23 July 1992 when its engine failed while flying off the coast near Napier. The pilot safely ejected and the aircraft crashed near Herbertville. A mid-air engine failure was again the cause of the loss of another Skyhawk (NZ6203) on 30 June 1996 which, after the pilot ejected, crashed at Marton. While training in Australia on 16 February 2001 for an air display at the Avalon Airshow, the pilot of Skyhawk NZ6211, No. 2 Squadron's commanding officer, fatally struck the ground while carrying out a barrel roll while plugged in by an air refuelling hose to another Skyhawk.

The last loss of a Skyhawk (NZ6256) was on 20 March 2001 while on a training exercise over the Indian Ocean off Perth. Tasking with the defence of RAN ships from attack aircraft, the aircraft's pilot lost control during a mock dogfight with another Skyhawk. He ejected just before the aircraft crashed into the sea.

== Replacement ==
From 1998, the New Zealand Government had been assessing the potential replacement of the RNZAF's fleet of Skyhawks, now 30 years old. Late that year, it announced that they were to be replaced by 28 General Dynamics F-16 Fighting Falcons, leased from the United States for NZ$12.5 million annually for ten years with an option to purchase them at the end of the lease. The F-16s were intended to enter service with the RNZAF by 2001. Preparations to sell the Skyhawks commenced, with the Philippine Air Force a potential purchaser. However, following a change in government in late 1999, the new prime minister, Helen Clark, cancelled the deal. RNZAF staff in the United States preparing to take on the F-16s were recalled and the sale process for the Skyhawks halted.

Morale in the RNZAF immediately slumped and several Skyhawk pilots left the service, either going into the private sector or joining the air forces of other nations. This loss was exacerbated following Clark's decision in May 2001 to disband the RNZAF's Strike Wing. The two Skyhawk squadrons were disbanded later in the year.

== Disposal ==
With the disbandment of the Strike Wing, the sales process for the Skyhawks resumed. Most of the seventeen surviving aircraft were placed in storage at Woodbourne in late 2001 while four were kept at Ohakea in flying condition for demonstration purposes. In 2011, the New Zealand Government donated nine aircraft to aviation museums and put the remainder up for tender.

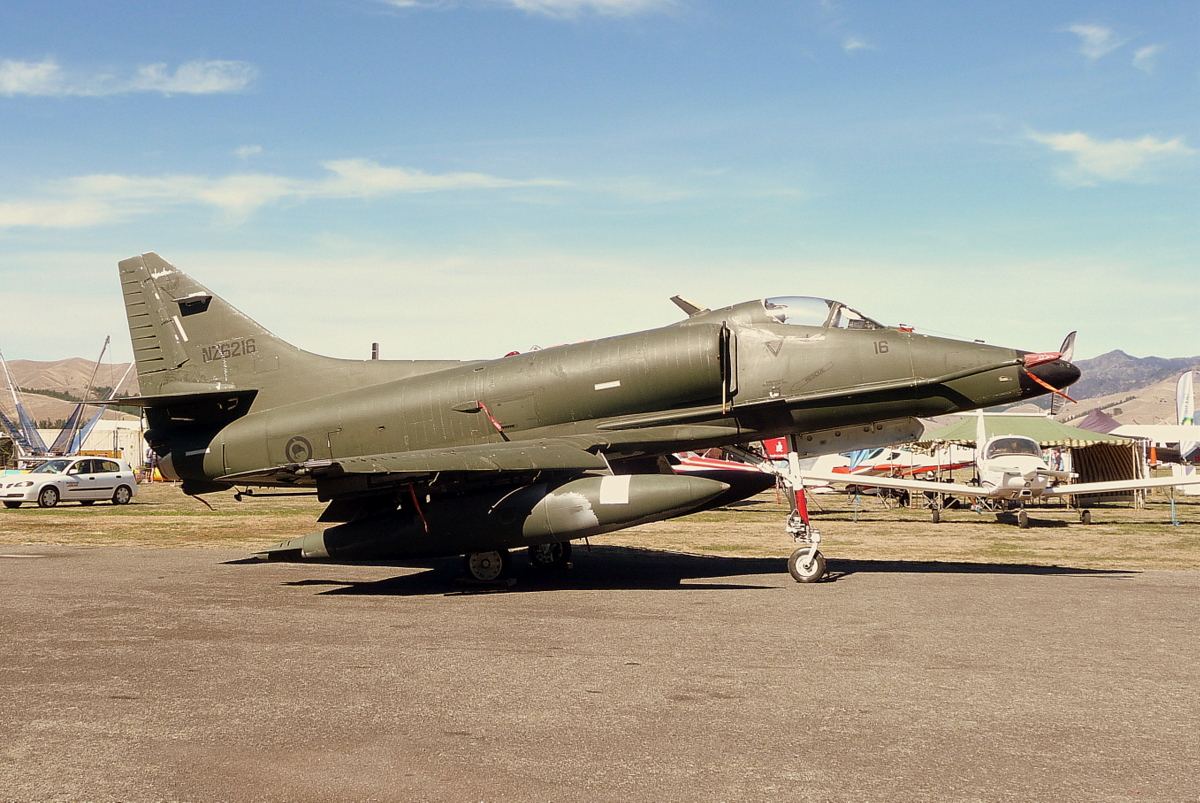
A former RNZAF Skyhawk on display at the Omaka Aviation Heritage Centre in Blenheim, New Zealand

Eight of the donated aircraft were received by the Air Force Museum of New Zealand, which displays one TA-4K (NZ6254) and two A-4Ks (NZ6205 and NZ607) at its site at Wigram Aerodrome. The remaining five were loaned to other aviation museums around the country: Classic Flyers Museum at Mount Maunganui, Ashburton Aviation Museum in Ashburton, Omaka Aviation Heritage Centre in Blenheim, and Auckland's NZ Warbirds Association and the Museum of Transport and Technology. The ninth Skyhawk (NZ6255), one of the former RAN aircraft, was donated to the Fleet Air Arm Museum in Australia, which took delivery of the aircraft in April 2012.

In 2012, Draken International signed an agreement with the New Zealand Government to purchase the eight remaining A-4K Skyhawks, as well as various other equipment and accessories. Taking delivery of the aircraft the following year, Draken flew the Skyhawks as part of its defence contract with the United States armed forces. The Skyhawks were flown as adversary aircraft against USAF and USN jet fighters such as the F/A-18 Hornet, F-22 Raptor, and F-35 Lightning II.
