= Fleet Air Arm Museum (Australia) =

Museum of the history of Australian naval aviation

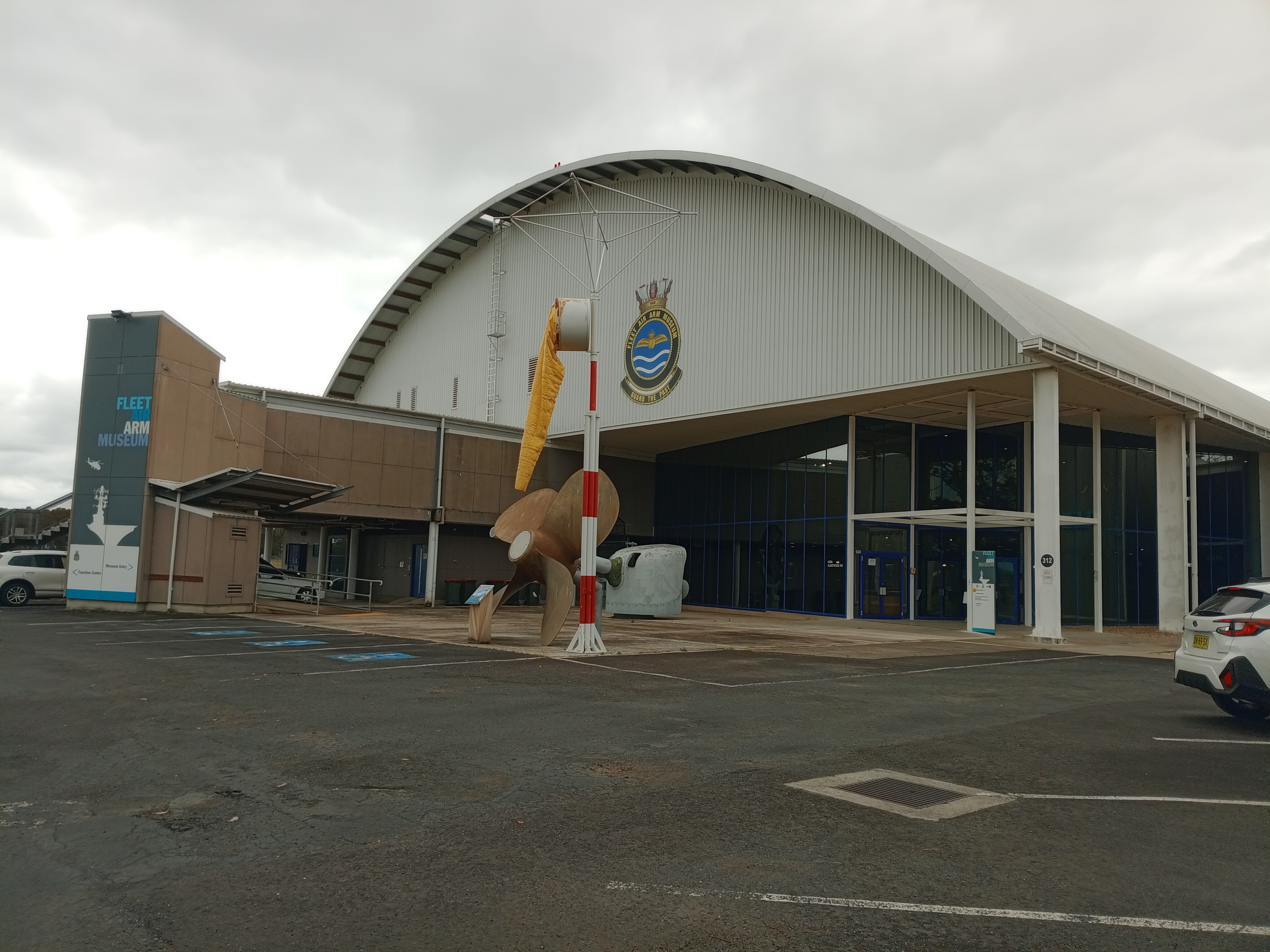
- The museum pictured in January 2026.
- Established: 1990
- Location: HMAS Albatross, Nowra, New South Wales
- Coordinates: 34.936°S 150.555°E
- Type: Military museum
- Website: http://www.navy.gov.au/fleet-air-arm-museum

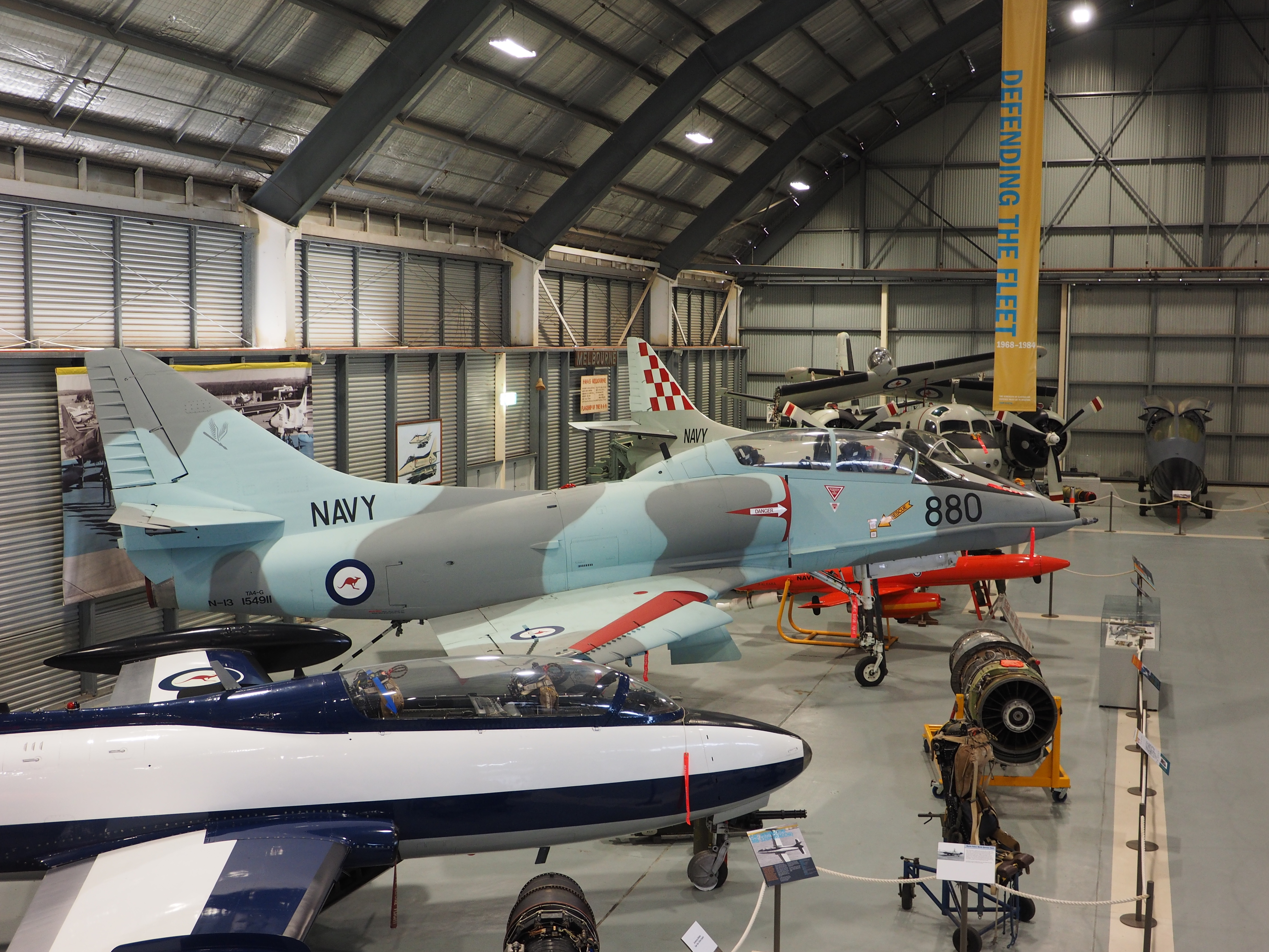
The "Defending the Fleet" section of the museum

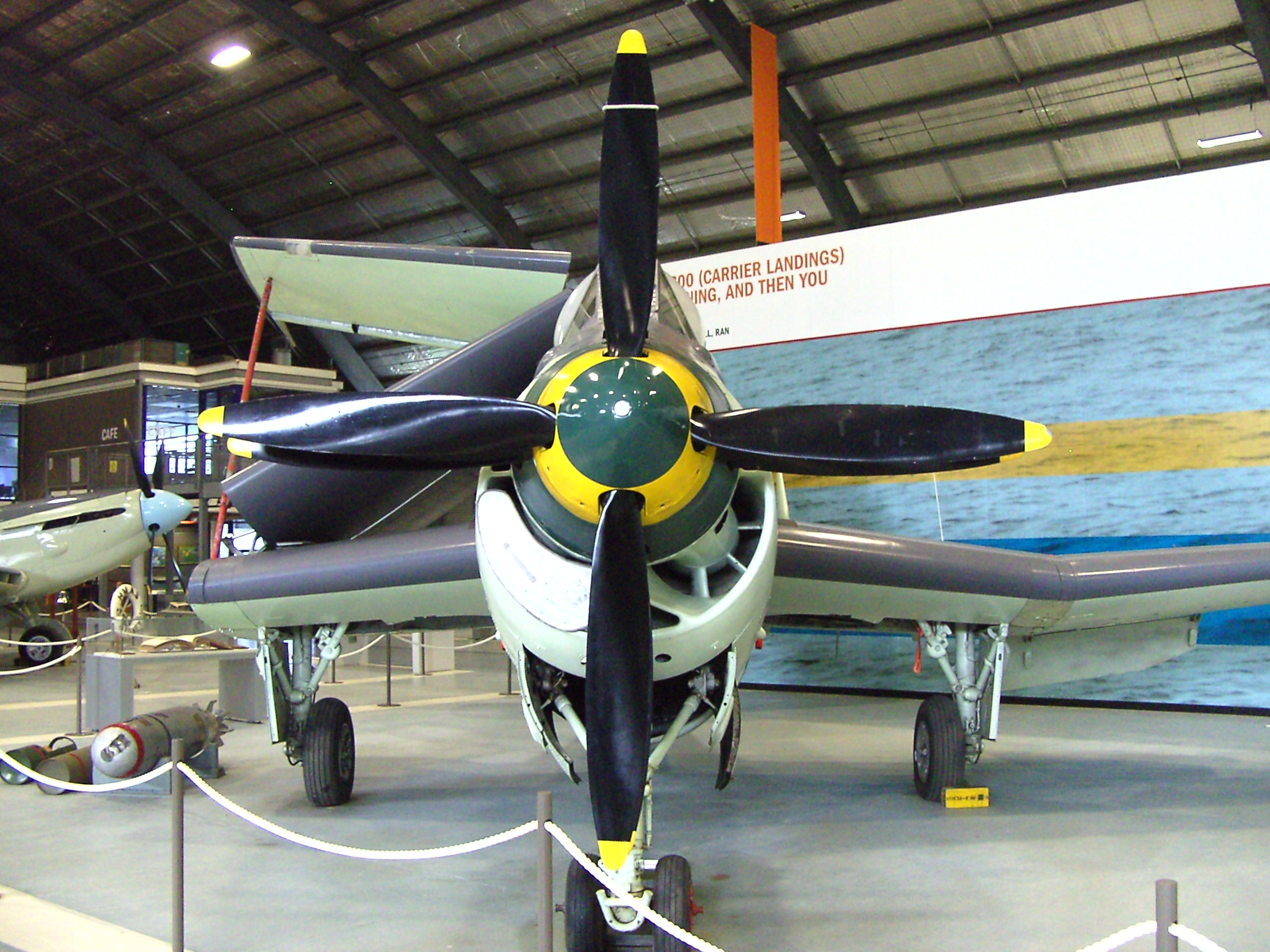
The museum's Fairey Gannet

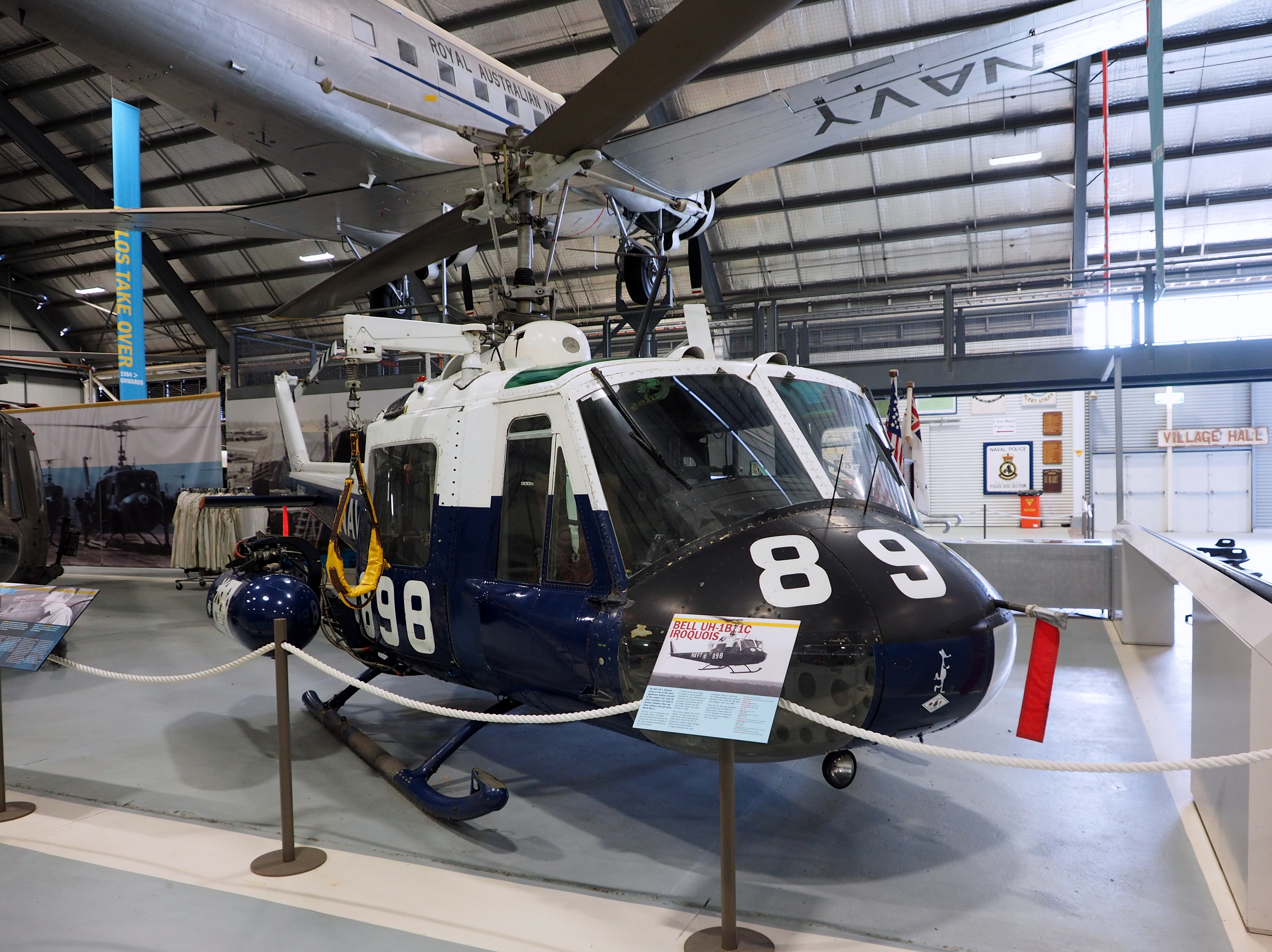
A Bell UH-1C Iroquois at the Fleet Air Arm Museum

The Australian Fleet Air Arm Museum, formerly known as Australia's Museum of Flight, is a military aerospace museum located at the naval air station HMAS Albatross, near Nowra, New South Wales. The museum was opened in 1990, although efforts to preserve artifacts related to Australia's naval aviation history began in 1974. The museum houses aircraft used throughout the history of the Fleet Air Arm, the naval aviation branch of the Royal Australian Navy (RAN), along with other aircraft of relevance to Australia's aviation history, and memorabilia relating to Australian aircraft carriers. The museum includes 34 aircraft and helicopters in its collection. It is open to the public except for major public holidays, check the website for actual opening hours. The museum building is also home to Albatross Aero Club.

== History ==
The Fleet Air Arm Museum can trace its origins to 1974 when a group of volunteers associated with the Royal Australian Navy (RAN) obtained five obsolete RAN aircraft and began work to establish a museum for display of artifacts to present the story of Australian Naval aviation. $80m were raised from various sources for a large hangar and function centre. In 1990, the Australian Naval Aviation Museum Foundation was established to operate the museum.

In September 2000, the museum was renamed Australia's Museum of Flight and its role expanded to displaying artifacts related to Australian aviation. In 2006, ownership and management of the museum were handed to the RAN and it was renamed the Fleet Air Arm Museum.

The museum now displays more than 34 aircraft and many aviation artifacts.

== Displays ==
The following exhibits are on static display in the museum:

=== Aircraft ===
- Aermacchi MB-326H
- CAC CA-22 Winjeel prototype
- de Havilland Sea Vampire T22
- de Havilland Sea Venom F.A.W. Mk 53
- Douglas C-47 Dakota
- Fairey Firefly AS.5/AS.6
- Fairey Gannet AS1/4
- Grumman S-2E/G Tracker – 2 x S-2E (static)
- GAF Jindivik – pilotless target aircraft
- Hawker Sea Fury Mk 11
- McDonnell Douglas A-4G Skyhawk
- McDonnell Douglas TA-4G Skyhawk
- N28 Kalkara target aircraft
- Sopwith Pup

=== Helicopters ===
- Aérospatiale AS350 Squirrel
- Bell UH-1C Iroquois
- Bell UH-1H Iroquois
- Bristol Sycamore HR 50/51
- Sikorsky S-70B-2 Seahawk
- Westland Scout AH-1
- Westland Sea King Mk50
- Westland Wessex Mk31B

== See also ==
- Royal Australian Navy Heritage Centre
- Royal Navy Fleet Air Arm Museum
- List of aerospace museums
