= 850 Squadron RAN =

Defunct flying squadron of the Royal Australian Navy's Fleet Air Arm

- 850 Squadron badge
- Active: 1953–1954
- Country: Australia
- Branch: Royal Australian Navy
- Type: Deployable mission squadron
- Role: Carrier-based fighter squadron
- Part of: RAN Fleet Air Arm
- Airbase: HMAS Albatross
- Mottos: vincit omnia virtus (Latin for 'Courage conquers all')

Insignia
- Squadron Badge: Azure, a dexter arm issuing from the sea proper grasping an inflamed sword with for a guard wings or and to the sinister the Souther Cross argent (1968)
- Identification Markings: 160-171 Hawker Sea Fury

850 Squadron was a naval air squadron of the Fleet Air Arm of the Royal Australian Navy (RAN). The Squadron was established for a short period after the Second World War, at HMAS Albatross, New South Wales, in January 1953 with a fleet of twelve Hawker Sea Fury fighter aircraft.

After a deployment aboard HMAS Sydney in the waters off Korea following the ceasefire in 1953, and later in Hong Kong, 850 Squadron was disbanded in August 1954.

== History ==
=== Sea Fury (1953-1954) ===
850 Squadron was formed in Australia at HMAS Albatross, New South Wales, on 12 January 1953. Equipped with Hawker Sea Fury fighter aircraft.

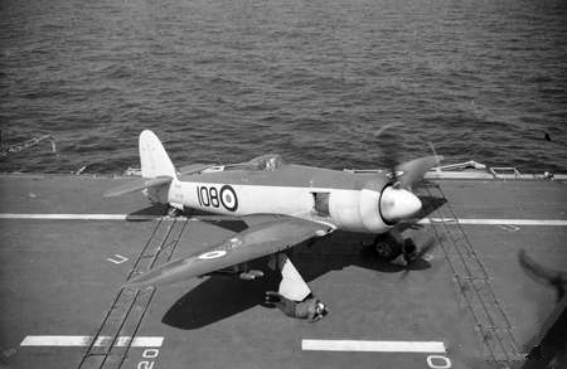
Hawker Sea Fury FB.11 on HMAS Sydney

On 17 May 1953, six Royal Australian Navy (RAN) Hawker Sea Furies departed from Forest Hill aerodrome in Wagga, for local flying exercises, intending to return to their base at Nowra. Shortly thereafter, they flew back over the aerodrome at a low altitude, where the lead aircraft collided with a civil de Havilland Tiger Moth that had just taken off for local flying practice. The Tiger Moth crashed on the aerodrome, with the pilot managing to escape serious injury. In contrast, the Hawker Sea Fury crashed two miles away, resulting in the death of its pilot, the commanding officer of 850 Squadron, Lieutenant Commander Reginald Albert Wild.

The squadron embarked in the RAN's Colossus-class light aircraft carrier HMAS Vengeance for a short period. It was later embarked in the RAN's Majestic-class light aircraft carrier HMAS Sydney during her post-Korean War patrol of Korean waters in 1953.

Following the conclusion of September 1953, during which time was spent working up aboard the aircraft carrier HMAS Sydney, the carrier sailed from Fremantle on 27 October 1953. The ceasefire that took effect in July 1953 suggested that HMAS Sydney's second deployment to Korea would be relatively uneventful. Nevertheless, tragedy struck when Sub Lieutenant Michael Beardsall, RN, a pilot from 850 Squadron, lost his life when his Hawker Sea Fury crashed into the ocean approximately 15 kilometres (9.3 mi) ahead of the ship on 29 December 1953. Additionally, the Squadron experienced the loss of another aircraft on 15 March 1954, when Lieutenant John Brettingham-Moore was forced to ditch into the sea; fortunately, he emerged unscathed.

The Squadron operated briefly out of Hong Kong before returning to Australia in early 1954 where It was then disbanded on 3 August 1954.

== Aircraft operated ==
The squadron operated a single aircraft type:

- Hawker Sea Fury FB.11 fighter-bomber (January 1953 - August 1954)

== Naval air stations ==
- HMAS Albatross, New South Wales (12 January - 2 July 1953)
- HMAS Vengeance (2 July - 9 September 1953)
- HMAS Albatross, New South Wales (9 - 21 September 1953)
- HMAS Sydney (21 September 1953 - 10 June 1954)
  - RAF Kai Tak, Hong Kong (Detachment six aircraft 2 - 4 November 1953)
  - Iwakuni, Japan (Detachment six aircraft 19 - 25 November 1953)
  - RAF Kai Tak, Hong Kong (Detachment four aircraft 31 December 1953 - 31 January 1954)
- HMAS Albatross, New South Wales (10 June - 3 September 1954)
- disbanded - (3 September 1954)

== Commanding officers ==
List of commanding officers of 850 Squadron with date of appointment:

- Lieutenant Commander R.A. Wilds, DFC, RN, from 12 January 1953 (KiFA 17 May 1953)
- Lieutenant Commander P.M. Austin, RN, from 18 May 1953
- disbanded - 3 September 1954

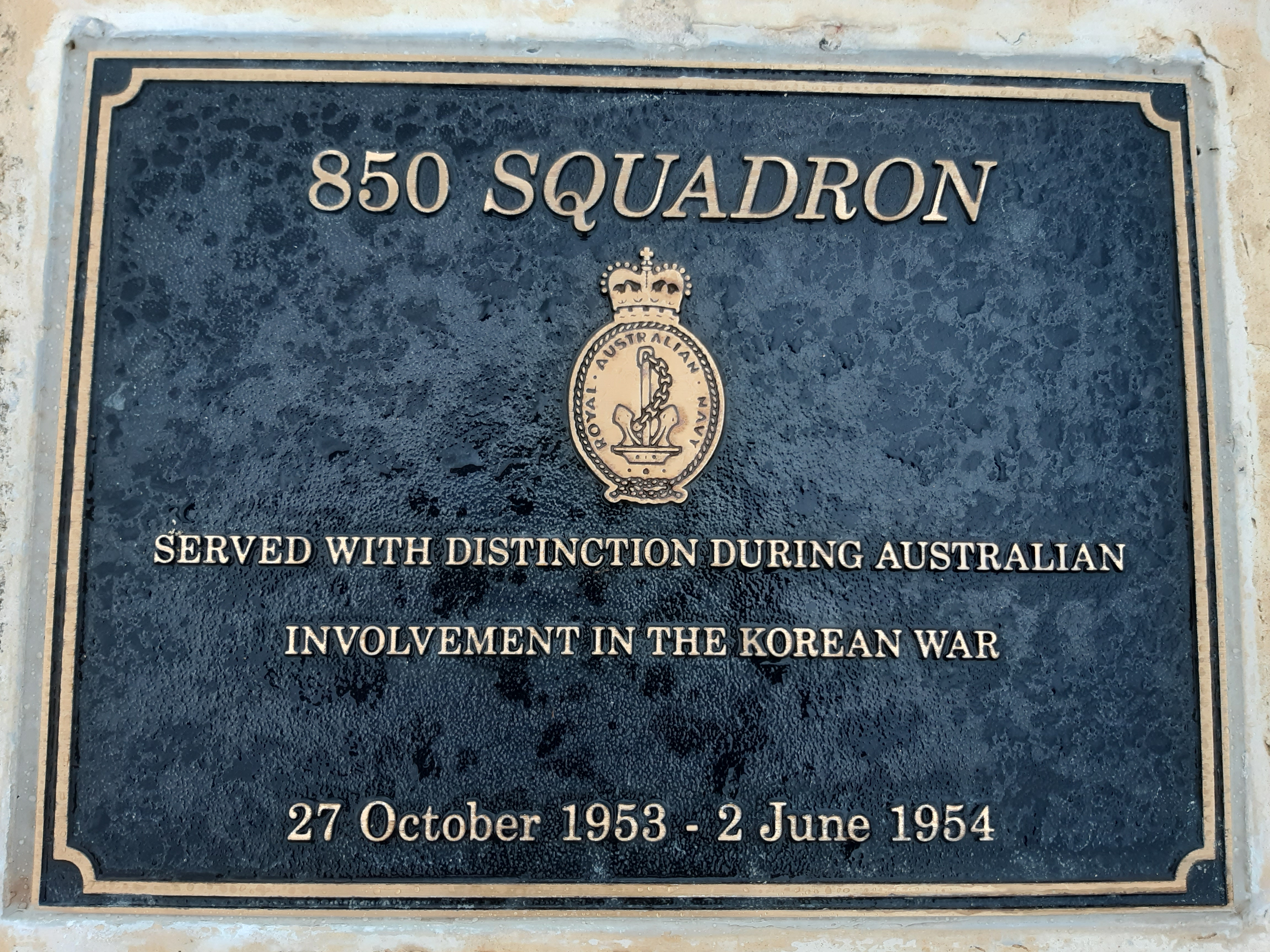
Rockingham Naval Memorial Park, Western Australia: Commemorative plaque for 850 Squadron RAN

== See also ==
- 850 Naval Air Squadron
