= List of Australian Fleet Air Arm flying squadrons =

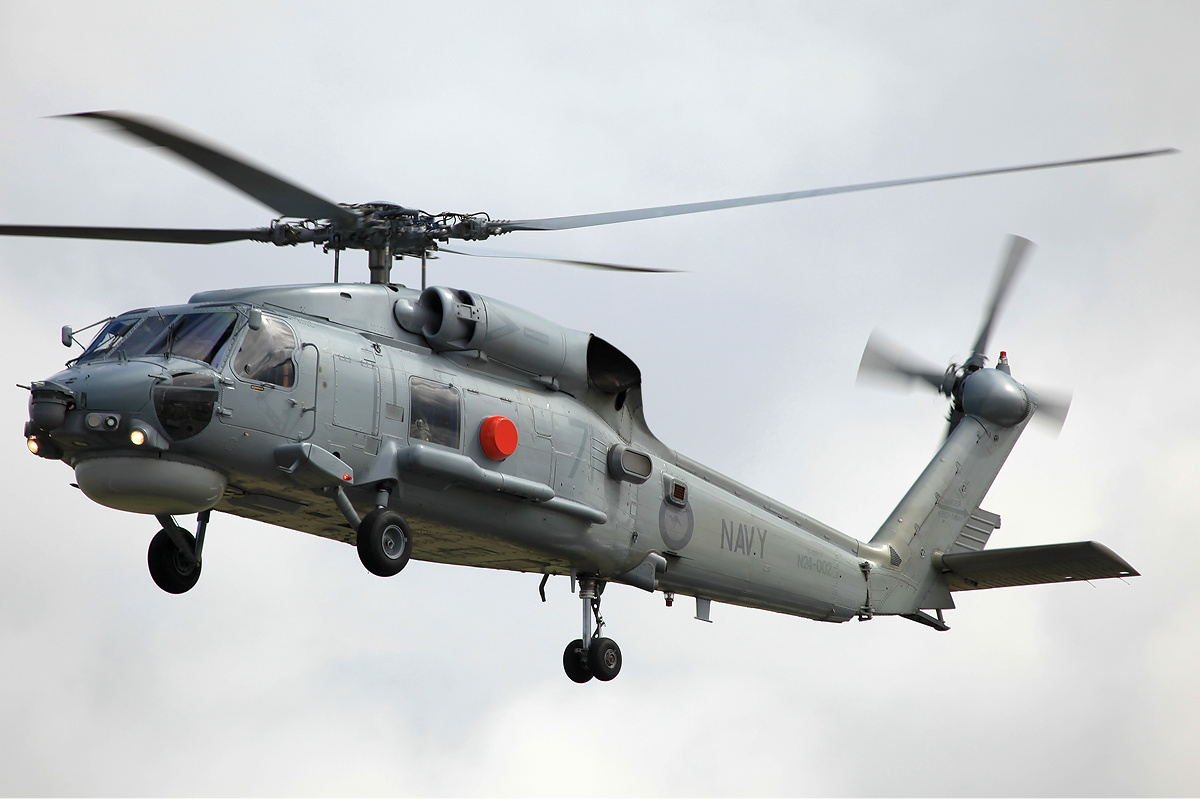
An 816 Squadron S-70B-2 Seahawk in 2011

This is a list of Royal Australian Navy Fleet Air Arm flying squadrons. The Fleet Air Arm was founded in 1947. Since then the Royal Australian Navy has formed a number of squadrons which have operated a range of fixed-wing aircraft and helicopters from aircraft carriers, other warships, and shore establishments.

== Squadrons ==
Naval air squadrons are organised into various series based on their operating types. The 700 to 799 series is dedicated to training, while the 800 to 899 series focuses on deployable operations.

Within the Royal Australian Navy, the 800 series naval air squadrons manage smaller units known as Flights. These Flights are identified by a numbering system that uses the last digit of their parent squadron's number as a prefix. For example, 601 to 607 Flight is associated with 816 Squadron, 801 to 807 Flight is linked to 808 Squadron, and 201 to 203 Flight is part of 822X Squadron. This structure allows for efficient organisation and deployment of air assets within the naval framework.

Table of Royal Australian Navy Fleet Air Arm flying squadrons - note: BOLD squadron text denotes an active squadron
Squadron	Aircraft	Role	Notes
Front-line squadrons
805 Squadron RAN	-	-	-
808 Squadron RAN	MH-60R Seahawk	anti-submarine warfare (ASW); Anti-surface warfare (ASuW); Vertical replenishment (VERTREP); Passenger and cargo transfer; Search and rescue (SAR)	
816 Squadron RAN	MH-60R Seahawk	anti-submarine warfare (ASW); Anti-surface warfare (ASuW); Vertical replenishment (VERTREP); Passenger and cargo transfer; Search and rescue (SAR)	
817 Squadron RAN	-	-	-
822X Squadron RAN	Insitu ScanEagle; Camcopter S-100	Unmanned Aerial Systems	
850 Squadron RAN	-	-	-
851 Squadron RAN	-	-	-
Training squadrons
723 Squadron RAN	EC-135 T2+	Helicopter aircrew training and was parent to Royal Australian Navy Helicopter Flight Vietnam	
724 Squadron RAN	-	-	-
725 Squadron RAN	MH-60R Seahawk	Conversion type training	

== See also ==
- List of Royal Australian Air Force aircraft squadrons
- List of Australian Army aviation units
