= List of Royal Australian Air Force aircraft squadrons =

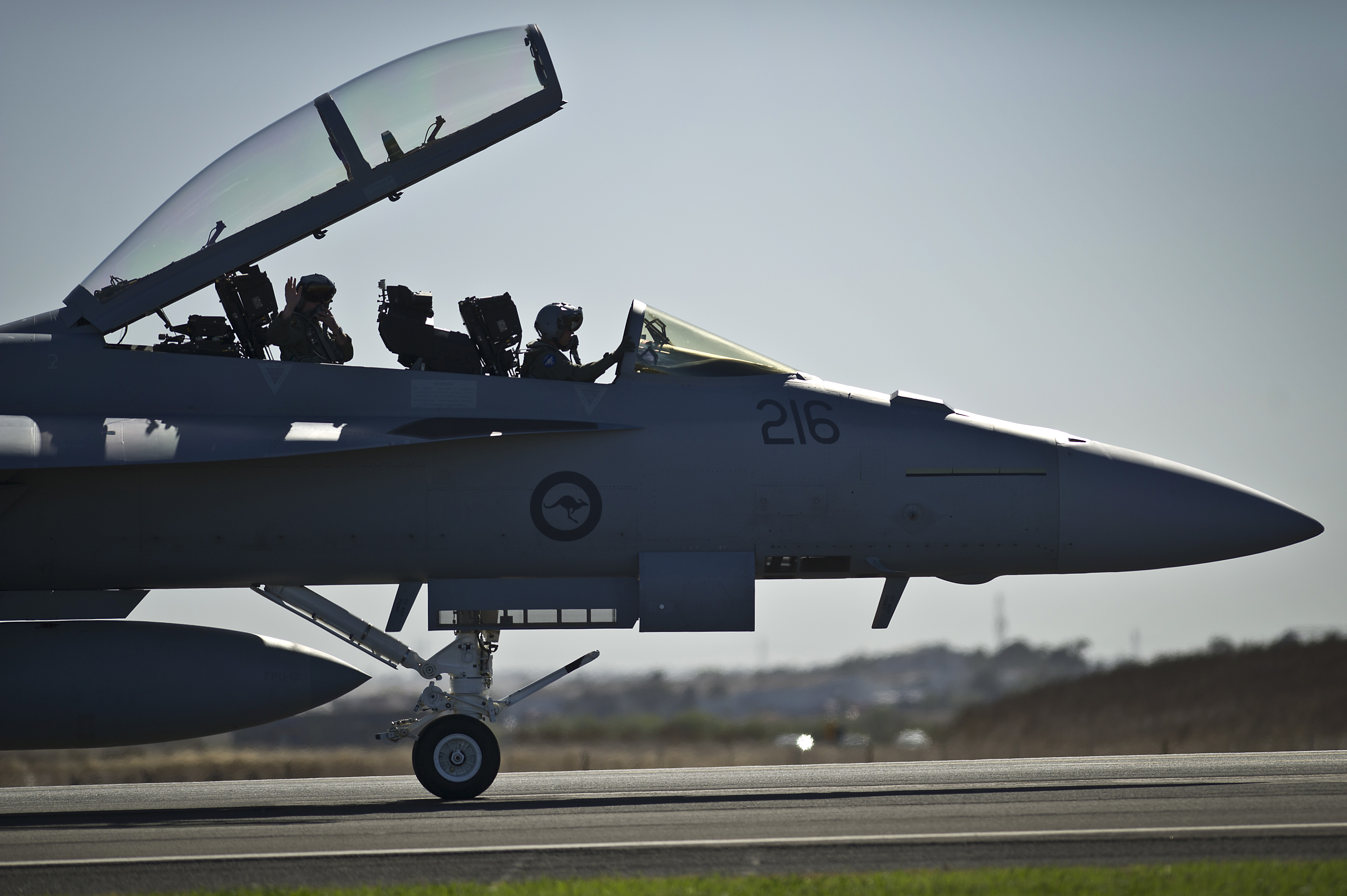
F/A-18F Super Hornet of No. 1 Squadron, 2013

This is a list of Royal Australian Air Force aircraft squadrons. The Royal Australian Air Force (RAAF) was formed in 1921 and traces its lineage to the previous Australian Flying Corps that served during World War I. The list also includes those squadrons that were under Australian and British operational control during World War II, and squadrons that were operated jointly by the RAAF and the Netherlands East Indies.

== Squadrons ==
=== RAAF units formed under Australian operational control ===
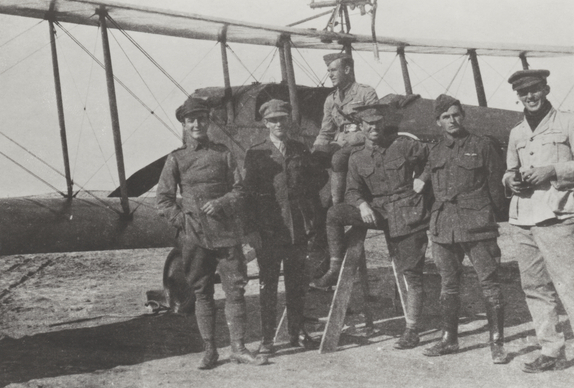
Members of C Flight, No. 1 Squadron, including Lieutenant McNamara (left), Captain Williams (third from right) and Lieutenant Wackett (right), in front of a Martinsyde near the Suez Canal, Egypt, 1917

- No. 1 Squadron RAAF
- No. 2 Squadron RAAF
- No. 3 Squadron RAAF
- No. 4 Squadron RAAF
- No. 5 Squadron RAAF
- No. 6 Squadron RAAF
- No. 7 Squadron RAAF
- No. 8 Squadron RAAF
- No. 9 Squadron RAAF
- No. 10 Squadron RAAF
- No. 11 Squadron RAAF
- No. 12 Squadron RAAF
- No. 13 Squadron RAAF
- No. 14 Squadron RAAF
- No. 15 Squadron RAAF
- No. 17 Squadron RAAF
- No. 20 Squadron RAAF
- No. 21 Squadron RAAF
- No. 22 Squadron RAAF
- No. 23 Squadron RAAF
- No. 24 Squadron RAAF
- No. 25 Squadron RAAF
- No. 26 Squadron RAAF
- No. 27 Squadron RAAF
- No. 28 Squadron RAAF
- No. 29 Squadron RAAF
- No. 30 Squadron RAAF
- No. 31 Squadron RAAF
- No. 32 Squadron RAAF
- No. 33 Squadron RAAF
- No. 34 Squadron RAAF
- No. 35 Squadron RAAF
- No. 36 Squadron RAAF
- No. 37 Squadron RAAF
- No. 38 Squadron RAAF
- No. 40 Squadron RAAF
- No. 41 Squadron RAAF
- No. 42 Squadron RAAF
- No. 43 Squadron RAAF
- No. 60 Squadron RAAF
- No. 66 Squadron RAAF
- No. 67 Squadron RAAF
- No. 68 Squadron RAAF –Reconnaissance based at Kojarena, WA – flew Avro Ansons
- No. 69 Squadron RAAF – Reconnaissance based at Georgina, WA – flew Avro Ansons
- No. 71 Squadron RAAF
- No. 73 Squadron RAAF
- No. 75 Squadron RAAF
- No. 76 Squadron RAAF
- No. 77 Squadron RAAF
- No. 78 Squadron RAAF
- No. 79 Squadron RAAF
- No. 80 Squadron RAAF
- No. 82 Squadron RAAF
- No. 83 Squadron RAAF
- No. 84 Squadron RAAF
- No. 85 Squadron RAAF
- No. 86 Squadron RAAF
- No. 87 Squadron RAAF
- No. 88 Squadron RAAF
- No. 92 Squadron RAAF
- No. 93 Squadron RAAF
- No. 94 Squadron RAAF
- No. 99 Squadron RAAF
- No. 100 Squadron RAAF
- No. 102 Squadron RAAF
- No. 107 Squadron RAAF
- No. 292 Squadron RAAF
- RAAF Squadron Berlin Air Lift
- Fighter Squadron RAAF
- Rescue and Communication Squadron RAAF
- Seaplane Squadron RAAF
- RAAF University Squadrons

=== RAAF Empire Air Training Scheme Squadrons ===
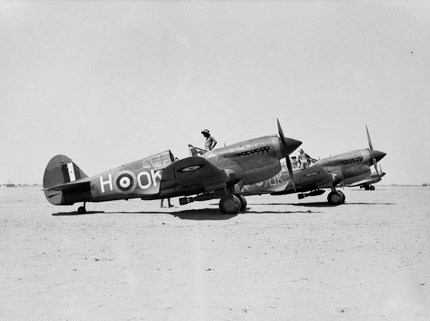
Kittyhawks from No. 450 Squadron, in North Africa during August 1942

- No. 450 Squadron RAAF
- No. 451 Squadron RAAF
- No. 452 Squadron RAAF
- No. 453 Squadron RAAF
- No. 454 Squadron RAAF
- No. 455 Squadron RAAF
- No. 456 Squadron RAAF
- No. 457 Squadron RAAF
- No. 458 Squadron RAAF
- No. 459 Squadron RAAF
- No. 460 Squadron RAAF
- No. 461 Squadron RAAF
- No. 462 Squadron RAAF
- No. 463 Squadron RAAF
- No. 464 Squadron RAAF
- No. 466 Squadron RAAF
- No. 467 Squadron RAAF

=== Joint RAAF-Netherlands East Indies Squadrons ===
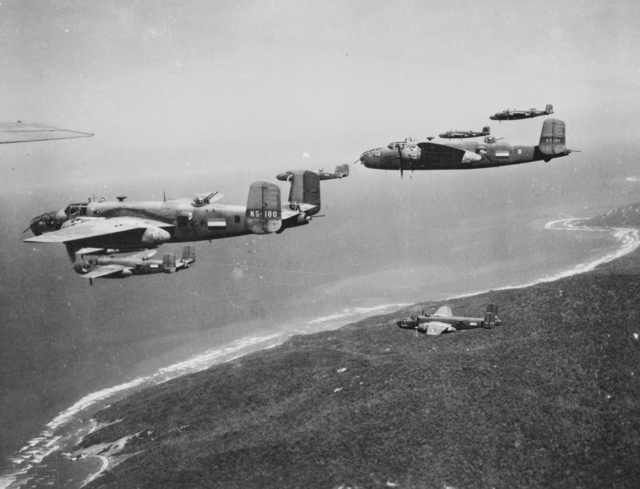
B-25 Mitchell bombers from No. 18 (NEI) Squadron flying in formation near Darwin in 1943

- No. 18 (NEI) Squadron (bomber)
- No. 19 (NEI) Squadron (transport/communications)
- No. 119 (NEI) Squadron (bomber)
- No. 120 (NEI) Squadron (fighter)

== See also ==
- List of Australian Fleet Air Arm flying squadrons
- List of Australian Army aviation units
- List of Royal Australian Air Force independent aircraft flights
- List of Royal Australian Air Force wings
