= 851 Squadron RAN =

Defunct flying squadron of the Royal Australian Navy's Fleet Air Arm

851 Squadron
- 851 Squadron badge
- Active: 1954–1958; 1968–1984
- Country: Australia
- Branch: Royal Australian Navy
- Type: Deployable mission squadron
- Role: Anti-submarine warfare training; Fleet Requirements Unit (FRU); Communications
- Part of: Fleet Air Arm (RAN)
- Airbase: HMAS Albatross
- Motto: Be forthright

Insignia
- Squadron Badge: Sable, a spiked mace palewise argent winged or (1968)
- Identification Markings: 260-272 Fairey Firefly; VJ-ORA and VJ-ORB Douglas C-47, later 800-801; 800-801 HS-748; 840-859 Grumman Tracker

851 Squadron was a naval air squadron of the Fleet Air Arm of the Royal Australian Navy (RAN). The squadron operated over two distinct periods, initially between 1954 and 1958 and then between 1968 and 1984, mainly in an anti-submarine warfare training and as well later in transport roles and a Fleet Requirements Unit, predominantly based at HMAS Albatross, New South Wales. It initially flew Fairey Firefly and Douglas Dakota C-47B, these were later replaced with Grumman Tracker and HS-748.

== History ==
=== Anti-submarine warfare training (1954–1958) ===
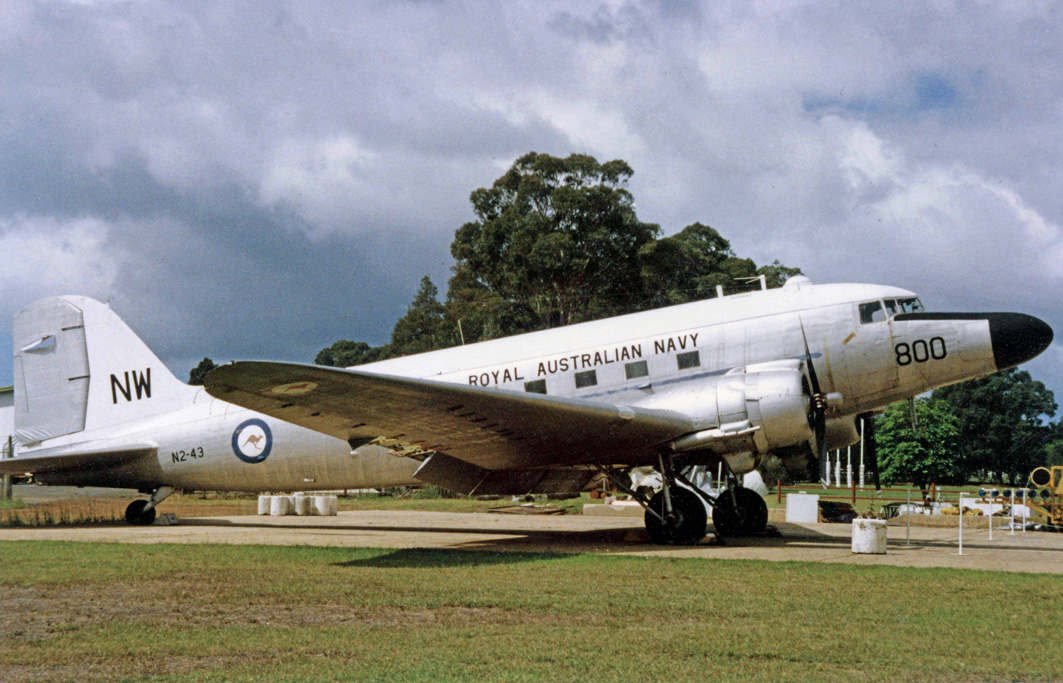
Douglas C-47 Dakota of 851 Squadron after retirement. It has the nose radar of a de Havilland Sea Venom for training purposes

851 Squadron was formed at HMAS Albatross based at RANAS Nowra, New South Wales as a land-based training and fleet support squadron on 3 August 1954.

Its first commanding officer was Lieutenant D. Johns and it was initially equipped with Fairey Firefly T.Mk 5 training aircraft and AS.Mk 6 anti-submarine warfare aircraft along with Douglas C-47 Dakota military transport aircraft. It was tasked primarily with training pilots and observers on the Firefly, and in this role the squadron's Dakotas were used as an observer training platform; they were also used to provide a transport and communications capability. Throughout March 1956 the squadron was embarked in the Majestic-class light aircraft carrier HMAS Sydney, however, this was the squadron's only stint at sea as it was confined mainly to its training role. The squadron was disbanded on 13 January 1958 following the reduction of the Royal Australian Navy's aircraft carrier fleet, which reduced the Navy's training requirements.

=== Anti-submarine warfare training, FRU and Communications (1968–1984) ===
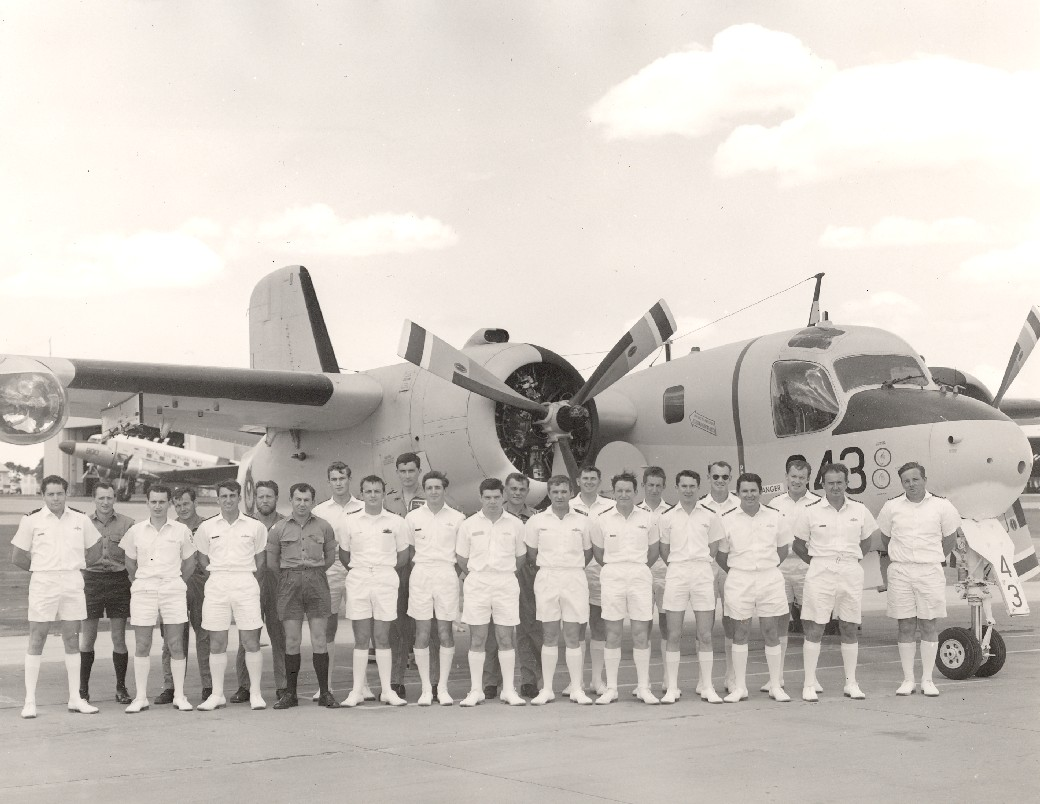
Members of 851 Squadron with a S-2E Tracker aircraft in 1968

It remained off the order of battle until it was re-formed at Nowra as a training and transport unit on 2 September 1968, equipped with Dakotas and Grumman Trackers. It also operated in the VIP and fleet requirements roles, with the latter role sometimes seeing the squadron undertake search and rescue tasks, as well as patrolling the Bass Strait to maintain security around the economically important oil facilities there. A detachment was also sent to operate out of Darwin and Broome, to undertake fishery protection patrols. The Dakotas were replaced by Hawker-Siddeley 748s in 1973.

After a hangar fire at Nowra in December 1967, which resulted in the destruction of the majority of the S-2E Trackers, the squadron transitioned to S-2G aircraft starting in May 1977. In July 1982, the squadron incorporated the Trackers from 816 Squadron, but ultimately disbanded on 31 August 1984. Two HS-748s were reassigned to 723 Squadron, and the remaining Trackers were sold.

== Aircraft operated ==
The squadron operated the following aircraft:

- Fairey Firefly T.Mk 5 training aircraft (August 1954 – February 1957)
- Fairey Firefly AS.Mk 6 anti-submarine warfare aircraft (August 1954 – January 1958)
- Douglas Dakota C-47B military transport aircraft (August 1954 – January 1958, September 1968 – September 1973)
- Grumman S-2E Tracker anti-submarine warfare aircraft (September 1968 – May 1977)
- Grumman S-2G Tracker anti-submarine warfare aircraft (May 1977 – June 1984
- Hawker-Siddeley 748 airliner (June 1973 – June 1984).

== Naval air stations ==
- HMAS Albatross, New South Wales (3 September 1954 - 13 March 1956)
- HMAS Sydney (13 - 30 March 1956)
- HMAS Albatross, New South Wales (30 March 1956 - 13 January 1958)
- disbanded - (13 January 1958)
- HMAS Albatross, New South Wales (2 September 1968 - 31 September 1984)
  - RAAF Base Darwin, Northern Territory (Detachment 26 December 1974 - 10 January 1975)
  - Broome International Airport, Western Australia (Detachment three aircraft February - May 1975)
  - Broome International Airport, Western Australia (Detachments Jul7 1975 - December 1980)
  - RAAF Base Darwin, Northern Territory (Detachment November 1977)
- disbanded - (31 September 1984)

== See also ==
- 851 Naval Air Squadron, RN
- List of Australian Fleet Air Arm flying squadrons
