= List of Australian Army aviation units =

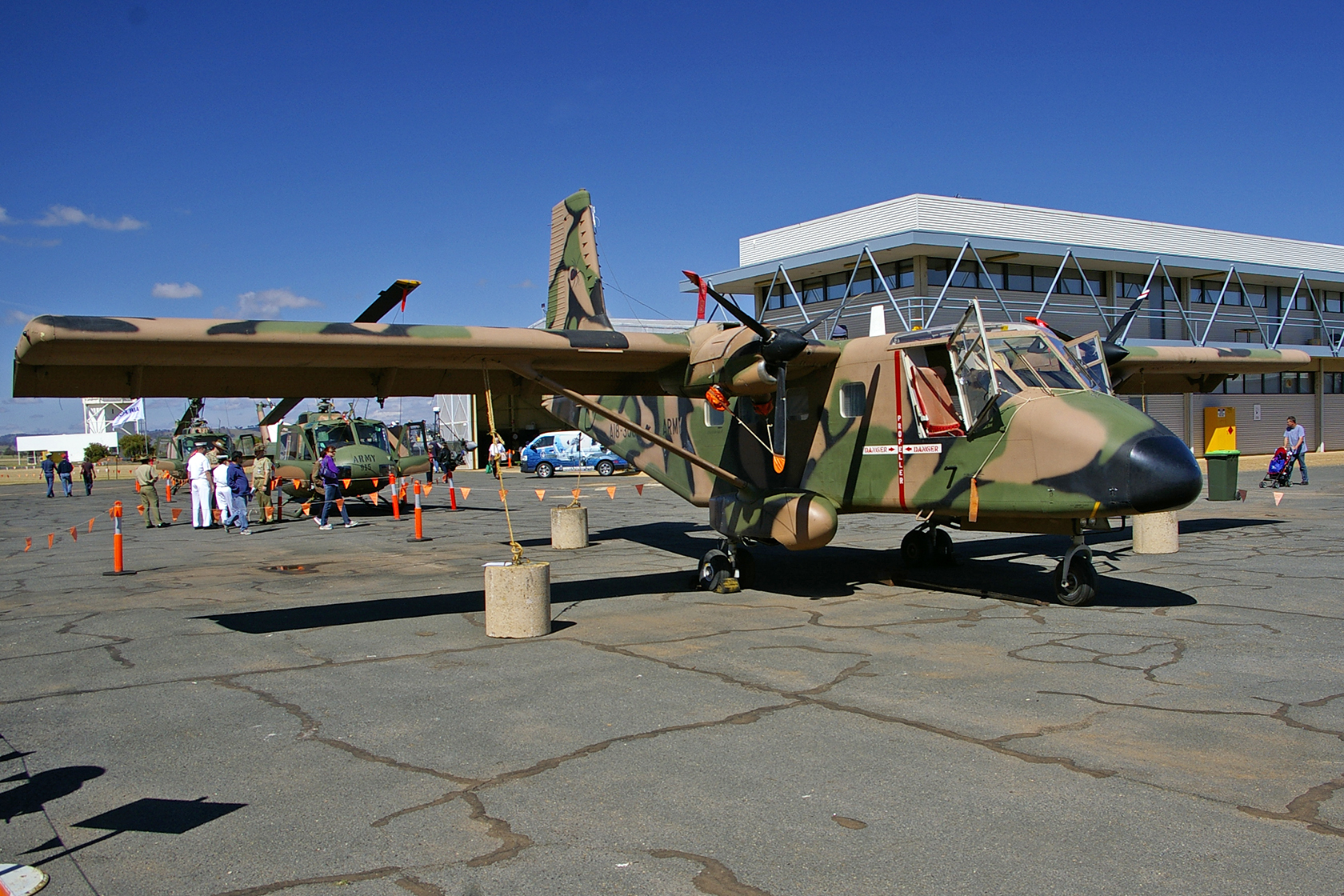
Australian Army GAF Nomad at Wagga Wagga.

This is a list of Australian Army aviation units. (Note: The Australian Flying Corps was formed as part of the Army in 1912 but later became a separate service, with the Royal Australian Air Force (RAAF) being formed in 1921. As such these units are not included in this list.) The Australian Army Aviation Corps was formed in 1968, initially with the assistance of the RAAF. These units have been utilised in a variety of roles including surveillance, reconnaissance and utility / transport, and have operated a variety of helicopters and fixed wing aircraft. More recently Unmanned Aerial Vehicles (UAVs) have been introduced into service and are operated by the Royal Australian Artillery.

== Units ==
=== Joint Army-RAAF units ===
- No. 16 Air Observation Post Flight RAAF (RAAF unit with large Army component formed in 1953, absorbed into the 16th Army Light Aircraft Squadron)
- 1st Army Aviation Company (comprised pilots only flying charted civilian aircraft formed in 1957, absorbed into the 16th Army Light Aircraft Squadron)
- No. 16 Army Light Aircraft Squadron (joint Army / RAAF unit formed in 1960, became the 1st Aviation Regiment)

=== Army aviation regiments and brigades ===
- 16th Aviation Brigade (non-flying headquarters)
  - 1st Aviation Regiment
    - 161st Squadron
    - 162nd Squadron
  - 5th Aviation Regiment
    - A Squadron
    - B Squadron
    - C Squadron
  - 6th Aviation Regiment
    - 171st Special Operations Aviation Squadron
    - 173rd Special Operations Aviation Squadron

=== Independent Army aviation flights and squadrons ===
- 161st Independent Reconnaissance Flight (formed in 1965 and served in Vietnam, later became part of the 1st Aviation Regiment)
- 183rd Independent Reconnaissance Flight (Papua & New Guinea) (Formed at RAAF Amberley in 1968 and deployed to Lae PNG to replace a Detachment of two C180 aircraft based at Port Moresby since 1965. A mixed fixed and rotary wing unit it was disbanded in 1976 after PNG gained independence)

=== Units operating UAVs ===
- 20th Surveillance and Target Acquisition Regiment, Royal Australian Artillery

=== Training units ===
- Australian Army Aviation Training Centre
  - Australian School of Army Aviation
  - Australian Army Helicopter School
- Australian Defence Force Helicopter School

== See also ==
- List of Royal Australian Air Force aircraft squadrons
- List of Australian Fleet Air Arm flying squadrons

== Notes ==
Footnotes

Citations
