= 805 Squadron RAN =

Defunct flying squadron of the Royal Australian Navy's Fleet Air Arm

- Ship's badge for 805 Squadron RAN
- Active: 28 August 1948–26 March 1958; 31 March 1958–30 June 1963; 10 January 1968–2 July 1982; 24 November 2000–26 June 2008
- Country: Australia
- Branch: Royal Australian Navy
- Type: Front line squadron
- Role: Fleet Fighter squadron; Fleet Helicopter squadron
- Part of: Fleet Air Arm
- Mottos: Over Sea and Sand
- Engagements: Korean War
- Battle honours: Korea 1951–52

Insignia
- Squadron Badge Description: Per fess barry wavy of four argent and azure, base or two palm trees proper (1972)

Aircraft flown
- Fighter: Hawker Sea Fury; de Havilland Sea Venom; McDonnell Douglas A-4G Skyhawk
- Multirole helicopter: Kaman SH-2G Super Seasprite

805 Squadron was a Royal Australian Navy (RAN) Fleet Air Arm (formerly Australian Navy Aviation Group) naval air squadron. It was last re-established in 2001 to operate the Kaman Super Seasprite as a replacement for helicopters currently in service, but problems with the helicopters saw the project cancelled and the squadron disbanded in 2008.

805 Squadron has its origins in the United Kingdom's Royal Navy (RN) where it was 805 Naval Air Squadron of the Fleet Air Arm in 1940 and operating for the duration of World War II in both the Mediterranean and Pacific theatres. 805 Squadron was reformed as a unit of the Royal Australian Navy in 1948, and operated from Australian aircraft carriers until 1982, having the distinction of being the last fast jet squadron in the RAN.

== History ==
=== Royal Australian Navy ===
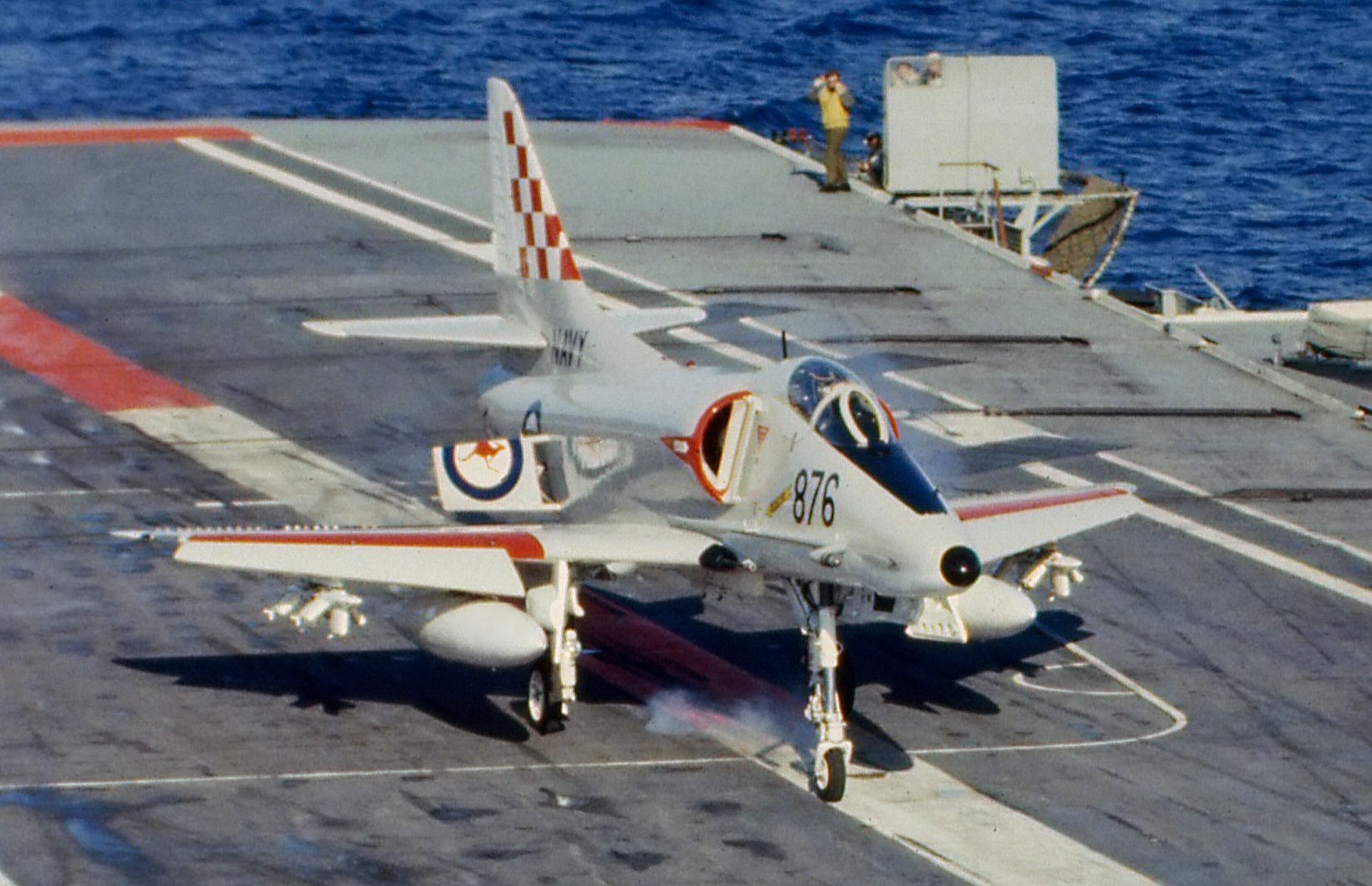
An 805 Squadron McDonnell Douglas A-4G Skyhawk landing on HMAS Melbourne in 1980

In August 1948, 805 Squadron was reformed as a Royal Australian Navy FAA squadron operating Hawker Sea Fury Mk II aircraft. The Squadron formed part of the 20th Carrier Air Group embarked on HMAS Sydney. During September 1951, 805 Squadron deployed to Korea, flying sorties for 64 days. Three 805 Squadron pilots were killed during the campaign. The battle honour "Korea 1951–52" was awarded to the squadron for this deployment. Following the retirement of the Sea Fury aircraft, the unit was disbanded on 26 March 1958.

805 Squadron reformed at Nowra on 31 March 1958, equipped with de Havilland Sea Venom FAW.53 all weather night fighters. 805 Squadron later embarked on HMAS Melbourne, as part of the 21st Carrier Air Group. The squadron was again disbanded on 30 June 1963 and its aircraft transferred to B Flight, 816 Squadron.

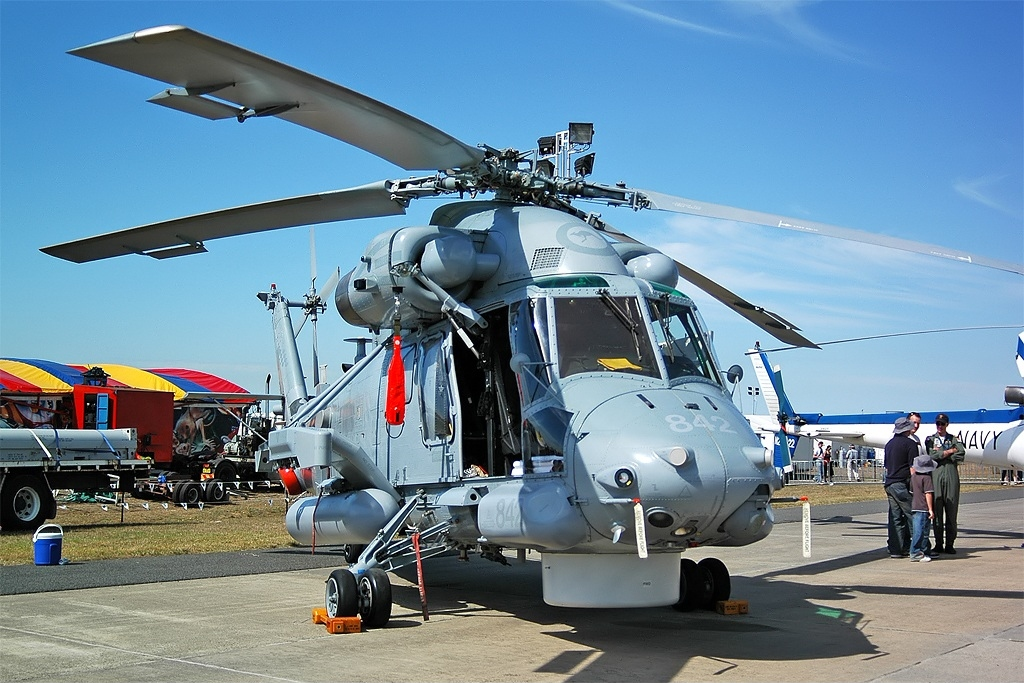
Kaman SH-2G(A) Seasprite of 805 Squadron

On 10 January 1968, 805 Squadron reformed, equipped with the McDonnell Douglas A-4G Skyhawk fighter. The VF-805 designation was used to conform with USN squadron naming system during the Skyhawk era, under which 'VF' referred to fixed wing fighter aircraft, denoting the fleet defence role of the squadron's aircraft. The squadron operated from Melbourne until 1982.

On 28 February 2001, 805 Squadron was reformed, equipped with Kaman SH-2G(A) Super Seasprite helicopters to be operated from the new Anzac-class frigates. The Squadron completed First of Class Flight Trials aboard HMAS Parramatta, but did not reach operational status due to difficulties with integrating the helicopters' avionic systems. Following technical problems with the new helicopter, the squadron was relegated to minimal duties in 2005, grounded in 2006, and faced possible scrapping in early 2007. Efforts to rectify the technical problems were not successful and the project was cancelled in early 2008. As a result, 805 Squadron was disbanded on 26 June 2008.

== Aircraft ==
=== RN service ===
- Fairey Fulmar
- Brewster Buffalo
- Grumman Martlett III
- Supermarine Seafire (Strike)

=== RAN service ===
- Hawker Sea Fury Mk II
- de Havilland Sea Venom FAW.53
- McDonnell Douglas A-4G Skyhawk
- Kaman SH-2 Seasprite
