= 851 Naval Air Squadron =

Defunct flying squadron of the Royal Navy's Fleet Air Arm

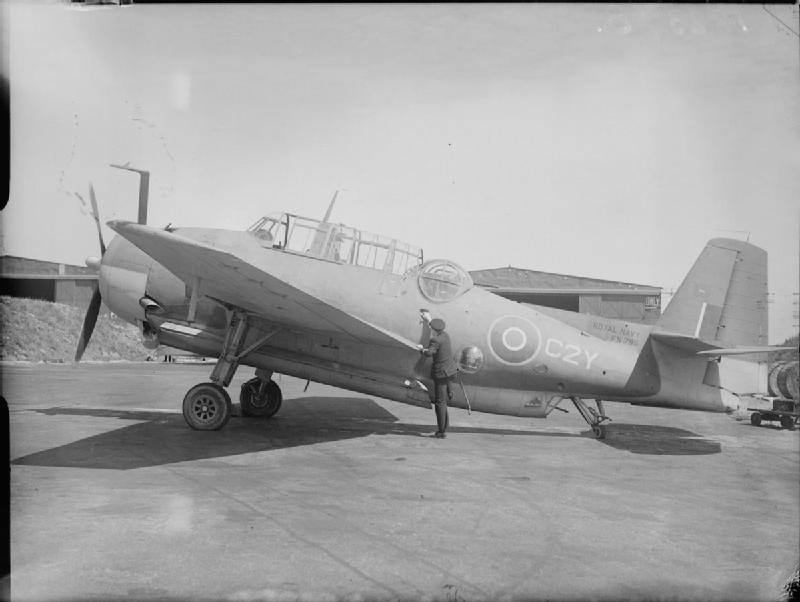
- Grumman Avenger; an example of the type used by 851 NAS
- Active: 1943–1945
- Disbanded: 7 October 1945
- Country: United Kingdom
- Branch: Royal Navy
- Type: Torpedo Bomber Reconnaissance squadron
- Role: Carrier-based: anti-submarine warfare (ASW); anti-surface warfare (ASuW); Combat air patrol (CAP)
- Size: twelve aircraft
- Part of: Fleet Air Arm
- Home station: See Naval air stations section for full list.
- Engagements: World War II: Pacific War
- Battle honours: East Indies 1944; Malaya 1945; Burma 1945

Insignia
- Identification Markings: 1A+ to SA+ (Avenger); single letters (Wildcat)

Aircraft flown
- Bomber: Grumman Avenger
- Fighter: Grumman Wildcat

851 Naval Air Squadron (851 NAS), also referred to as 851 Squadron, was a Fleet Air Arm (FAA) naval air squadron of the United Kingdom's Royal Navy (RN). It operated both Grumman Avenger torpedo bomber and Grumman Wildcat fighter aircraft between 1943 and 1945.

It was established at Squantum, Massachusetts, in October 1943, as a Torpedo Bomber Reconnaissance with Grumman Avenger Mk.I. In January 1944, the squadron traveled across the USA to California, before embarking in HMS Shah. The carrier was assigned to the 1st Aircraft Carrier Squadron and was one of the few escort carriers that went into active service before journeying to the UK and the squadron saw active service in the Far East. During its time it added a flight of four Grumman Wildcat Mk V, but the squadron was disbanded in October 1945.

The squadron was reformed for the Royal Australian Navy's Fleet Air Arm as 851 Squadron RAN on 3 August 1954.

== History ==
=== Torpedo, Bomber, Reconnaissance squadron (1943-1945) ===
==== Formation and work up ====
851 Naval Air Squadron convened at Royal Naval Air Establishment (RNAE) Townhill (HMS Waxwing), Townhill, Fife, starting on 1 September 1943, in preparation for their journey to the US on the RMS Queen Mary, which departed on 10 September, to officially establish themselves at Squantum, Massachusetts. The Squadron was established in the United States on 1 October at the US Naval Air Station Squantum in Massachusetts, which had been loaned to the Admiralty from September and known as Royal Naval Air Station Squantum, under the leadership of Lieutenant Commander(A)(P) A.M. Tuke, DSC, RN.

The commanding officer and ground personnel were from the UK, pilots from 738 Pilot Training Squadron based at RNAS Lewiston, Maine, Observers from RNAS Piarco, Trinidad and Telegraphist Air Gunners (TAGs) from Canada. The squadron was equipped with twelve Tarpon Mk I aircraft designated for Torpedo Bomber Reconnaissance operations. The Grumman Avengers delivered to the FAA were provided under Lend-Lease agreements, commencing in 1943. Until January 1944, the British designation Tarpon was employed. The Tarpon Mk I (subsequently referred to as the Avenger Mk I) functioned as the British equivalent of the US Navy TBF-1.

Following familiarisation with the aircraft and equipment, the squadron commenced rigorous training to prepare for active duty. The twelve-week work-up period encompassed various facets of the operations of torpedo bomber reconnaissance squadrons, which included navigation drills, low-altitude flying, formation flying, and combat strategies, as well as techniques for torpedo and depth charge attacks. On 14 December, the squadron departed for the US Naval Air Station Norfolk, Virginia, to engage in a brief period of deck landing training (DLT), operating with the training carrier USS Charger in Chesapeake Bay. Upon completion on 16, they returned to RNAS Squantum.

==== Indian Ocean ====
In January 1944, after traversing the United States to reach California with overnight stops in Virginia, Tennessee, New Mexico, and Arizona, the squadron boarded the Ruler-class escort carrier, HMS Shah, for their journey to India.HMS Shah was among the few escort carriers that were activated for service prior to her journey to the UK; she was assigned to the 1st Aircraft Carrier Squadron within the East Indies Fleet, serving as an anti-submarine carrier. She reached San Francisco Bay on 7 January, where she began preparations to take on her squadron, 851 Naval Air Squadron. The squadron arrived at the US Naval Air Station Alameda on 14 January, and the aircraft were lifted aboard later that same day, being stored in the hangar; there would be no flying during the voyage. HMS Shah departed from San Francisco in the afternoon of 15 January and ultimately, 851 Squadron was flown off to RNAS Colombo Racecourse in Ceylon on 21 March.

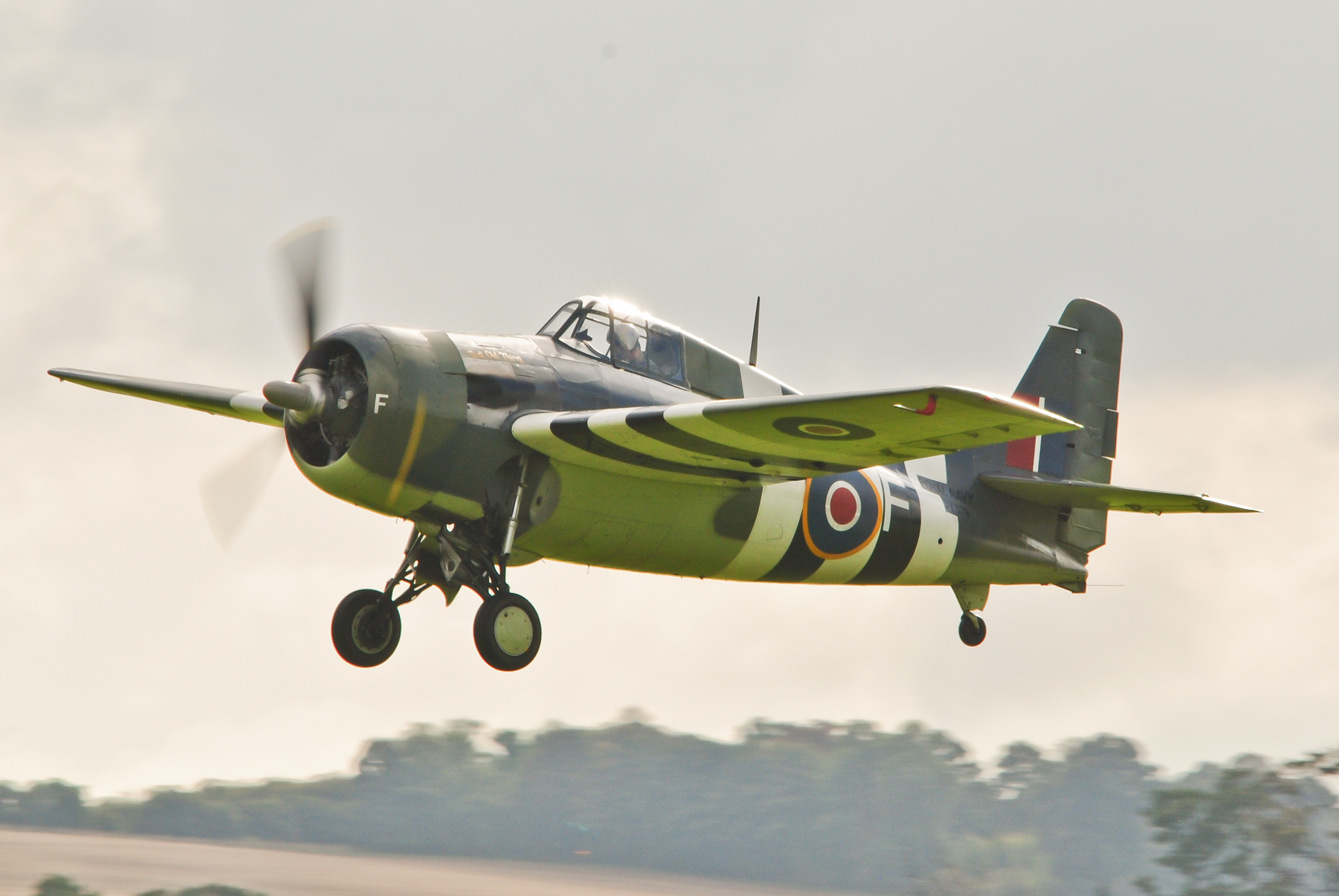
Grumman Wildcat; a similar example to the type used by 851 Squadron

The squadron moved to RNAS Katukurunda (HMS Ukussa), Ceylon, on 1 April to continue their training. Upon their arrival, a fighter flight comprising four Grumman Wildcat fighter aircraft was formed, and the squadron was classified as a composite anti-submarine (A/S) sweeps unit. The squadron alternated between this and other shore bases as well as the carrier. From mid-May, the ship conducted patrols in the Indian Ocean.

==== Sinking of U-198 ====
At the conclusion of July, HMS Shah was designated to join Task Force 66 (TF66), a naval force dedicated to trade protection operations in the northern Indian Ocean. On 6 August, TF66 departed to locate a U-Boat that had been targeting shipping along the East African coast. On the same day, MV Empire City was torpedoed and sunk off the coast of Portuguese East Africa. The subsequent day, MV Empire Day also fell victim to a torpedo attack and was sunk. On 10 August, Lieutenant Commander Tuke, the commanding officer of 851 Squadron, observed a U-boat on the surface and initiated an attack run; however, the submarine submerged to evade capture. Nevertheless, on 12 August, Tuke once again spotted the U-boat, was sufficiently close to launch an attack, and successfully straddled it with the two depth charges he carried, both detonating on either side of the conning tower. Although damage could not be clearly ascertained the aircraft directed the RN River-class frigate HMS Findhorn and the Royal Indian Navy's Black Swan-class sloop HMIS Godavari to the submarine and they were able to sink U-198 with the loss of all hands.

==== Sinking of Haguro ====
In February 1945 Shah sailed to Durban for a refit, and the Wildcats were withdrawn. Sailing to Burma in May 1945, Shah with 851 Squadron's Avengers supported Operation Dracula, the invasion of Rangoon. 851 Squadron dive-bombed the Japanese heavy cruiser Haguro, suffering losses in the attacks for little return. This was the longest range Fleet Air Arm round-trip carrier borne attack of the Second World War. However, they did direct ships of the 26th Destroyer Flotilla which sank Haguro in a night torpedo action known as Operation Dukedom.

==== Decommissioning ====
The squadron subsequently returned to RNAS Katukurunda, RNAS Colombo Racecourse and RNAS Trincomalee, all Ceylon. After VJ-Day the squadron left their aircraft and sailed on HMS Shah to the UK where the squadron was disbanded at Gourock, Renfrewshire, on 7 October 1945 and the escort carrier returned to the United States.

851 Squadron was subsequently reactivated as a squadron of the Royal Australian Navy.

== Aircraft flown ==
The squadron has flown a couple of different aircraft types:

- Grumman Avenger Mk I torpedo bomber (October 1943 - September 1945)
- Grumman Wildcat Mk V fighter aircraft (April 1944 - February 1945)

== Battle honours ==
The following Battle Honours have been awarded to 851 Naval Air Squadron:

- East Indies 1944
- Malaya 1945
- Burma 1945

== Naval air stations ==
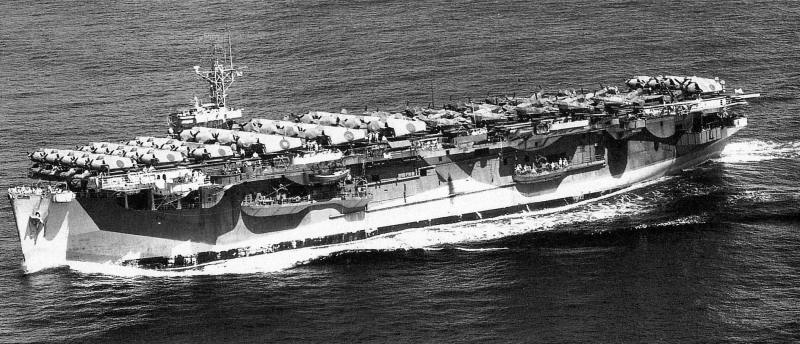
HMS Shah; ferrying aircraft en route to Melbourne from San Francisco

851 Naval Air Squadron operated from a number of naval air stations of the Royal Navy overseas, a number of Royal Air Force stations and also a number of Royal Navy escort carriers and other airbases overseas:

- Royal Naval Air Station Squantum, Massachusetts, (1 October 1943 - 1 January 1944)
  - RN Air Section Norfolk, Virginia, (Detachment ten aircraft 1 - 5 December 1943)
  - RN Air Section Norfolk, Virginia, (Detachment eight aircraft deck landing training (DLT) USS Charger 10 - 12 December 1943)
- Naval Air Station Alameda, California, (7 - 14 January 1944)
- HMS Shah (14 January - 5 March 1944)
  - RN Air Section Cochin, India, (Detchment one aircraft 3 - 19 March 1944)
- RN Air Section Cochin, India, (5 - 6 March 1944)
- HMS Shah (6 - 19 March 1944)
- Royal Naval Air Station Colombo Racecourse (HMS Berhunda), Ceylon, (19 March - 1 April 1944)
- Royal Naval Air Station Katukurunda (HMS Ukussa), Ceylon, (1 April - 14 May 1944)
  - HMS Unicorn (DLT 1 - 4 May 1944)
- HMS Shah (14 May - 30 June 1944)
- Royal Naval Air Station Colombo Racecourse (HMS Berhunda), Ceylon, (30 June - 26 July 1944)
- HMS Shah (26 July - 21 October 1944)
  - Royal Naval Air Station Colombo Racecourse (HMS Berhunda), Ceylon, (Detachment eight aircraft 28 - 30 July 1944)
  - Royal Air Force Khormaksar, Yemen, (Detachment three aircraft 10 - 15 September 1944)
  - RN Air Section Port Reitz, Kenya, (Detachment nine aircraft 21 September - 5 October 1944)
  - RN Air Section Cochin, India, (Detachment two/four aircraft 12 - 17 October 1944)
  - Royal Naval Air Station Colombo Racecourse (HMS Berhunda), Ceylon, (Detachment four aircraft 17 - 21 October 1944)
- RN Air Section Ratmalana, Ceylon, (21 October - 18 November 1944)
- RN Air Section Vavuniya, Ceylon, (18 - 20 November 1944)
- RN Air Section Minneriya, Ceylon, (20 November - 19 December 1944)
- Royal Naval Air Station Colombo Racecourse (HMS Berhunda), Ceylon, (19 - 26 December 1944)
- Royal Naval Air Station Katukurunda (HMS Ukussa), Ceylon, (26 December 1944 - 10 January 1945)
- HMS Shah (10 January - 23 February 1945)
  - Royal Naval Air Station Trincomalee (HMS Bambara), Ceylon, (Detachment three/five 23 January - 3 February 1945)
- RN Air Section Stamford Hill, South Africa, (23 February - 5 April 1945)
  - Royal Naval Air Station Wingfield (HMS Malagas), South Africa, (Detachment three aircraft 20 - 24 March 1945)
- HMS Shah (5 April - 11 May 1945)
  - RN Air Section Port Reitz, Kenya, (Detachment four aircraft 13 - 15 April 1945)
  - HMS Empress (Detachment one aircraft 1 - 8 May 1945)
- HMS Emperor (11 - 21 May 1945)
- Royal Naval Air Station Katukurunda (HMS Ukussa), Ceylon, (21 May - 7 June 1945)
- Royal Naval Air Station Colombo Racecourse (HMS Berhunda), Ceylon, (7 - 27 June 1945)
- HMS Shah (27 June - 6 July 1945)
- Royal Naval Air Station Trincomalee (HMS Bambara), Ceylon, (6 July - 2 September 1945)
  - HMS Shah (Detachment four aircraft 17 July - 1 September 1945)
- Royal Naval Air Station Karukurunda (HMS Ukussa), Ceylon, (aircraft 2 September 1945)
- disbanded UK - (7 October 1945)

== Commanding officers ==
List of commanding officers of 851 Naval Air Squadron:

- Lieutenant Commander (A) A. M. Tuke, DSC, RN, from 1 October 1943
- Lieutenant Commander (A) M. T. Fuller, DSC, RNVR, from 15 September 1944
- Disbanded - 7 October 1945

Abbreviations: (A) signifies Air Branch of the RN or RNVR.
