= RAAF University Squadrons =

RAAF University Squadrons were formed in each state of Australia in 1950 as part of the Citizen Air Force (CAF). They were formed to provide officer training to undergraduates who would then serve as commissioned officers in the RAAF General Reserve. Each squadron consisted of a number of specialist flights including: Flying, Medical, Equipment, Administrative and Technical. The squadrons were disbanded in 1973 following the end of conscription. Approximately 3,100 commissioned officers were trained by the various squadrons over the period of 24 years.

== University squadrons ==
=== New South Wales ===
Formed as the Sydney University Squadron on 16 October 1950, its motto was Eadem Mens Alta Petendi (Latin: "In the Same Mind of Seeking the Heights"). The squadron changed its name to the New South Wales University Squadron in March 1967. It was disbanded on 31 October 1973.

=== Queensland ===
Formed on 31 October 1950 in Brisbane, its motto was Peritus Ac Paratus (Latin: "Skilled and Ready"). It was disbanded on 25 August 1973.

=== South Australian ===
Formed as the Adelaide University Squadron on 10 November 1950, its motto was Astra Pete Discendo (Latin: "Seek the Stars by Learning"). The squadron changed its name to the South Australian University Squadron on 11 January 1967. It was disbanded on 28 September 1973.

=== Tasmanian ===
Formed on 3 November 1950 in Hobart, its motto was Ingeniis Patuit Campus (Latin: "There is an Open Field for Talent"). It was disbanded on 25 August 1973.

=== Victorian ===
Formed on 25 October 1950 in Melbourne, its motto was Strength From Knowledge. It was disbanded on 18 October 1973.

=== Western Australian ===
Formed on 30 October 1950 in Perth, its motto was Scientia Potentia (Latin: "Knowledge is Strength"). It was disbanded on 24 August 1973.
