= 822X Squadron RAN =

822X Squadron
- Active: 2018–Current
- Country: Australia
- Branch: Royal Australian Navy
- Type: Trials unit
- Size: One squadron
- Part of: Fleet Air Arm
- Airbase: HMAS Albatross
- Motto(s): "See the Enemy"
- Equipment: Boeing Insitu Integrator

822X Squadron is a Royal Australian Navy Fleet Air Arm squadron established in October 2018. Its role is to trial unmanned aerial vehicles.

== History ==
The RAN established a Navy UAS Development Unit in late 2012. This unit was tasked with experimenting with a UAV to test the type's suitability and begin developing procedures. It began flying its first UAV, a leased Boeing Insitu ScanEagle, in March 2013. The Navy purchased two ScanEagles in June 2015, and the unit was renamed the Naval Unmanned Aircraft Systems Unit. Schiebel Camcopter S-100 UAVs were acquired in late 2016, and accepted into RAN service on 30 April 2018.

822X Squadron was formed at HMAS Albatross on 25 October 2018 by redesignating the Naval Unmanned Aircraft Systems Unit. The X in its title indicates that it is a developmental unit; this is the first time the Royal Australian Navy has used such a designation.

The squadron's role is to experiment with operating UAVs and develop procedures for integrating them into the Navy. Upon formation, the squadron was equipped with Insitu ScanEagle and Camcopter S-100 UAVs. These are intelligence UAVs equipped with high quality cameras. 822X Squadron's title was drawn from the serial number of the Naval Unmanned Aircraft Systems Unit's first aircraft, a ScanEagle designated AV1422.

As of October 2018, the RAN intended to trial the Camcopter S-100s and ScanEagles for three to five years, and purchase other UAVs in the 2022-23 financial year. In May 2022 Camcopter S-100s were ordered for the RAN, but this acquisition was cancelled in September 2023 following a change of government and a defence review. 822X Squadron ceased operating the type on 30 June 2024, at the conclusion of a contract with Schiebel Pacific. Overall, six S-100 Camcopters had been used by the RAN and they had conducted trials from several warships.

The Boeing Insitu Integrator was selected for the RAN. 822X Squadron began flying operations with the type in October 2025.
