= HMAS Albatross (air station) =

Naval base in Australia

- Naval Air Station (NAS) Nowra
- Nowra, New South Wales in Australia
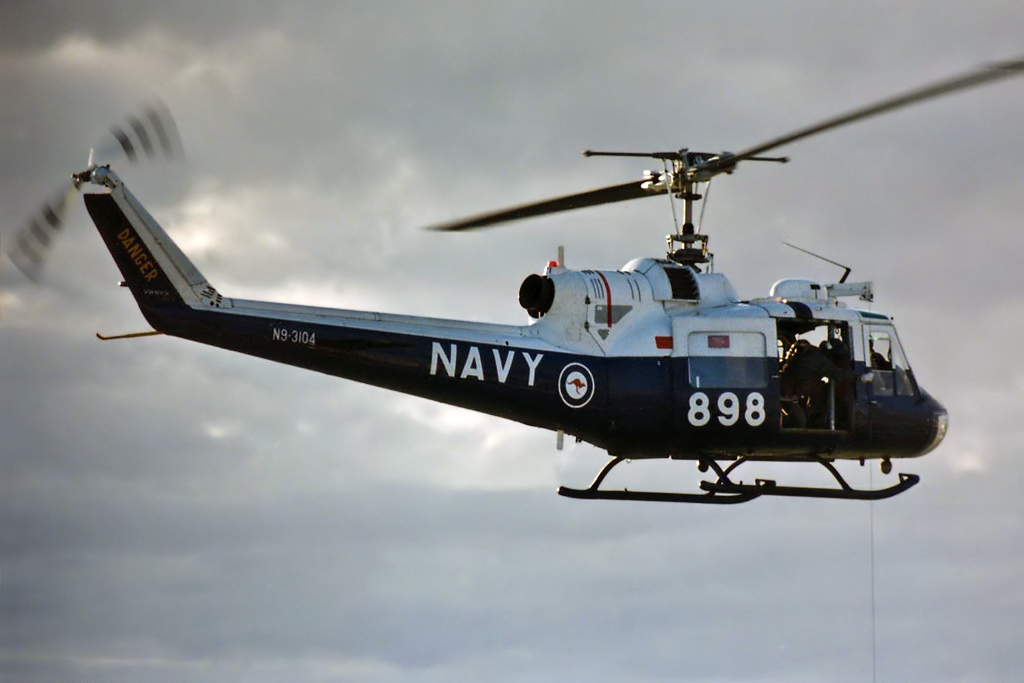
- A RAN Bell UH-1B Huey VH-NVV hovering at NAS Nowra in January 1996 on the occasion of the 1996 Air Day at HMAS Albatross.

Site information
- Type: Naval air station
- Owner: Department of Defence
- Operator: Royal Australian Navy
- Website: HMAS Albatross

Location
- Coordinates: 34°56′56″S 150°32′13″E

Site history
- Built: May 1942
- In use: Royal Australian Air Force (1941–1944); Royal Navy (1944–1945); Royal Australian Navy (1948–1967); Royal Australian Navy (1967–present)

Garrison information
- Current commander: Captain Paul Hannigan, RAN
- Garrison: Fleet Air Arm
- Occupants: 723 Squadron with EC135 T2+ helicopters; 725 Squadron with MH-60R Seahawk helicopters; 808 Squadron with MH-60R Seahawk helicopters; 816 Squadron with MH-60R Seahawk helicopters; 822X Squadron with Schiebel Camcopter S-100

Airfield information
- Identifiers: IATA: NOA, ICAO: YSNW
- Elevation: 122 metres (400 ft) AMSL
Runways
Direction	Length and surface
03/21	2,046 metres (6,713 ft) Asphalt
08/26	2,094 metres (6,870 ft) Asphalt
- Sources: Australian AIP and aerodrome chart

HMAS Albatross is the main naval air station for the Royal Australian Navy's (RAN) aviation branch, the Fleet Air Arm. The base, located near Nowra, New South Wales, was formally established in May 1942 as Royal Australian Air Force (RAAF) base RAAF Nowra, then was transferred to the Royal Navy as HMS Nabbington in 1944, and operated as a naval air station until it was decommissioned in late 1945. In 1948, the airfield was commissioned into the RAN as HMAS Albatross, as the primary shore base for the Fleet Air Arm. Since 2011, five squadrons of the Fleet Air Arm operate from Albatross. As of 2026, the current commander of the base is Captain Paul Hannigan, RAN.

The base is home to the military airport Naval Air Station (NAS) Nowra (IATA: NOA, ICAO: YSNW), completed in June 1941.

== History ==
The current site of HMAS Albatross was identified in 1938 and land was purchased in June 1939. Construction proceeded at what seems to be a leisurely pace considering it was war time, until the airfield was declared operational in June 1941. The airfield was used by squadrons of the Bristol Beaufort torpedo bombers of RAAF when it opened in May 1942. Martin Marauder bombers of the United States Army Air Forces (USAAF) were also based there in 1942–43 for training as torpedo bombers.

In 1944, the need for the Fleet Air Arm of the Royal Navy for shore bases led to RAAF Nowra, due to its proximity to Jervis Bay, being transferred to the RN, being renamed HMS Nabbington. This base was used by Mobile Overseas Naval Air Base (MONAB) No. 1 from 21 December 1944 to 15 November 1945. The base supported the British Pacific Fleet's aircraft carriers by providing shore based facilities for the Carrier Air Groups when the carriers were in Sydney for repairs and resupply. At the end of the Pacific War the British Pacific Fleet returned through its main base in Australia and FAA Squadrons transited through HMS Nabbington until it was decommissioned on 15 November 1945.

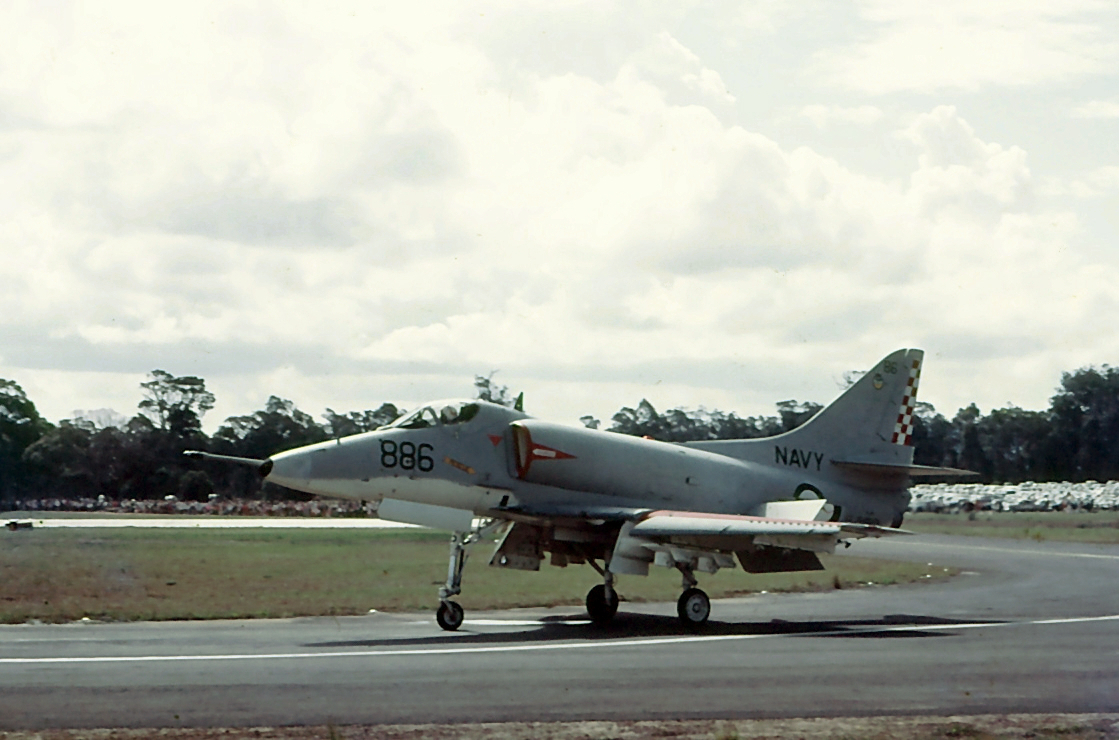
A-4 Skyhawk at Nowra in 1969.

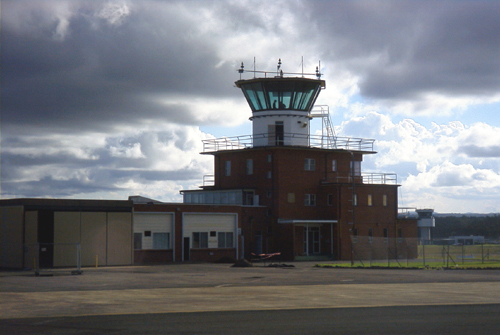
The control tower at NAS Nowra photographed in early 2003, shortly before it was demolished and replaced by another tower, just visible in the background.

HMS Nabswick (Mobile Naval Air Base / MONAB 5) moved from the nearby Jervis Bay airfield to Nowra where it operated until 18 March 1946 when the unit was decommissioned and the site was returned to the RAAF.

In 1947, the RAN's own Fleet Air Arm was formed, and the Nowra airfield was chosen to be its main shore base. HMAS Albatross was commissioned on 31 August 1948, taking the name previously carried by the RAN's seaplane carrier, and the first squadrons were delivered by the Australian aircraft carrier HMAS Sydney in May 1949. Over the course of the next decades, the RAN purchased larger, faster and more capable aircraft, which led to the facilities at Albatross being expanded - workshops and test facilities for jets were installed following the entry into service of the De Havilland Sea Venom in 1955, while a new control tower was built in 1958. The purchase of A-4 Skyhawks and S-2 Trackers with advanced avionics led to more facilities being installed in the late 1960s to service them.

On 5 December 1976, a fire was deliberately lit by a Fleet Air Arm member in the aircraft hangar. The fire destroyed or seriously damaged twelve of the thirteen S-2 Trackers in the RAN's possession.

The Skyhawk and Tracker squadrons flew from the aircraft carrier HMAS Melbourne until the carrier was decommissioned on 30 June 1982. This signalled the beginning of the end of the Fleet Air Arm's front line fixed wing capabilities, and also a scaling back of activities at Albatross.

In February 1991 RNZAF A-4 Skyhawks were stationed at the base to provide the ADF with Air Defence Support and participated in many exercises often flying below radar coverage and ambushing Australian warships on a number of occasions. A total of six Skyhawks and 50-60 RNZAF personnel were stationed at Nowra until No. 2 Squadron RNZAF and No. 75 Squadron RNZAF were disbanded following election of the Labour Government under Helen Clark in December 2001.

== Facilities and operational units ==
As of 2017, Albatross served as the home base for the 723 Squadron, 725 Squadron, 808 Squadron, and the 816 Squadron of the Fleet Air Arm. In addition, Albatross is the home base for the Navy Aviation Group, which coordinates all of the RAN's aviation activities. 'The following lodger units are located at Albatross:

- 453 SQN Nowra Flight (ATC)
- Naval Weather and Oceanographic Centre (NWOC) with embedded bureau forecaster - Tim Constable
- Training Authority – Aviation
- Naval Aviation Systems Program Office (NASPO)
- Australian Joint Acoustic Analysis Centre (AJACC)
- RAN Tactical Electronic Warfare Support Section (RANTEWSS)
- Aircraft Maintenance and Flight Trials Unit (AMAFTU)
- Australian Defence Force Parachuting School (ADFPS), Army
- Training Ship Shoalhaven, Australian Navy Cadets
- No. 330 (City of Shoalhaven) Squadron, Australian Air Force Cadets
- 238 ACU Sholhaven, Australian Army Cadets

In addition, Albatross is the home of the Fleet Air Arm Museum and the Royal Australian Navy Historic Flight.

Since 1986 there have been Learjet target tugs based at Albatross, operated by civilian companies under contract to the RAN. Previous operators included Lloyd Aviation, Fleet Support (a company later bought by National Jet Systems) and Pel-Air. Each company used four to five Learjet 35/36 series aircraft to provide the services; while Pel-Air also uses IAI Westwinds for non target-towing support operations. From 2015, the contract was awarded to Air Affairs Australia (a subsidiary of Qinetiq), operating a fleet of seven Learjets equipped for target towing and other fleet support missions out of a new facility at the Albatross Aviation Technology Park. The facility was opened by Prime Minister Malcolm Turnbull on 24 March 2016.

The naval base had the unusual distinction of being shared by a small civilian passenger terminal, which at various times was utilised by Masling Airlines and later Southern Cross Airways flying Beechcraft Queenair propeller driven aircraft on scheduled services on Sydney - Nowra - Moruya. Until 2004, the Royal Australian Navy Gliding Association (RANGA) also operated from the runways at Albatross with a small fleet of gliders used by both Navy and civilian members.

== Motor racing ==
On 16 June 1947 and 7 December 1952 motor racing was held at HMAS Albatross. The first meeting, featuring the 1947 Championship of New South Wales, used all of the main runways, for a lap distance of 7.00 kilometres (4.35 mi), while the 1952 event used taxiways, hard-stands and aprons for a shorter lap of 2.6 kilometres (1.6 mi).

== See also ==
- HMAS Nirimba - a decommissioned RAN former aviation base near Blacktown, New South Wales
- List of airports in New South Wales
- List of Royal Australian Navy bases
