= Fleet Air Arm (RAN) =

Part of the Royal Australian Navy

- Fleet Air Arm emblem
- Founded: 3 July 1947
- Country: Australia
- Type: Naval Aviation
- Part of: Royal Australian Navy
- Airbase: HMAS Albatross
- Motto: Unrivalled
- Website: Royal Australian Navy – Fleet Air Arm

Commanders
- Commander, Fleet Air Arm: Commodore Don Dezentje

Insignia
- Roundels

- White Ensign

Aircraft flown
- Attack: MH-60R Seahawk
- Trainer: Eurocopter EC135

The Fleet Air Arm (FAA), known formerly as the Australian Navy Aviation Group, is the division of the Royal Australian Navy (RAN) responsible for the operation of aircraft. The FAA was founded in 1947 following the purchase of two aircraft carriers from the Royal Navy. FAA personnel fought in the Korean War (operating from the carrier HMAS Sydney) and the Vietnam War (attached to a Royal Australian Air Force squadron and a United States Army Aviation company), and participated in later conflicts and operations from host warships.

Initially operating only fixed-wing aircraft, helicopters were first acquired by the FAA in 1952, forming Australia's first helicopter squadron. Helicopter usage increased over time, particularly after 1982, when the carrier HMAS Melbourne was decommissioned and not replaced. In 2000, following the removal from service of the land-based Hawker Siddeley HS 748 aircraft, the FAA became an all-helicopter force, operating in the anti-submarine warfare and maritime support roles. As of 2018, the FAA consists of five active squadrons, operating four helicopter types and two types of UAVs.

== History ==
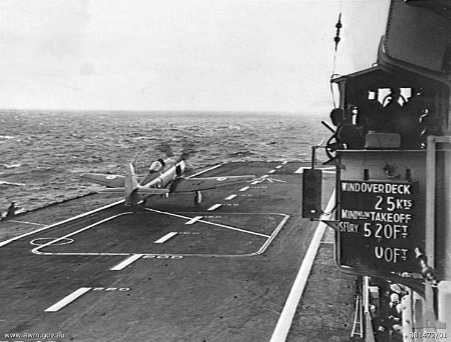
A Hawker Sea Fury on the flight deck of the carrier HMAS Sydney, during the ship's 1949 flight trials

During the 1920s, the RAN attempted to acquire government support for an Australian Fleet Air Arm, modelled loosely on the Royal Naval Air Service and its Royal Air Force-controlled successor, the Fleet Air Arm. This was approved as part of improvements to Australia's military, but opposition by the Royal Australian Air Force (RAAF) prompted the Cabinet to disband the organisation in January 1928, shortly after its establishment. The RAAF assumed responsibility for naval aviation, which consisted primarily of amphibious aircraft flown by No. 101 Flight RAAF (and its successors, No. 5 Squadron, then No. 9 Squadron) from the RAN's cruisers and the seaplane tender HMAS Albatross.

The successes of naval aviation during World War II reignited the idea of a RAN-controlled aviation force, with suggestions that Australia provide the personnel to operate a British aircraft carrier and the attached squadrons voiced during 1944, although the offer was withdrawn in mid 1945 because of manpower shortages. A review by the Australian Government's Defence Committee held after World War II recommended that the post-war forces of the RAN be structured around a Task Force incorporating multiple aircraft carriers. Initial plans were for three carriers, with two active and a third in reserve, although funding cuts led to the purchase of the Majestic-class light fleet carriers, Majestic and Terrible from the Royal Navy in June 1947. A Fleet Air Arm was established on 3 July 1947 by the Commonwealth Defence Council to operate aircraft from these two carriers, and also maintain two former Royal Australian Air Force bases as support facilities: these became HMAS Albatross at Nowra, New South Wales, and HMAS Nirimba at Schofields, New South Wales. As Terrible was the closer of the two ships to completion, construction was finished without major modification. The ship was commissioned into the RAN as HMAS Sydney on 16 December 1948. Sydney's maiden voyage saw the delivery of the first two squadrons operated by the Fleet Air Arm: 805 Squadron with Hawker Sea Furies, and 816 Squadron with Fairey Fireflies. The two squadrons operated as the 20th Carrier Air Group (CAG). Sydney returned to England in 1950 to collect the 21st Carrier Air Group: 808 and 817 Squadrons, with Sea Furies and Fireflies, respectively.

During the Korean War, Sydney was deployed to Korean waters in late 1951, with a wartime CAG of 805, 808, and 817 Squadrons embarked. The Fleet Air Arm operated in a strike, ground support, and escort role during the deployment, which saw three RAN pilots killed and a fourth seriously wounded, while thirteen aircraft were lost. Nine of these were shot down by North Korean flak artillery, with aircraft damaged by flak on at least ninety other occasions. The other four were lost in deck accidents, or crashed because of foul weather. Meanwhile, Majestic was undergoing major upgrades during construction to operate jet aircraft, including the installation of an angled flight deck, steam catapult, and a mirror landing aid. To allow the RAN to operate as a two-carrier force while Majestic was completed, the Royal Navy loaned the Colossus-class light carrier HMS Vengeance to the RAN in late 1952. Vengeance arrived in Australia with three Bristol Sycamore helicopters for the Fleet Air Arm. Although not the first helicopters to see military service in Australia (that title belonging to a Sikorsky S-51 of the Royal Australian Air Force), the Sycamores formed the first Australian military helicopter squadron, and prompted the establishment of Australia's first helicopter pilot school.

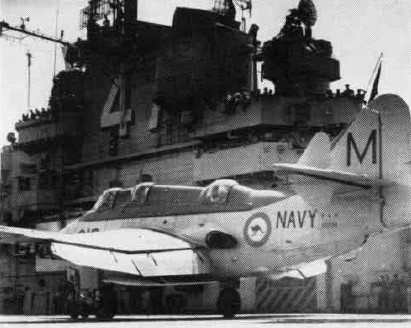
RAN Gannet aboard USS Philippine Sea

Vengeance was returned to the United Kingdom in 1955, with the crew transferred to Majestic, which was commissioned into the RAN as HMAS Melbourne on 28 October 1955. The new carrier delivered new aircraft to the Fleet Air Arm: the de Havilland Sea Venom jet fighter-bomber for 805 and 808 Squadrons, and the turboprop-driven Fairey Gannet anti-submarine aircraft for 816 and 817 Squadrons. These aircraft were due to become obsolete in the late 1950s, and the RAN considered purchasing modern aircraft of French or Italian design, which were smaller than British developments and better suited to light carrier operations. By the end of the 1950s, with Sydney decommissioned from service and refitted as a troop transport, it was decided that fixed-wing naval aviation would be replaced by a force of 27 Westland Wessex anti-submarine helicopters, to operate from Melbourne. This decision was rescinded in 1963, with Grumman S-2E Tracker anti-submarine aircraft and McDonnell Douglas A-4G Skyhawk fighter aircraft ordered for the Fleet Air Arm. Although Melbourne and her air group played no role in the Vietnam War, Australian naval aviators saw action as part of Royal Australian Navy Helicopter Flight Vietnam (a component of the joint Australian-American Experimental Military Unit) and the RAN Detachment, 9 Squadron Vietnam (attached to No. 9 Squadron RAAF).

In 1972, the Fleet Air Arm's Wessex helicopters were replaced with Westland Sea King anti-submarine helicopters, although a small number of Wessexes continued to serve in utility and search-and-rescue roles. Melbourne remained in service until mid-1982, when she was placed in reserve. The Australian government initially planned to purchase HMS Invincible from the Royal Navy and operate Harriers and helicopters from her, but the British withdrew the offer after the ship's performance in the Falklands War, and the 1983 election of the Australian Labor Party saw the cancellation of plans to replace Melbourne. With no aircraft carrier, carrier-borne fixed-wing aviation in the RAN ended on 30 June 1983 with the decommissioning of several squadrons, and many RAN pilots joined the Army and RAAF, or transferred to the aviation branches of other nations' navies. The RAN Skyhawks were sold to the Royal New Zealand Air Force, and the Trackers were removed from service and sold to a private company for disposal.

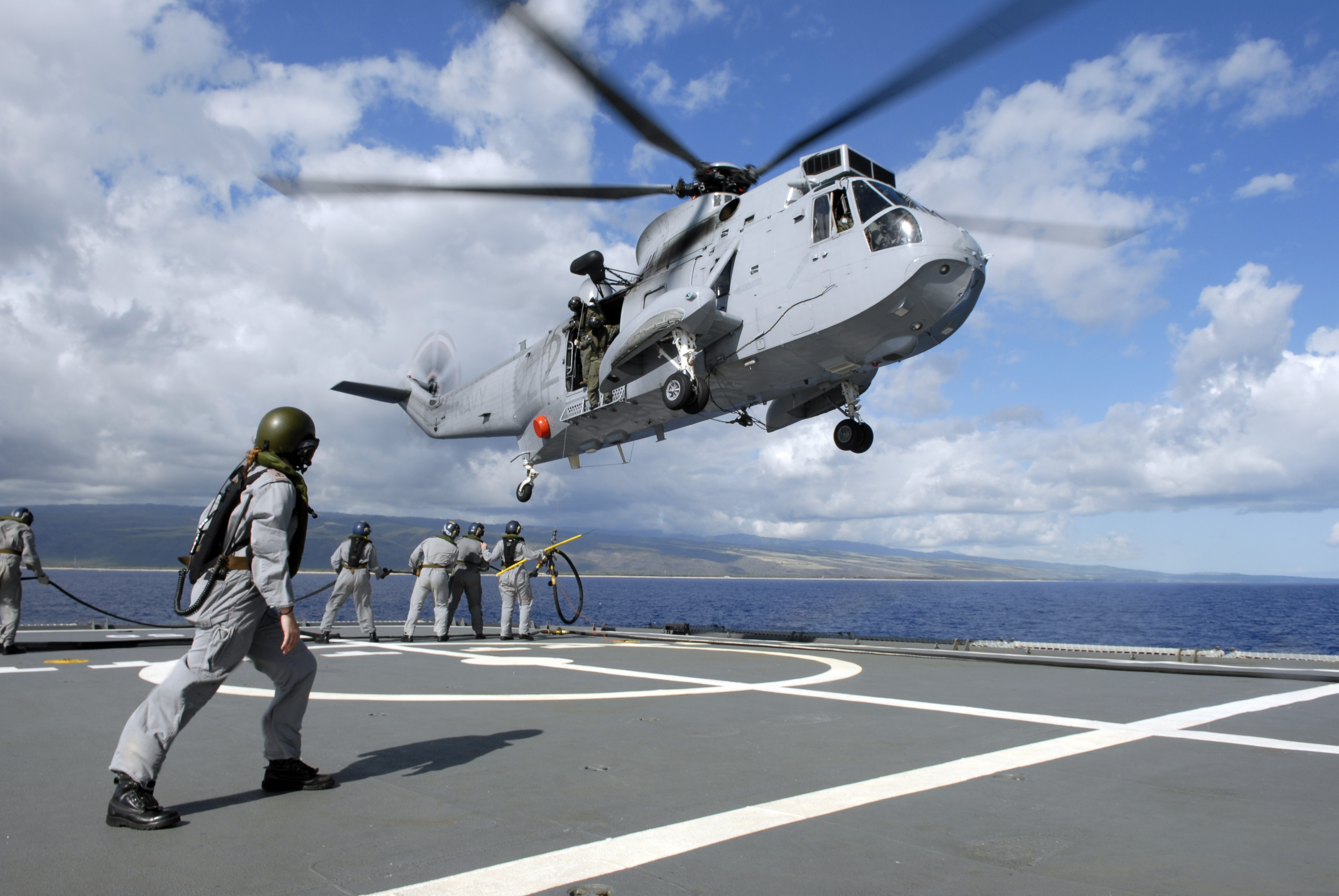
A Sea King hovering above the flight deck of HMAS Tobruk in 2008, prior to a Helicopter in Flight Refuel exercise

Before being sold off, the RAN Trackers were flown from land bases as patrol and surveillance aircraft, and HS 748 aircraft continued on in the electronic warfare training and transport roles after all other fixed-wing assets were disposed of. The shift from full, carrier-embarked squadrons to single- or two-helicopter flights operating from frigates forced overhauls of the management and organisational style of the FAA, with squadrons made to act with increasing independence and less experienced junior officers taking greater responsibility for the aviation activities of their assigned ship. During the 1980s, the Eurocopter Ecureuil (Squirrel) and Sikorsky S-70 Seahawk were acquired to operate from the Adelaide-class frigates. During the early 1990s, these helicopters operated aboard Australian ships deployed to support the international coalition during the Gulf War; they were used for anti-air surveillance and surface search, to deliver boarding parties to interdicted ships, and provide search-and-rescue capabilities. During 1992, FAA Sea Kings were embarked aboard HMAS Tobruk for Operation Solace, part of the famine-relief operation in Somalia.

During the 1990s, the FAA ordered several refurbished Kaman SH-2G Super Seasprite helicopters to operate from the Anzac-class frigates in the anti-submarine and anti-surface roles. Although due to enter service in the early 2000s, the helicopters were not operational until 2006, and were grounded shortly after with concerns over their airworthiness, flight control system, crash survivability, and inability to operate in poor weather. The delays and problems with the acquisition led to the cancellation of the project in March 2008, and the completed helicopters were returned to Kaman. These airframes were subsequently purchased by the RNZAF to replace their existing SH-2 fleet.

Since 2000, when the last pair of HS 748s were retired, the Fleet Air Arm has been an entirely rotary-winged force.^{(I)} The Fleet Air Arm became responsible for the operation and maintenance of the RAN's helicopter force from the frigates of the Adelaide and Anzac classes and from the RAN's amphibious and support ships.

== Current squadrons ==
RAN squadrons follow the same numbering system as those of the Royal Navy, with operational units numbered from 800 onwards and training units numbered from 700 onwards:

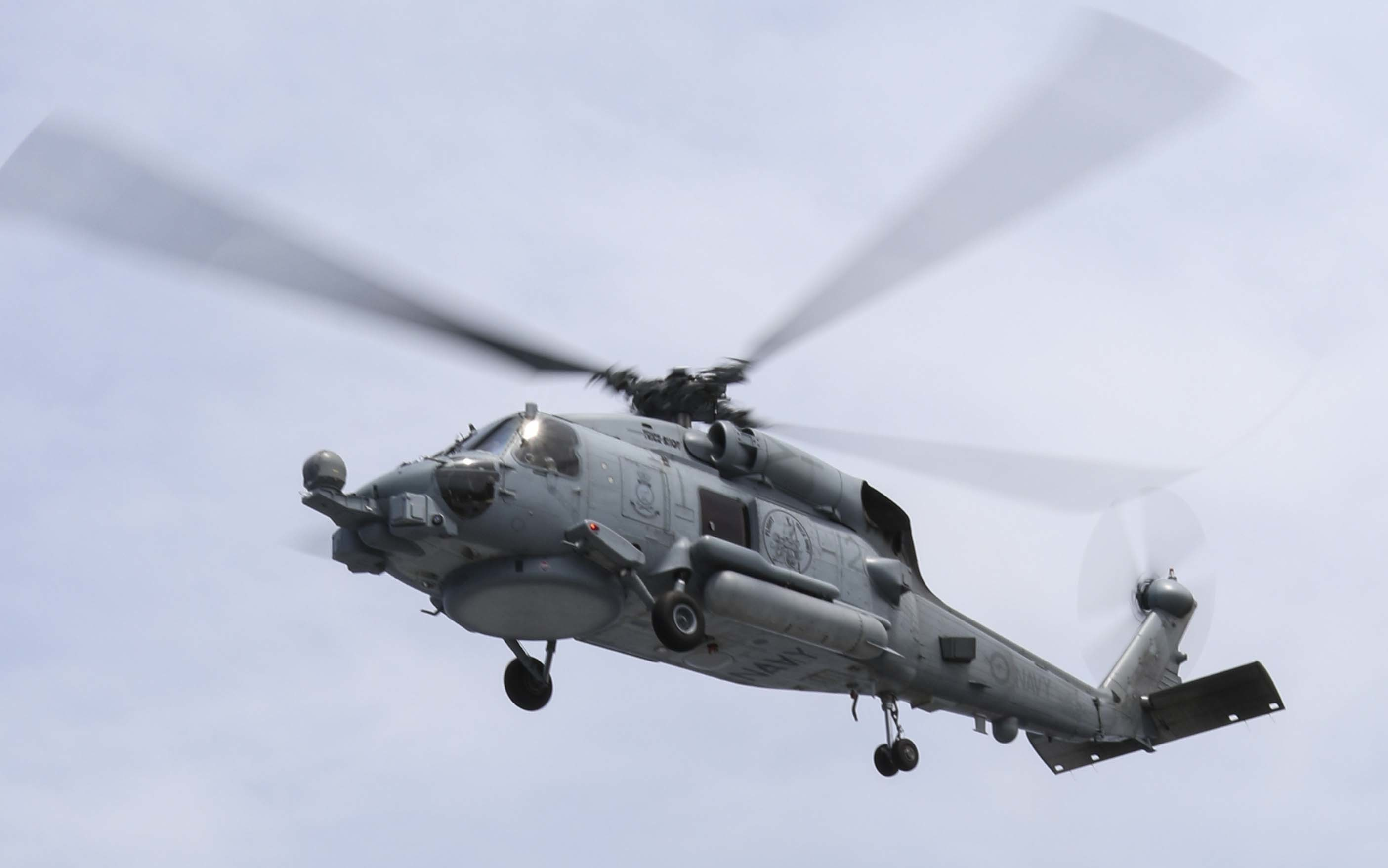
The MH-60R Seahawk, operated by 816 Squadron, is the most numerous aircraft in the RAN inventory

Squadron	Type	Aircraft	Base	Role	Notes
723 Squadron	Rotary	Eurocopter EC135	Nowra	Helicopter Aircrew Training System Retention and Motivation Initiative II	Also provides the RAN helicopter display team
725 Squadron	Rotary	MH-60R Romeo Seahawk	Nowra	Conversion training (Romeo Seahawk)	Reformed 2013; operational 2015
808 Squadron	Rotary	MH-60R Romeo Seahawk	Nowra	Tactical Transport/ Small ship flights	Flight numbers 801- 807
816 Squadron	Rotary	MH-60R Romeo Seahawk	Nowra	Small ship flights	Flight numbers 601 - 607
822X Squadron	UAV	Insitu ScanEagle	Nowra	Trials unit	
822X Squadron	UAV	Camcopter S-100	Nowra	Trials unit	

723 Squadron was the last unit in the Fleet Air Arm to operate fixed wing aircraft, when it withdrew its pair of HS 748s in June 2000. The last operational fixed wing squadron was 851 Squadron, which operated both HS 748s and S-2 Trackers until it was disbanded in August 1984. 816 Squadron was one of the FAA's two carrier-based fixed wing units, operating the Tracker (the other being 805 Squadron operating the A-4 Skyhawk) when HMAS Melbourne was decommissioned in 1982.

An additional flying unit of the Royal Australian Navy was the Laser Airborne Depth Sounder Flight, based at Cairns, which, following the withdrawal of the HS748, operated the only remaining fixed-wing aircraft in the RAN's inventory. This unit was not under the operational control of the Fleet Air Arm, but was instead part of the Australian Hydrographic Service, with both RAN and civilian personnel. The LADS flight was disbanded in 2019.

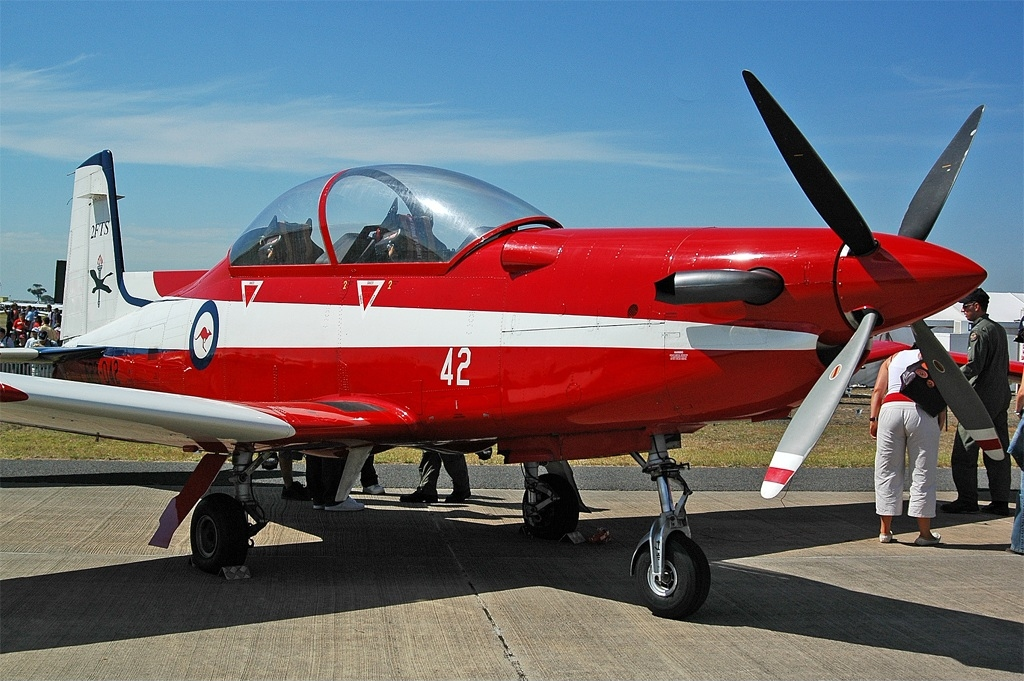
RAN pilots undertake advanced flying training using RAAF Pilatus PC-9s of No.2 FTS

=== Flying training ===
The RAN is not responsible for the initial basic and advanced flying training of its new aircrew. Basic flying training is undertaken by the tri-service Basic Flying Training School at Tamworth Airport, while advanced training for RAN pilots and training for observers is run by the Royal Australian Air Force:

- Advanced training for pilots is undertaken by No.2 Flying Training School at RAAF Base Pearce.
- Training for observers is undertaken by No.32 Squadron at RAAF Base East Sale.

Once RAN aircrew have passed through this process, they are posted to 723 Squadron for helicopter conversion training, before joining one of the two operational squadrons. 725 Squadron has been reformed to serve as a conversion unit for the new MH-60R Romeo Seahawk.
1: Described as "Maritime Aviation Warfare Officers"

== Aircraft ==
=== Current ===
Since 2000, when the last pair of HS 748s were retired, the Fleet Air Arm has been an entirely rotary winged force. The most numerous aircraft in the FAA's current inventory is the MH-60R Romeo operated by 816 Squadron, which provides small ship's flights to the Anzac class and Hobart class (1 aircraft on either platform). These undertake numerous missions, including anti-surface and anti-submarine warfare. The MRH-90 Taipan has replaced the Westland Sea King in the tactical transport and logistic support roles with 808 Squadron, operating from the RAN's amphibious support ships. A total of six of these aircraft are owned and operated by the RAN, while another seven are shared with the Army. Air defence of the fleet is primarily the task of the Hobart-class guided missile destroyers, armed with the SM-2 Standard SAM; these are supported when possible by the F/A-18 Hornets of the RAAF. The Department of Defence in the 2020 Force Structure Plan reported it planned to expand and rationalise the RAN's helicopter fleet. In October 2021, the US approved a Foreign Military Sale (FMS) to Australia of 12+1 additional MH-60Rs. On 13 October 2021, an MH-60R was lost in the Philippine Sea with the 3 crew only suffering minor injuries. The remaining 23 were temporarily grounded as a result.

Aircraft	Origin	Type	Variant	In service	Notes
Maritime Patrol
MH-60R Seahawk	United States	ASW / SAR		23	Originally 24. 1 lost. In 2021, the US approved a potential sale of 12 additional MH-60Rs. An additional MH-60 will be purchased to replace the one lost.
Trainer Aircraft
Eurocopter EC135	Germany	rotorcraft trainer		15	Shared with Army

=== Past plans ===
In the 2009 Defence White Paper, Defending Australia in the Asia Pacific Century: Force 2030, the government stated that the RAN needed 24 new naval combat helicopters by 2014, to replace the Seahawks and compensate for the cancelled Super Seasprite acquisition. The requirement called for a helicopter capable of both anti-submarine and anti-surface warfare, as well as search-and-rescue and troop transport (primarily of boarding parties) roles. Two aircraft were considered: the NATO Frigate Helicopter variant of the NH90, and the MH-60 Romeo, a version of the Sikorsky SH-60 Seahawk. In determining a replacement, it was considered that the NFH-90 had 80% commonality with the RAN and Army MRH-90s, and all airframes could be assembled at existing facilities in Queensland. Additionally, the type's corrosion-resistant composite fibre construction was assessed as providing better survivability in the event of crash at sea. However, the type had only become operational in 2010, although it had been on order with several European navies before this. In contrast, the MH-60 Romeo had been operational with the United States Navy since the end of 2005, and the commonality with the RAN's existing Seahawks would cut down on refamiliarisation training for pilots and maintenance personnel, the airframe has less interior space than the NFH-90 for the same approximate external size. By October 2009, the RAN was recommending the MH-60 Romeo, as they would be cheaper and less of a technological risk. On 1 June 2011, Defence Minister Stephen Smith announced that the MH-60 Romeo had been chosen, and the 24 helicopters would be delivered between 2014 and 2020.

Under current plans, the Royal Australian Navy's Canberra-class amphibious vessels can accommodate up to eighteen helicopters. Although the ships are potentially capable of operating STOVL fixed-wing aircraft, such as the F-35B Lightning and the V-22 Osprey, the operation of fixed-wing aircraft was not a tender criterion, and despite numerous suggestions, the Australian Government indicated that it did not intend to purchase fixed wing aircraft for the Fleet Air Arm to operate from the Canberra class. However, in 2014, both Tony Abbott, the Prime Minister, and David Johnston, the Minister for Defence indicated that the 2015 Defence White Paper could potentially consider the purchase of a number of F-35B aircraft as part of the final tranche of F-35 orders for Australia. In mid-2015, following evidence presented to a committee of the Australian Senate in which the Department of Defence conceded that there would be significant costs in adapting the two Canberra-class ships to operate the F-35B, the plan was dropped from the intended list of proposals that would be included in the government's upcoming defence white paper.

=== Retired ===
Examples of many aircraft operated by the Fleet Air Arm are on display at the Fleet Air Arm Museum at HMAS Albatross

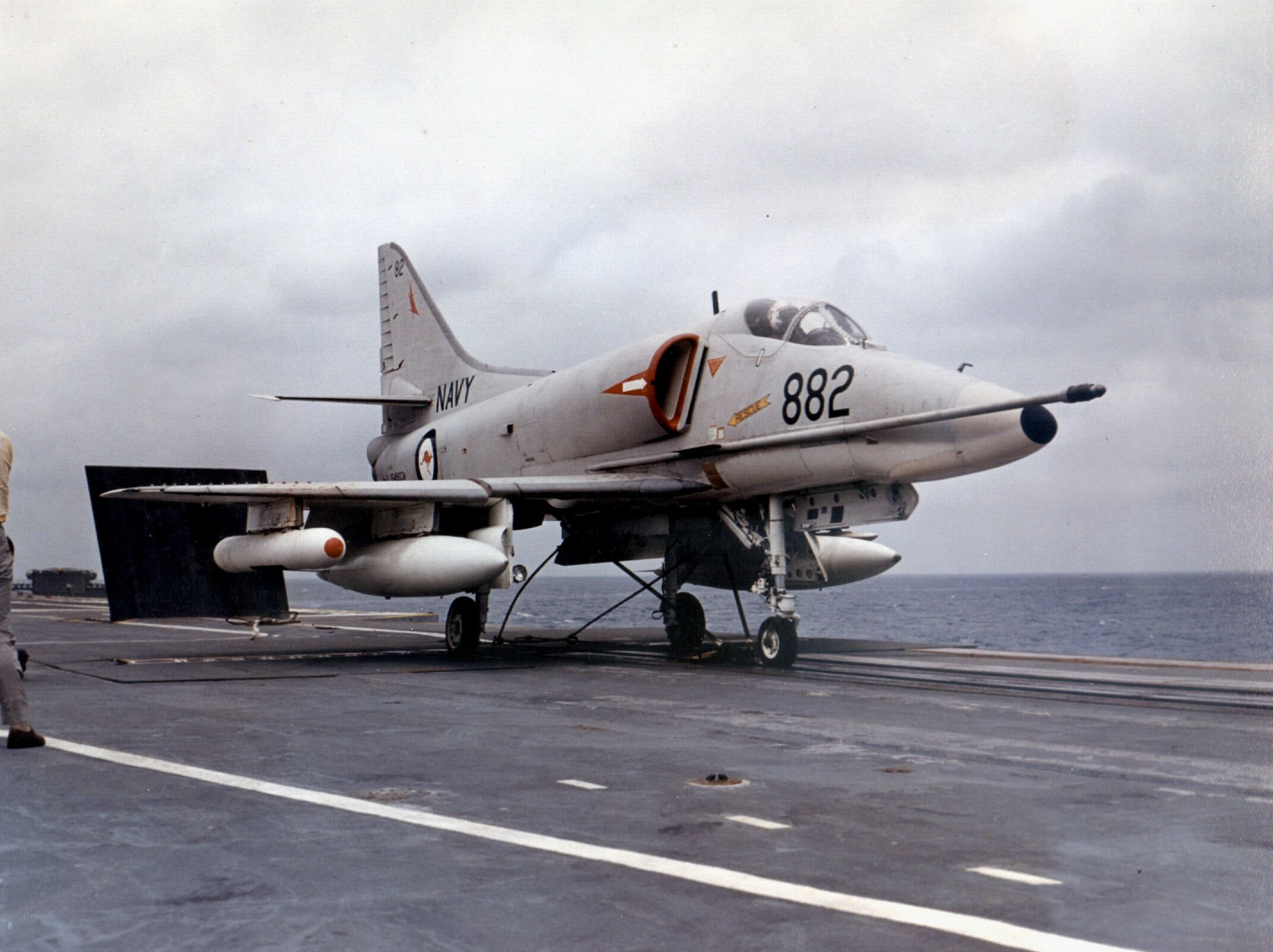
An A-4G aboard HMAS Melbourne

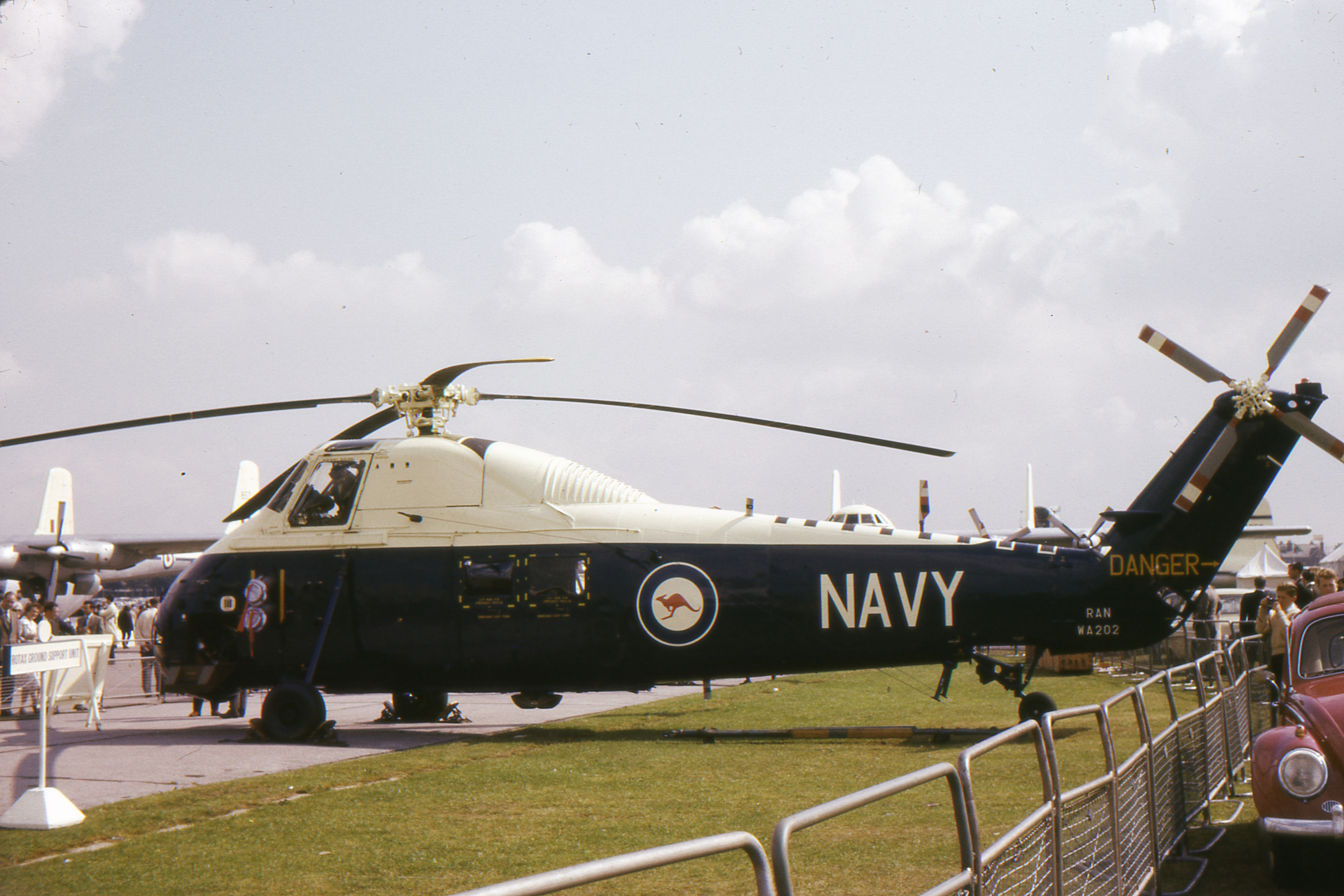
A Westland Wessex helicopter

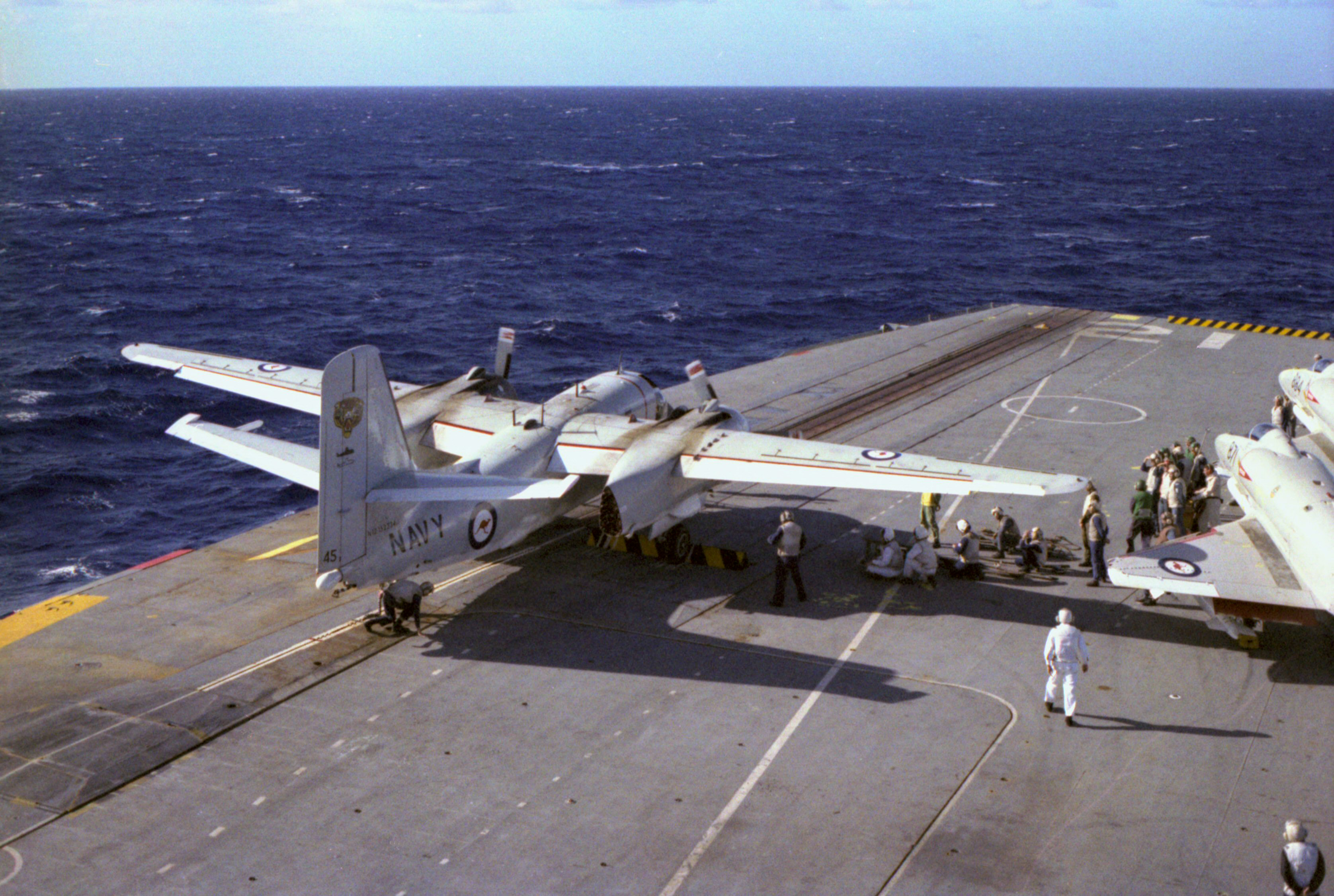
A S-2 Tracker prepares to launch from HMAS Melbourne

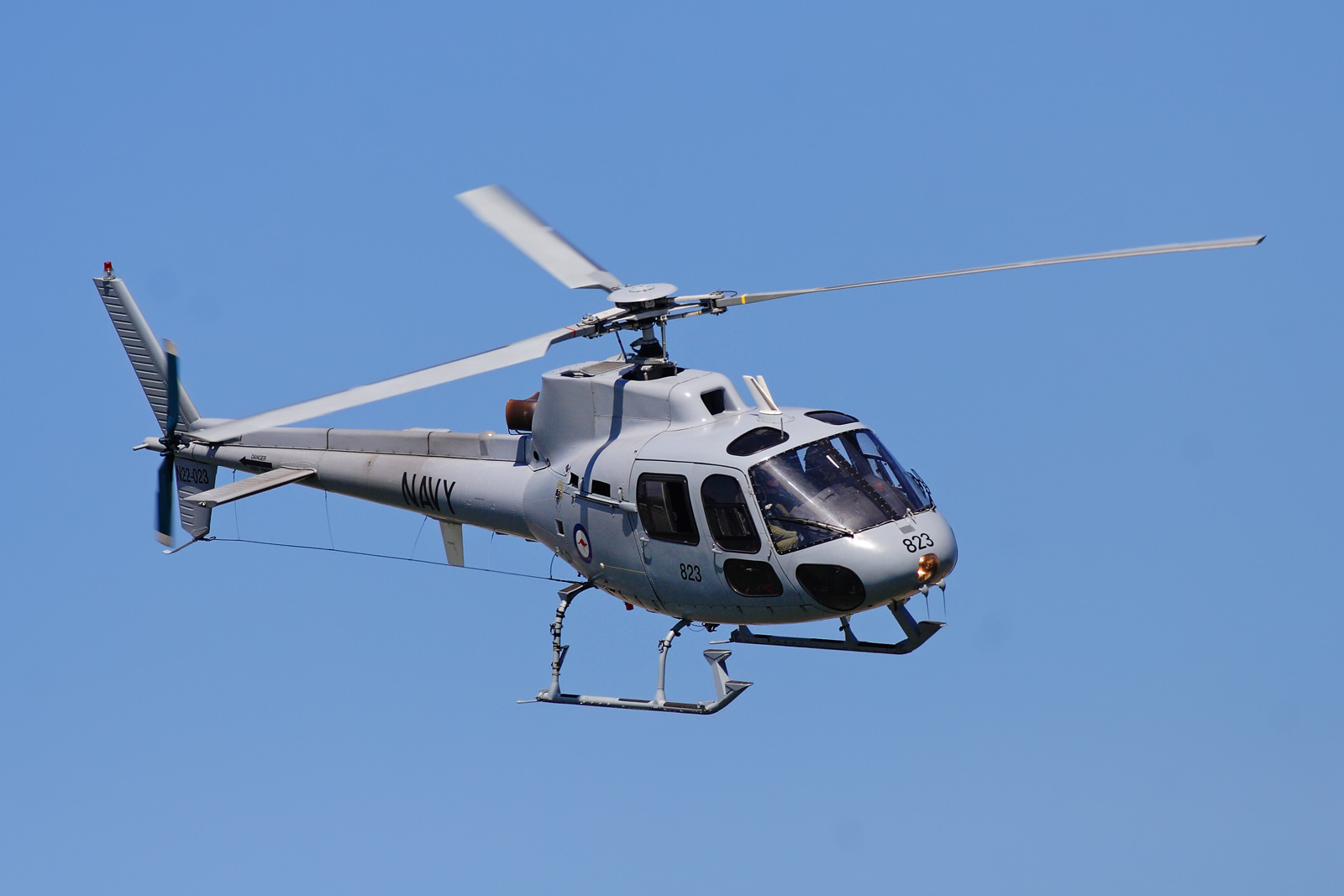
Eurocopter AS350 Écureuil of the RAN, 2008

Aircraft	Origin	Type	Variant	In service	Notes
Combat Aircraft
Fairey Firefly	United Kingdom	fighter-bomber		108	carrier-based aircraft - retired in 1958
Hawker Sea Fury	United Kingdom	fighter-bomber		101	carrier-based aircraft - retired in 1962
Fairey Gannet	United Kingdom	fighter-bomber / ASW		36	carrier-based aircraft - retired in 1967
de Havilland Sea Venom	United Kingdom	fighter-bomber / ASW		39	carrier-based aircraft – retired in 1967
Grumman S-2	United States	ASuW / ASW		32	carrier-based aircraft - retired in 1984
A-4 Skyhawk	United States	fighter-bomber	TA-4G/A-4G	20	carrier-based aircraft - retired in 1984
Transport
Supermarine Sea Otter	United Kingdom	SAR / transport		3	in service from 1948 to 1954
Douglas C-47	United States	transport		4	in service from 1949 to 1977
Auster Autocar	United Kingdom	transport / communications		2	in service from 1953 to 1965
Hawker Siddeley HS 748	United Kingdom	transport / EW		2	in service from 1973 to 2000
Helicopters
Bristol Sycamore	United Kingdom	utility / liaison		13	in service from 1953 to 1965
Westland Wessex	United Kingdom	ASW / SAR		27	in service from 1962 to 1989
Westland Scout	United Kingdom	patrol / SAR		2	in service from 1963 to 1977
Bell UH-1	United States	utility	UH-1D/C	7	in service from 1964 to 1987
Bell OH-58	United States	utility	OH-58B	4	in service from 1974 to 2000
Eurocopter AS350 Écureuil	France				in service from 1984 to 2017
Westland Sea King	United Kingdom	ASW / SAR	Mk 50A	12	in service from 1976 to 2011
SH-2G Super Seasprite	United States	ASW / SAR		15	in service from 2001 to 2008
S-70 Seahawk	United States	ASW / SAR	S-70B	16	in service from 1989 to 2017
Trainer Aircraft
CAC Wirraway	Australia	trainer		17	in service from 1948 to 1957
de Havilland Tiger Moth	Australia	trainer		3	in service from 1948 to 1957
de Havilland Vampire	United Kingdom	jet trainer		13	in service from 1954 to 1972
Aermacchi MB-326	Italy	jet trainer	MB-326H	10	in service from 1970 to 1983
Eurocopter AS350	France	rotorcraft trainer	Squirrel AS350BA	24	in service from 1984 to 2017
Bell 429	United States	rotorcraft trainer	Bell 429	3	in service from 2012 to 2019
Drone
Northrop KD2R-5	United States	target drone			in service from 1965 to 1973
GAF Turana	Australia	target drone			in service from 1966 to 2000
GAF Jindivik	Australia	target drone			in service from 1966 to 2000
Beechcraft MQM-107	United States	target drone	MQM-107E		in service from 1998 to 2008

== Weapons and equipment ==
=== Current ===
- AGM-114 Hellfire
- Mark 46 torpedo
- Mark 54 Lightweight Torpedo

== Notes ==
^(I) A LADS-equipped Bombardier Dash 8 is owned by the RAN, but this is attached to the Royal Australian Navy Hydrographic Service, not the FAA.

^(II) Refers to the number of individual aircraft operated by the FAA over the entire service life, not the number of aircraft in operation at any point within that service life.

== Sources ==
=== Books ===
- Australian Naval Aviation Museum (ANAM) (1998). Flying Stations: a story of Australian naval aviation. St Leonards, NSW: Allen & Unwin. ISBN 1-86448-846-8. OCLC 39290180.
- Bishop, Chris; Chant, Christopher (2004). Aircraft Carriers: the world's greatest naval vessels and their aircraft. London: MBI. ISBN 0-7603-2005-5. OCLC 56646560.
- Cooper, Alastair (2001). "The Korean War Era"; "The Era of Forward Defence". In Stevens, David (ed.). The Royal Australian Navy. The Australian Centenary History of Defence (vol III). South Melbourne, VIC: Oxford University Press. ISBN 0-19-555542-2. OCLC 50418095.
- Dennis, Peter; Grey, Jeffrey; Morris, Ewan; Prior, Robin (2008). The Oxford Companion to Australian Military History (2nd ed.). South Melbourne, VIC: Oxford University Press. ISBN 978-0-19-551784-2. OCLC 271822831.
- Donohue, Hector (October 1996). From Empire Defence to the Long Haul: post-war defence policy and its impact on naval force structure planning 1945–1955. Papers in Australian Maritime Affairs. Vol. 1. Canberra: Sea Power Centre. ISBN 0-642-25907-0. ISSN 1327-5658. OCLC 36817771.
- Hobbs, David (2005). "HMAS Sydney (III): a symbol of Australia's growing maritime capability". In Stevens, David; Reeve, John (eds.). The Navy and the Nation: the influence of the Navy on modern Australia. Crows Nest, NSW: Allen & Unwin. ISBN 1-74114-200-8. OCLC 67872922.
- Jones, Peter (2001). "Towards Self Reliance". In Stevens, David (ed.). The Royal Australian Navy. The Australian Centenary History of Defence (vol III). South Melbourne, VIC: Oxford University Press. ISBN 0-19-555542-2. OCLC 50418095.
- McCaffrie, Jack (2007). "Korea: The first challenge for Australian naval aviation". In Stevens, David; Reeve John (eds.). Sea Power ashore and in the air. Ultimo, NSW: Halstead Press. ISBN 978-1-920831-45-5.
- Wright, Anthony (June 1998) [1978]. Australian Carrier Decisions: the acquisition of HMA Ships Albatross, Sydney and Melbourne. Papers in Australian Maritime Affairs. Vol. 4. Canberra: Sea Power Centre. ISBN 0-642-29503-4. ISSN 1327-5658. OCLC 39641731.

=== Journal articles and reports ===
- Davies, Andrew (2009). Australian naval combat helicopters-the future. ASPI Special Report Issue 21. Canberra: Australian Strategic Policy Institute.
- Department of Defence (2 May 2009). Defending Australia in the Asia Pacific Century: Force 2030. Commonwealth of Australia. ISBN 978-0-642-29702-0. OCLC 426475923.
- Hobbs, Commander David (October 2007). "HMAS Melbourne (II) – 25 Years On". The Navy. 69 (4): 5–9. ISSN 1322-6231.
- Johnstone, Paul (April 2010). "AIR 900 Phase 8: The Seahawk Replacement". The Navy. 72 (2). Navy League of Australia: 5–9. ISSN 1322-6231.
- Norris, Guy (19 July 2010). "Battling Behemoths". Aviation Week & Space Technology. 172 (27): 130. ISSN 0005-2175.
