= 808 Naval Air Squadron =

Flying squadron of the Royal Navy's and Royal Australian Navy's Fleet Air Arm

808 Naval Air Squadron 808 Squadron RAN
- Squadron badge (top RN, bottom RAN)
- Active: 1940–1941; 1942–1945; 1950–1954; 1955–1958; 2011–
- Country: United Kingdom (1940–1941; 1942–1945); Australia (1950−1954; 1955−1958; 2011−)
- Branch: Royal Navy; Royal Australian Navy
- Type: Single-seat fighter squadron (RN); Ship based helicopter squadron (RAN)
- Role: Fleet fighter squadron (RN); Tactical transport (RAN)
- Size: squadron
- Part of: Fleet Air Arm; Fleet Air Arm (RAN)
- Home station: See Naval air stations section for full list.
- Motto: Strength in Unity
- Aircraft: See Aircraft flown section for full list.
- Engagements: World War II: Battle of the Mediterranean; Battle of Cape Spartivento; Last battle of Bismarck; Malta convoys; Battle of the Atlantic; Operation Avalanche; Operation Neptune; Operation Sunfish; Operation Dracula; Operation Balsam
- Battle honours: Mediterranean 1940; Spartivento 1940; "Bismarck" 1941; Malta Convoys 1941; Atlantic 1943; Salerno 1943; Normandy 1944; Burma 1945; East Indies 1945

Commanders
- Notable commanders: Captain Edgar Duncan Goodenough Lewin, CB, CBE, DSO, DSC & Bar, RN

Insignia
- Squadron Badge Description: Azure, five rings interlocked argent to form the figures 808 interlaced with a trident palewise or (1941)
- Identification Markings: 7A+ (Fulmar); 3A+ (Seafire); 1A+ (Spitfire); K6A+ (Hellcat on Khedive); C7A+ (Hellcat August 1944)

808 Naval Air Squadron is a ship-based helicopter squadron of the Royal Australian Navy.

808 Naval Air Squadron (808 NAS) was a Fleet Air Arm (FAA) naval air squadron of the United Kingdom's Royal Navy (RN). Originally established as a fleet fighter squadron at HMS Kestrel, RNAS Worthy Down, in July 1940, it subsequently relocated to RAF Castletown, Caithness, in September. In October of the that year, the squadron was deployed aboard HMS Ark Royal, joining Force H in the Western Mediterranean. Following the sinking of HMS Ark Royal in November 1941, the squadron was integrated into 807 Naval Air Squadron.

Re-formed at HMS Merlin, RNAS Donibristle, in January 1942, the squadron swiftly relocated to HMS Vulture, RNAS St Merryn, HMS Heron, RNAS Yeovilton and HMS Gadwall, RNAS Belfast, before boarding the escort carrier HMS Biter in September but disembarking at HMS Blackcap, RNAS Stretton. In December 1942, Supermarine Seafire aircraft were introduced, followed by a series of relocations to various shore bases, before briefly operating from HMS Battler in April 1943. Between May and June 1943 a detachment of four aircraft was deployed aboard HMS Battler as 'A' Flight to escort a convoy to Gibraltar. The squadron was then deployed on the carrier for operations in the Mediterranean in July 1943, supporting the Salerno landings. Upon returning home the squadron was assigned to the 3rd Naval Fighter Wing. It was later deployed from HMS Daedalus, RNAS Lee-on-Solent, serving with the 2nd Tactical Air Force before, during, and following the Normandy landings.

It re-equipped with Grumman Hellcat fighters in October 1944 and the unit embarked on the escort carrier HMS Khedive in January 1945 to join the Royal Navy's East Indies Fleet in April. It conducted operations off the coasts of Malaya and Sumatra and six aircraft were detached to HMS Emperor, providing air support for the liberation of Rangoon. The unit later targeted airfields in Sumatra and was present during the Japanese surrender in Malaya. It was disbanded in December 1945.

It was re-formed in 1950 as 808 Squadron RAN, a carrier-based attack squadron of the Royal Australian Navy's Fleet Air Arm, and saw action during the Korean War before disbanding again in 1958.

It was re-formed in 2011 to operate the MRH-90 Taipan helicopter.

== History ==
=== Royal Navy ===
==== Fleet fighter squadron (1940–1941) ====
808 Naval Air Squadron was formed at RNAS Worthy Down (HMS Kestrel), Hampshire, on 1 July 1940, flying twelve Fairey Fulmar reconnaissance/fighter aircraft, in the role of a Fleet Fighter squadron, under the command of Lieutenant H.E.R. Torin, RN.

===== Battle of Britain =====
They were initially assigned to the Isle of Man to carry out patrols over the Irish Sea, but were soon transferred to Wick for the defence of the dockyards, the safeguarding the Royal Navy's primary operational base during wartime at Scapa Flow. Following this, the squadron was reassigned to RAF Fighter Command and was one of only two Allied naval aviation squadrons to take part in the Battle of Britain, the other being 804 Naval Air Squadron.

===== Ark Royal =====
In September 1940, the squadron was assigned to the aircraft carrier, HMS Ark Royal, which was part of the Royal Navy formation, Force H, operating in the Mediterranean. The squadron shot down two enemy aircraft in an attack on Sardinia in November, followed by another two in operations over Sicily in January 1941, and a fifth while defending Malta in May. The carrier was reassigned to the Atlantic in late May, as part of the hunt for the German battleship Bismarck. Following the successful sinking of the Bismarck, the carrier returned to the Mediterranean, with 807 and 808 Squadrons claiming fifteen aerial kills during July and August. 808 Squadron was embarked when Ark Royal was torpedoed and sunk by the U-81 on 13 November 1941. Although all of the squadron personnel survived the sinking, many of the aircraft were lost in the attack: the surviving aircraft were flown from Ark Royal before the carrier sank and on arrival in Gibraltar were merged with the survivors of 807 Naval Air Squadron, which had also been embarked.

==== Fleet fighter squadron (1942–1945) ====
808 Naval Air Squadron reformed at RNAS Donibristle (HMS Merlin), Fife, on 1 January 1942, with six Fairey Fulmar Mk II aircraft, the squadron rapidly relocated to RNAS St Merryn (HMS Vulture), Cornwall, RNAS Yeovilton (HMS Heron), Somerset and RNAS Belfast (HMS Gadwall), County Antrim, before boarding the escort carrier HMS Biter in September, subsequently disembarking at RNAS Stretton (HMS Blackcap), Cheshire.

===== Convoy protection =====
In December 1942, nine Supermarine Seafire L Mk.IIc fighter aircraft were introduced, followed by a series of relocations to various shore bases, including RNAS Charlton Horethorne (HMS Heron II), Somerset, RAF Peterhead, Aberdeenshire, RNAS Machrihanish (HMS Landrail), Argyll and Bute and RNAS St Merryn (HMS Vulture), before briefly operating from the Attacker-class escort carrier HMS Battler, in April 1943. Between May and June 1943, while stationed at RNAS Yeovilton and later RAF Turnhouse, Edinburgh, a detachment of four aircraft was deployed aboard HMS Battler as 'A' Flight to escort a convoy to Gibraltar. The purpose was to offer protection for convoy OS.49/KMS.16, which departed from Liverpool on 4 June. On 10 June, two Supermarine Seafire aircraft from 808 'A' Flight were lost. During the return journey to the United Kingdom, HMS Battler served as an extra escort for convoy XK.9, which left Gibraltar on 22 June. This convoy attracted increased attention from the Luftwaffe, resulting in two Supermarine Seafire fighters from 808 'A' Flight downing a Focke-Wulf Fw 200 Condor on 22 June.

The entire squadron was then deployed on the carrier for operations in the Mediterranean in July 1943, supporting the Salerno landings. Upon returning home in sister ship HMS Hunter, the squadron integrated into the 3rd Naval Fighter Wing, focusing on training for close support operations at RNAS Burscough (HMS Ringtail), Lancashire.

===== D-Day =====
The Squadron was re-equipped in May 1944 at RNAS Lee-on-Solent (HMS Daedalus) with 20 Supermarine Seafire L Mk.III. At the same time, they were attached to No. 345 Reconnaissance Wing of the Royal Air Force Second Tactical Air Force. While part of this wing, 808 Naval Air Squadron, along with three other FAA squadrons (885, 886 and 897 Naval Air Squadrons) and also two RAF squadrons (26 and 63 Squadrons), plus the United States Navy (USN) artillery observation aircraft squadron VCS-7, flying Supermarine Spitfire Mk Vb fighters, provided valuable target coordinates and fire control for RN and USN battleships and cruisers, during 20 days of operations during the Normandy Landings. On D-Day, "pooling" of the spotting units' aircraft meant that all units flew either Spitfires or Seafires. This role of "spotters" lasted until 26 June, by which time the fighting was too far inland to be covered by the ship's guns.

===== East Indies fleet =====
The squadron relocated to RNAS Ballyhalbert, County Down, where it underwent re-equipment with twenty-four Grumman Hellcat fighter aircraft in October. An American carrier-based fighter aircraft, these were the F6F-3, which had the Pratt & Whitney R-2800 Double Wasp engine and the F6F-5 with the R-2800-10W engine, designated Hellcat F. Mk. I and F. Mk. II respectively by the Fleet Air Arm. In January 1945, it embarked in the Ruler-class escort carrier, HMS Khedive and proceeded to integrate into the East Indies Fleet, with the squadron disembarking to RNAS Katukurunda (HMS Ukussa), Ceylon, on the 7 February.

In April, aerial patrols, reconnaissance, and maritime assaults were conducted during operations near Malaya and Sumatra, with four aircraft temporarily deployed on sister ship HMS Emperor for a strike mission. During Operation Sunfish, 808 Naval Air Squadron, operating from HMS Khedive, accomplished a total of one hundred and thirteen sorties, of which eighty-two were expedited, accumulating a total of 203 hours and 49 minutes of flight time. The detachment aboard HMS Emperor logged 52 hours and 35 minutes of flight time. The squadron experienced losses of four Grumman Hellcats due to deck mishaps, resulting in the fatalities of two pilots. In terms of enemy losses, four aircraft were destroyed in aerial engagements, with one additional aircraft classified as probable and two others sustaining damage. Furthermore, five enemy aircraft were reported damaged on the ground.

In May, aerial support was rendered for Operation Dracula, which aimed at the liberation of Rangoon (now Yangon), Burma (now Myanmar). Between April 25 and May 6, the squadron conducted seventy-five sorties, accumulating a total of 110 hours and 35 minutes of flight time. Of these, thirty-two sorties were initiated using the ship's catapult. The squadron suffered losses on the 25 April, including the death of one pilot and the destruction of three Grumman Hellcat aircraft.

A comparable operation was conducted during anti-shipping assaults in the Andaman Sea, which was succeeded in June by attacks on airfields in Sumatra. During the air strikes on the Andaman Islands, HMS Emperor deployed four Grumman Hellcats, each equipped with eight 60lb rockets, to locate and engage the SS Kuroshyio Maru. Additionally, six more Grumman Hellcats from HMS Khedive were dispatched to target the airfield at Lhokseumawe in Northern Sumatra. Operation Balsam followed which involved additional assaults on airfields in Sumatra, specifically targeting the facilities at Lhoksemawe, Medan, and Binjai on the 20, utilising the Grumman Hellcats from the 808 Naval Air Squadron amongst others.

Subsequent to V-J Day, support was rendered throughout the occupation of Malaya, later, aircraft landed at RNARY Coimbatore (HMS Garuda), Ceylon and personnel only travelled aboard HMS Khedive to the United Kingdom, where the squadron was officially disbanded upon its arrival on 5 December.

=== Royal Australian Navy ===
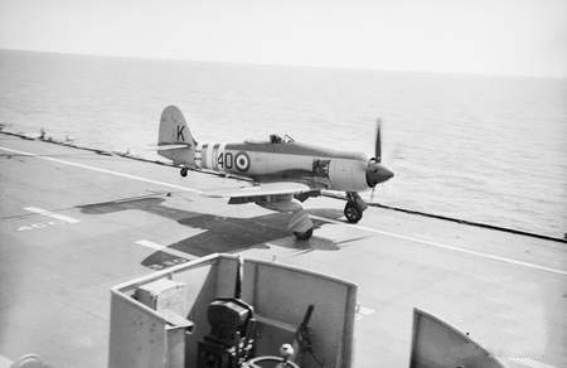
Sea Fury of 808 Squadron landing on HMAS Sydney during the Korean War

808 Squadron was re-formed on 25 April 1950 at RNAS St Merryn, equipped with Hawker Sea Furies and assigned to operate with the Royal Australian Navy. The squadron was embarked aboard HMAS Sydney as part of the 21st Carrier Air Group.

808 Squadron was one of three RAN squadrons embarked aboard Sydney during her deployment to the Korean War. 808 Squadron's tour of Korea primarily consisted of combat air patrols, ground attack support, armed reconnaissance, and anti-shipping strikes. In 1954, the squadron was decommissioned, but was re-formed a year later, equipped with de Havilland Sea Venom FAW.53s, and assigned to the new Australian carrier, HMAS Melbourne. 808 Squadron remained in service for three years, and was finally decommissioned on 1 December 1958.

808 Squadron re-formed in 2011 to operate the RAN's six MRH90 helicopters. The squadron was formally recommissioned on 11 July 2013. In April 2022, the RAN ceased flying the MRH90 and the fleet was placed into storage.

After the MRH90 were retired, 808 Squadron was re-rolled to operate MH-60R Seahawk helicopters.

== Aircraft flown ==
The squadron has flown a number of different aircraft types.

=== Royal Navy ===
List of aircraft, variants and dates used:

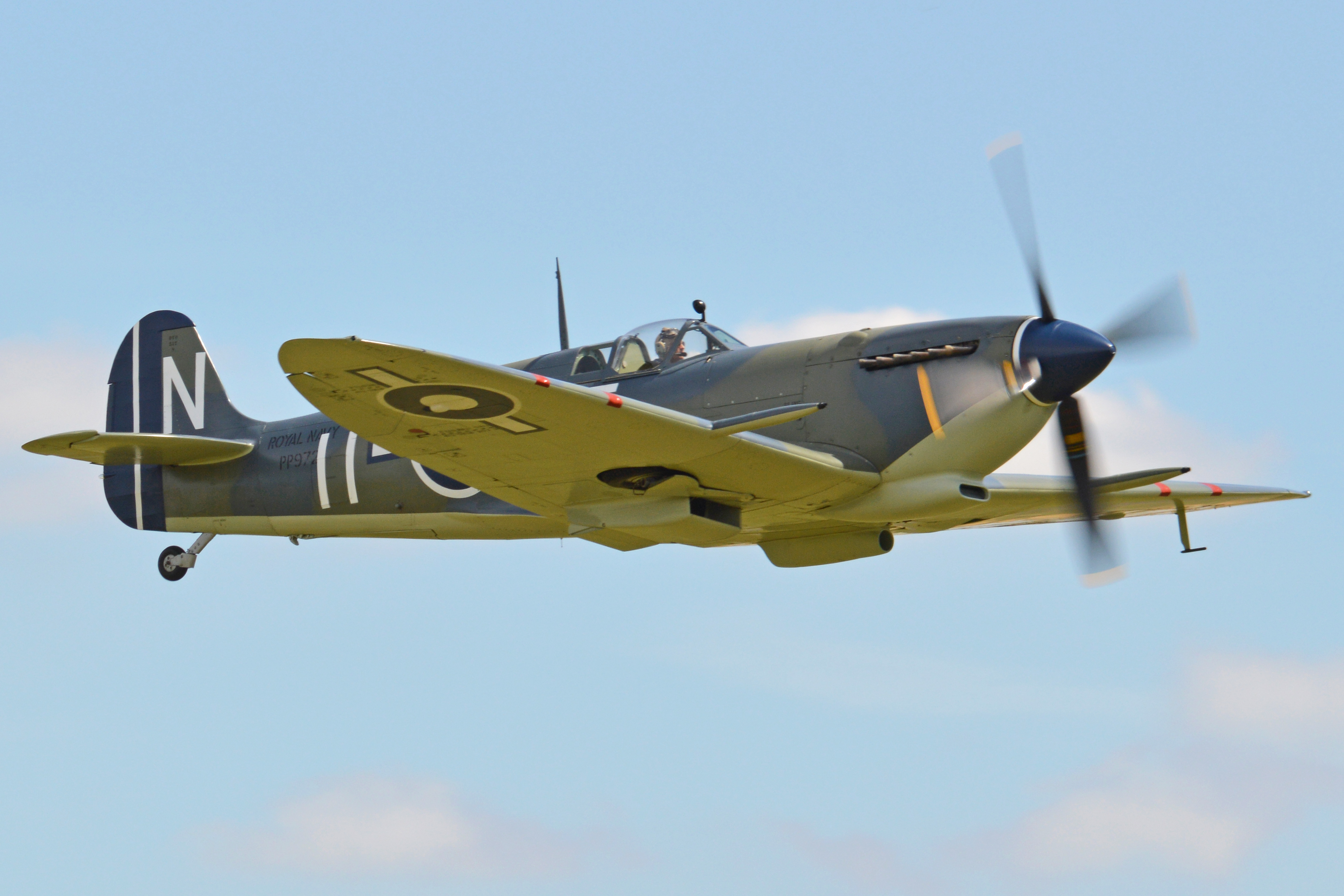
Supermarine Seafire L Mk.III

- Fairey Fulmar Mk.I reconnaissance/fighter aircraft (July 1940 - August 1941)
- Fairey Fulmar Mk.II reconnaissance/fighter aircraft ( - November 1941, January - November 1942)
- Supermarine Spitfire Mk Vb/hooked fighter aircraft (December 1942 - April 1943)
- Supermarine Seafire L Mk.IIc fighter aircraft (December 1942 - May 1944)
- Supermarine Spitfire Mk Vb fighter aircraft (February - May 1944)
- Supermarine Spitfire PR Mk XIII photo-reconnaissance aircraft (March 1944)
- Supermarine Spitfire L Mk Vb fighter aircraft (May - July 1944)
- Supermarine Seafire L Mk.III fighter aircraft (June - October 1944)
- Grumman Hellcat F. Mk. I fighter aircraft (October 1944 - March 1945)
- Grumman Hellcat F. Mk. II fighter aircraft (October 1944 - November 1945)

=== Royal Australian Navy ===
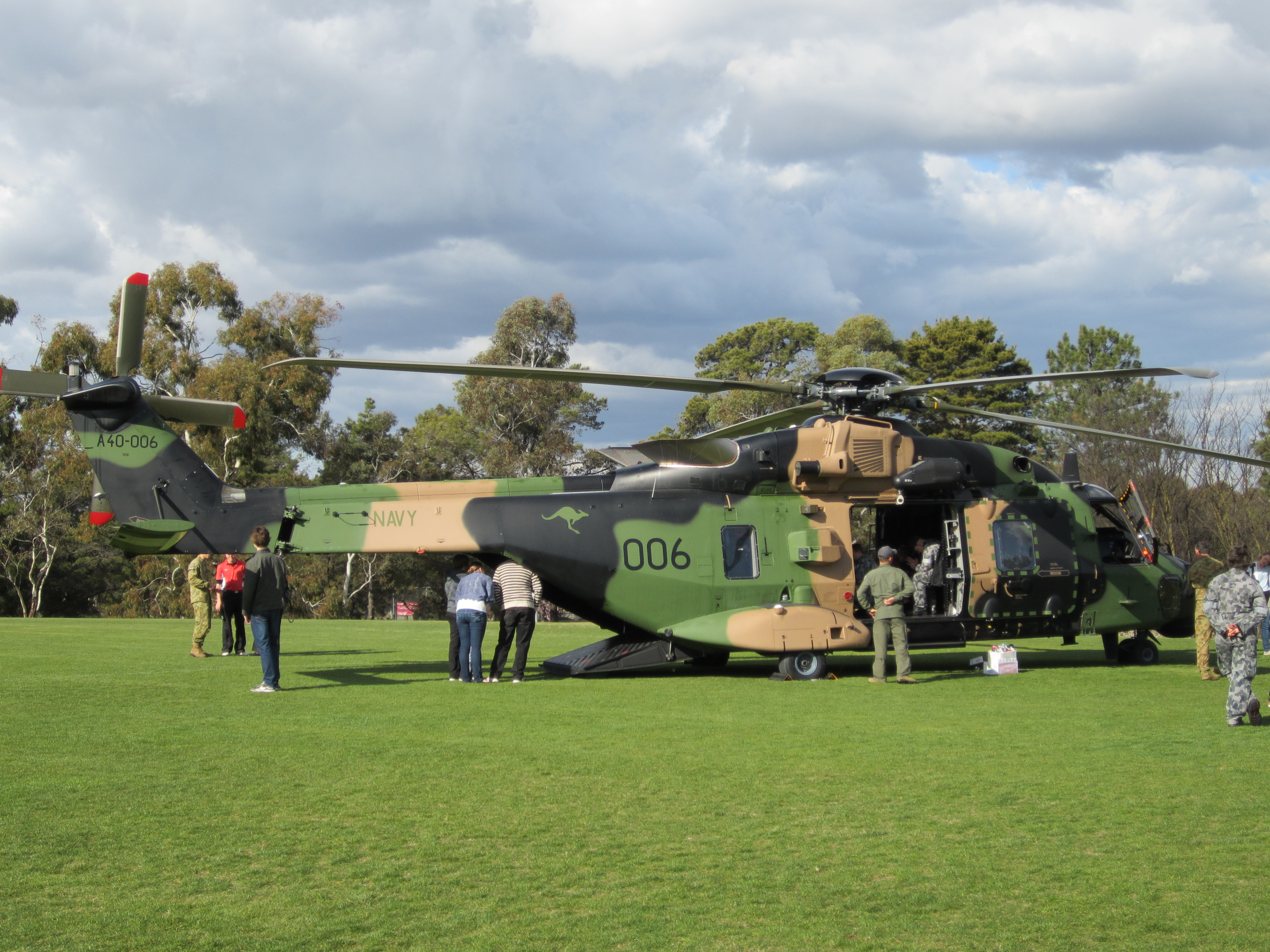
One of 808 Squadron's MRH90s in 2011

==== Helicopters (2010s) ====
- MRH90

==== Korean War (1950s) ====
- Hawker Sea Fury Mk II
- de Havilland Sea Venom FAW.53

== Battle honours ==
The Royal Navy battle honours awarded to 808 Naval Air Squadron are:

- Mediterranean 1940-41
- Spartivento 1940
- "Bismarck" 1941
- Malta Convoys 1941
- Atlantic 1943
- Salerno 1943
- Normandy 1944
- Burma 1945
- East Indies 1945

== Assignments ==
808 Naval Air Squadron was assigned as needed to form part of a number of larger units:

- 3rd Naval Fighter Wing (25 October 1943 - 9 December 1945)

== Naval air stations ==
808 Naval Air Squadron was active at various naval air stations of the Royal Navy and Royal Air Force stations, both within the United Kingdom and internationally. Additionally, it operated from a Royal Navy fleet and several escort carriers, as well as other airbases located abroad.

=== World War Two air stations and aircraft carriers ===
List of air stations and aircraft carriers used by 808 Naval Air Squadron during World War two including dates:

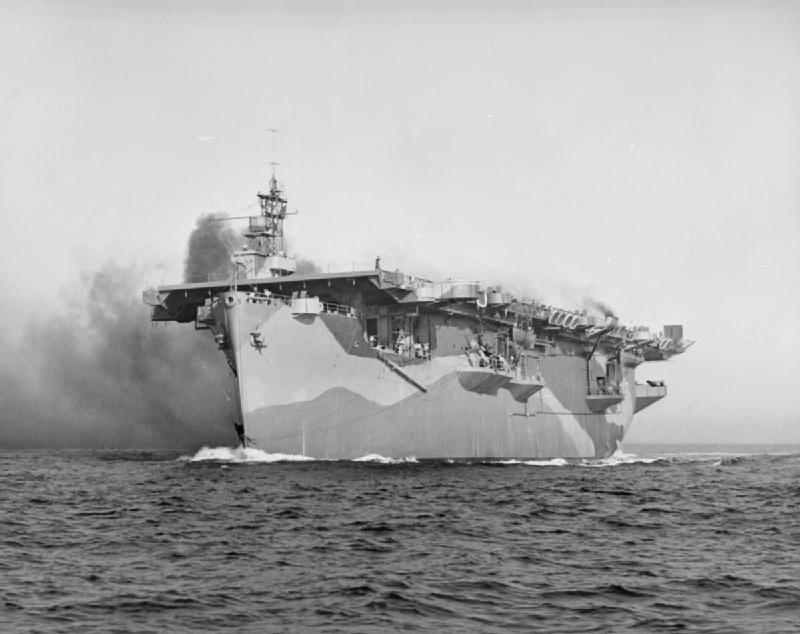
HMS Battler

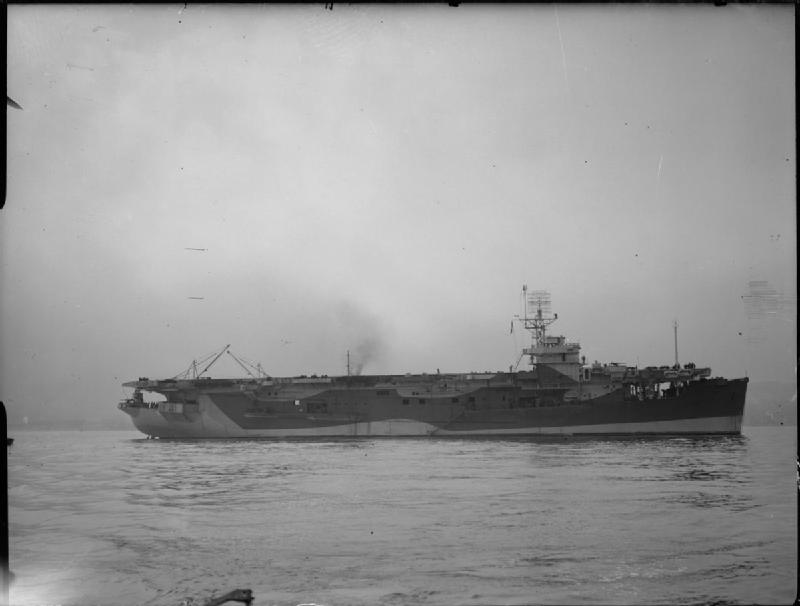
HMS Khedive

1940 - 1941

- Royal Naval Air Station Worthy Down (HMS Kestrel), Hampshire. (1 July - 5 September 1940)
- Royal Air Force Castletown, Caithness. (5 September - 2 October 1940)
- Royal Naval Air Station Donibristle (HMS Merlin), Fife. (2 - 31 October 1940)
- HMS Ark Royal (31 October - 13 November 1940)
- ship sunk - (13 November 1941)

1942 - 1945

- Royal Naval Air Station Donibristle (HMS Merlin), Fife. (1 January - 17 March 1942)
- Royal Naval Air Station St Merryn (HMS Vulture), Cornwall. (17 March - 18 April 1942)
- Royal Naval Air Station Yeovilton (HMS Heron), Somerset. (18 April - 30 May 1942)
- Royal Naval Air Station Belfast (HMS Gadwall), County Antrim. (30 May - 2 September 1942)
- HMS Biter (2 - 29 September 1942)
- Royal Naval Air Station Stretton (HMS Blackcap), Cheshire. (29 September - 16 October 1942)
- Royal Air Force Andreas, Isle of Man. (16 - 20 October 1942)
- Royal Air Force Peterhead, Aberdeenshire. (20 - 24 October 1942)
- Royal Naval Air Station Machrihanish (HMS Landrail), Argyll and Bute. (24 October - 20 November 1942)
- Royal Naval Air Station Stretton (HMS Blackcap), Cheshire. (20 November - 11 December 1942)
- Royal Naval Air Station Charlton Horethorne (HMS Heron II), Somerset. (11 December 1942 - 8 January 1943)
- Royal Naval Air Station St Merryn (HMS Vulture), Cornwal. (8 January - 9 September 1943)
- Royal Naval Air Station Machrihanish (HMS Landrail), Argyll and Bute. (9 February - 10 April 1943)
- HMS Battler (10 April - 7 May 1943)
- Royal Naval Air Station Donibristle (HMS Merlin), Fife. (7 - 20 May 1943)
  - HMS Battler (Detachment three aircraft 7 - 11 May 1943)
- Royal Naval Air Station Yeovilton (HMS Heron), Somerset. (20 May - 14 June 1943)
  - HMS Battler (Detachment four aircraft 6 - 29 June 1943)
- Royal Air Force Turnhouse, Edinburgh. (14 June - 20 July 1943)
- Royal Air Force Andover, Hampshire. (20 - 30 July 1943)
- HMS Battler (30 July - 29 August 1943)
- Royal Naval Air Station Machrihanish (HMS Landrail), Argyll and Bute. (29 - 30 August 1943)
- HMS Battler (30 August - 17 September 1943)
  - Paestum Airfield, Campania, Italy. (Detachment 12 - 17 September 1943)
- HMS Hunter (17 - 23 September 1943)
- RN Air Section Gibraltar, Gibraltar. (23 September - 1 October 1943)
- HMS Hunter (1 - 6 October 1943)
- Royal Naval Air Station Burscough (HMS Ringtail), Lancashire. (6 October 1943 - 21 January 1944)
- HMS Hunter (21 January - 25 February 1944)
- Royal Naval Air Station Lee-on-Solent (HMS Daedalus), Hampshire. (25 February - 7 March 1944)
- Royal Naval Air Station Henstridge (HMS Dipper), Somerset. (7 - 31 March 1944)
- Royal Naval Air Station St Merryn (HMS Vulture), Cornwall. (31 March - 11 April 1944)
- Royal Naval Air Station Henstridge (HMS Dipper), Somerset. (11 - 22 April 1944)
- Royal Air Force Dundonald, South Ayrshire. (22 April - 6 May 1944)
- Royal Naval Air Station Ayr (HMS Wagtail), South Ayrshire. (6 - 14 May 1944)
- Royal Naval Air Station Lee-on-Solent (HMS Daedalus), Hampshire. (14 May - 4 August 1944)
- Royal Naval Air Station Ayr (HMS Wagtail), South Ayrshire. (4 -9 August 1944)
- Royal Naval Air Station Ballyhalbert, County Down. (9 August - 1 September 1944)
  - Royal Naval Air Station Kirkistown, County Down. (Aerodrome Dummy Deck Landings (ADDLs) 21 August 1944)
- Royal Air Force Hawarden, Flintshire. (1 - 25 September 1944)
- Royal Air Force Boulmer, Northumberland. (25 - 26 September 1944)
- Royal Naval Air Station Eglinton (HMS Gannet), County Londonderry. (26 - 28 September 1944)
- Royal Air Force Hawarden, Flintshire. (28 September - 12 October 1944)
- Royal Naval Air Station Ballyhalbert, County Down. (12 October 1944 - 4 January 1945)
- HMS Smiter (Deck Landing Training (DLT) (4 - 5 January 1945)
- HMS Khedive (5 January - 7 February 1945)
- Royal Naval Air Station Katukurunda (HMS Ukussa), Ceylon. (7 February - 16 March 1945)
- HMS Khedive (16 March - 5 April 1945)
- Royal Naval Air Station Trincomalee (HMS Bambara), Ceylon. (5 -6 April 1945)
- HMS Khedive (6 - 21 April 1945)
  - HMS Emperor (Detachment four aircraft 4 - 20 April 1945)
- Royal Naval Air Station Colombo Racecourse (HMS Berhunda), Ceylon. (21 - 23 April 1945)
- HMS Khedive (23 April - 19 May 1945)
- Royal Naval Air Station Colombo Racecourse (HMS Berhunda), Ceylon. (19 May - 14 June 1945)
- HMS Khedive (14 - 23 June 1945)
- Royal Naval Air Station Trincomalee (HMS Bambara), Ceylon. (23 June - 11 July 1945)
- HMS Khedive (11 - 21 July 1945)
- Royal Naval Air Station Puttalam (HMS Rajaliya), Ceylon. (21 July - 5 August 1945)
- HMS Khedive (5 August - 18 September 1945)
- Royal Naval Aircraft Repair Yard Coimbatore (HMS Garuda), Tamil Nadu, India. (18 September - 8 November 1945)
- HMS Khedive (crews) (8 November - 5 December 1945)
- disbanded UK - (5 December 1945)

== Commanding officers ==
List of commanding officers of 808 Naval Air Squadron:

1940 - 1941

- Lieutenant H.E.R. Torin, RN, from 1 July 1940
- Lieutenant Commander R.C. Tillard, RN, from 20 July 1940 (KiA 8 May 1941)
- Lieutenant Commander E.D.G. Lewin, DSC, RN, from 31 May 1941
- disbanded - 13 November 1941

1942 - 1945

- Lieutenant C.P. Campbell-Horsfall, RN, from 1 January 1942
- Lieutenant Commander(A) A.C. Wallace, RNVR, from 17 March 1943
- Lieutenant Commander(A) J.F. Rankin, DSC, RN, from 25 October 1943
- Lieutenant Commander(A) O.F. Wheatley, RNVR, 20 May 1945 (KiA 20 June 1945)
- Lieutenant Commander(A) R.F. Bryant, RN, from 25 June 1945
- disbanded - 5 December 1945

Note: Abbreviation (A) signifies Air Branch of the RN or RNVR.

== See also ==
- List of Battle of Britain squadrons
- Ronald Cuthbert Hay - British naval aviator, the only Royal Marine fighter ace and a former 808 Squadron pilot
- Giles Guthrie - English aviator, merchant banker and an airline industry executive, and former 808 Squadron pilot
