= 3rd Naval Fighter Wing =

Royal Navy Fleet Air Arm aircraft wing

- White Ensign
- Active: 25 October 1943 – 9 October 1945
- Country: United Kingdom
- Branch: Royal Navy
- Type: Wing
- Role: Fighter and tactical reconnaissance; air spotting
- Size: Three / four squadrons
- Part of: Fleet Air Arm
- Engagements: World War II: European theatre of World War II; Normandy landings; Pacific War

Commanders
- Notable commanders: See list of Wing Leaders

Insignia
- Wing Code: K

Aircraft flown
- Fighter: Supermarine Seafire; Grumman Hellcat; Grumman Wildcat

3rd Naval Fighter Wing ("3 Wing") was a Fleet Air Arm (FAA) formation of the Royal Navy (RN) during the Second World War. Formed at RNAS Burscough on 25 October 1943, it initially comprised 808, 886 and 897 Naval Air Squadrons, operating Supermarine Seafire fighters in a tactical reconnaissance role. The wing moved to RNAS Lee-on-Solent in February 1944 and subsequently operated as an air spotting pool supporting the Second Tactical Air Force during the Normandy landings.

Following a reorganisation in July 1944, the wing moved to RAF Ballyhalbert and was progressively re-equipped with Grumman Hellcat fighters. By late 1944 it comprised 800, 808, 885 and 1840 Naval Air Squadrons. The four squadrons subsequently deployed separately in escort carriers to the East Indies Fleet and British Pacific Fleet. The wing's recorded command chronology continued into 1945, although its constituent squadrons were subsequently disbanded or absorbed at different dates. The 3rd Naval Fighter Wing was disbanded on 9 October 1945.

== History ==
=== Formation and reconnaissance role ===
The 3rd Naval Fighter Wing was formed at RNAS Burscough on 25 October 1943 with 808, 886 and 897 Naval Air Squadrons. The squadrons were equipped with the Supermarine Seafire fighter aircraft and the wing was initially intended for tactical reconnaissance. Its squadrons also operated periodically from escort carriers, including HMS Hunter, HMS Attacker and HMS Stalker.

A line of Supermarine Seafire fighters at RNAS Lee-on-Solent

886 Naval Air Squadron joined the wing at RNAS Burscough during October 1943 and subsequently undertook aerial reconnaissance and spotting training. 808 and 897 Squadrons also formed part of the wing's initial reconnaissance organisation.

The wing moved to RNAS Lee-on-Solent, Hampshire, on 25 February 1944. 808 Naval Air Squadron had disembarked from HMS Hunter and moved to RNAS Lee-on-Solent, where it was joined by 885 Naval Air Squadron, which had been formed at the station in February. The wing's role subsequently changed from tactical reconnaissance to that of an air spotting pool attached to the Second Tactical Air Force, in preparation for the Allied invasion of Normandy.

During the Normandy landings in June 1944, the wing's Supermarine Seafires provided reconnaissance and artillery-spotting support for the Allied forces ashore. 886 and 897 Squadrons subsequently ceased to exist as independent components of the wing: 808 Squadron absorbed 886 Squadron, while 885 Squadron absorbed 897 Squadron during July 1944.

=== Reorganisation and Ballyhalbert ===
The wing was reconstituted during July 1944 and moved to RAF Ballyhalbert in County Down, Northern Ireland, on 4 August. Its role increasingly changed from the reconnaissance and spotting duties of its original Supermarine Seafire squadrons towards carrier fighter operations.

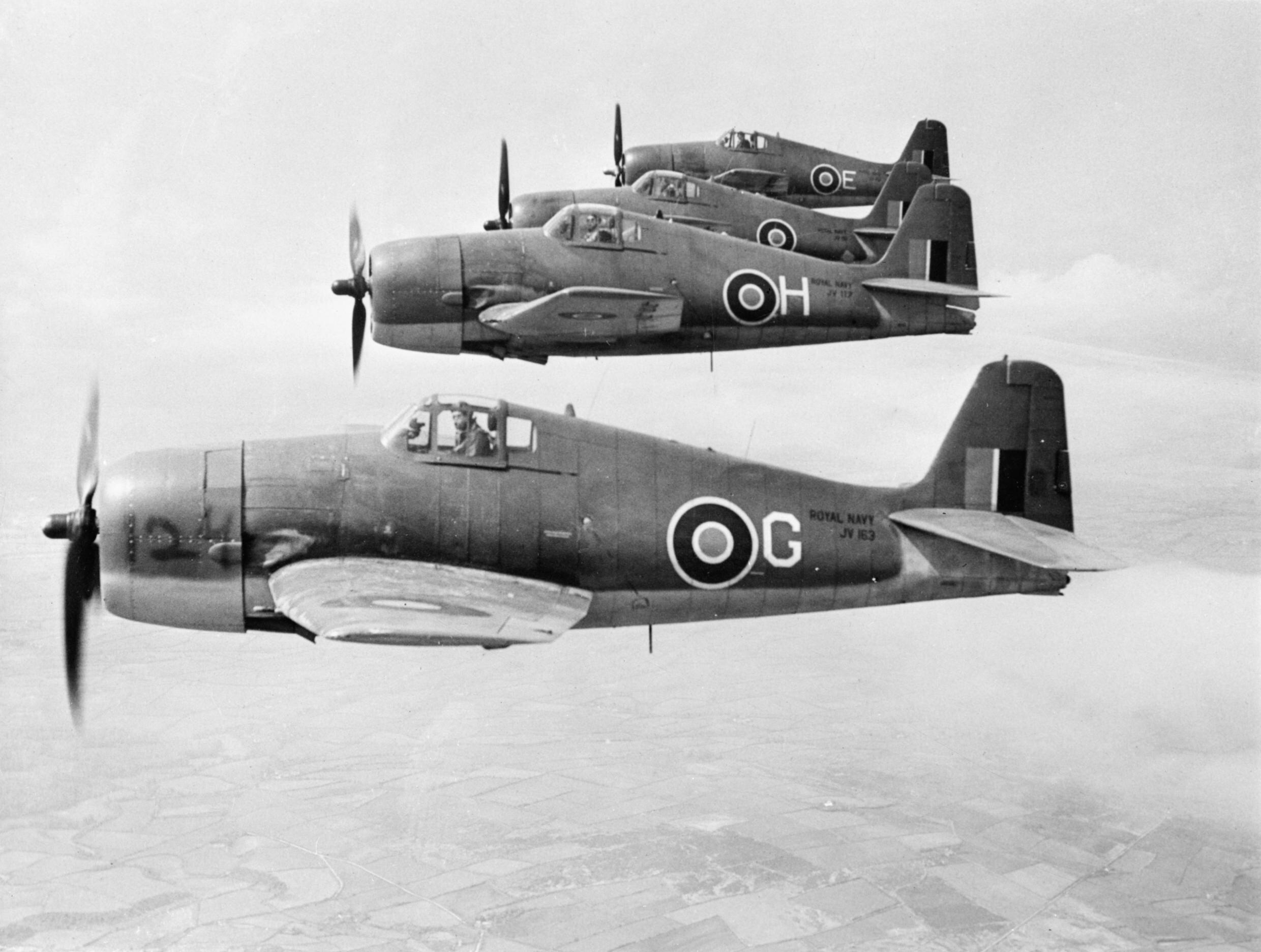
Grumman Hellcats of 1840 Squadron from RNAS Eglinton, 23 June 1944

808 and 885 Naval Air Squadrons were re-equipped with Grumman Hellcat fighters. The wing was subsequently expanded with the addition of 800 and 1840 Naval Air Squadrons. 1840 Squadron had originally formed at RNAS Burscough in March 1944 as a Grumman Hellcat squadron and later joined the 3rd Naval Fighter Wing at RNAS Eglinton, County Londonderry, during September 1944.

In October 1944, 881 and 882 Naval Air Squadrons, equipped with Grumman Wildcat fighters, were attached to the wing for approximately three weeks. Their temporary association reflected the flexible organisation of wartime naval air wings, whose composition could change according to operational requirements.

By the end of 1944 the wing had become a Grumman Hellcat formation comprising 800, 808, 885 and 1840 Naval Air Squadrons. The four squadrons were allocated to different escort carriers for overseas service rather than deploying as a single embarked formation.

=== Overseas deployment ===
In late 1944 and early 1945 the wing's four principal squadrons deployed separately in four Ruler-class escort carriers. 800 Squadron embarked in HMS Emperor, 808 Squadron in HMS Khedive, 885 Squadron in HMS Ruler and 1840 Squadron in HMS Speaker.

The four escort carriers subsequently operated within the naval forces supporting British operations in the Indian Ocean and Pacific theatres. The separation of the squadrons meant that the wing no longer operated as a single tactical group, although the 3rd Naval Fighter Wing remained an identifiable administrative formation in Fleet Air Arm records.

==== 800 Naval Air Squadron — HMS Emperor ====
Grumman Hellcats on HMS Emperor

800 Naval Air Squadron joined the 3rd Naval Fighter Wing in October 1944. It subsequently embarked in HMS Emperor as part of the wing's deployment to the Indian Ocean and East Indies Fleet.

==== 808 Naval Air Squadron — HMS Khedive ====
808 Naval Air Squadron embarked in HMS Khedive and served with the East Indies Fleet. HMS Khedive joined the 21st Aircraft Carrier Squadron at Trincomalee, Ceylon, in February 1945, and 808 Squadron subsequently took part in operations against Japanese forces in the Indian Ocean and South East Asia.

During April 1945 the squadron took part in Operation Sunfish, conducting sorties from HMS Khedive. It subsequently supported operations in the Andaman Sea and attacks against Japanese airfields in Sumatra, including operations associated with Operation Balsam. Following the Japanese surrender, its aircraft supported the Allied occupation of Malaya before the squadron returned to the United Kingdom aboard HMS Khedive. 808 Naval Air Squadron was disbanded on 5 December 1945.

==== 885 Naval Air Squadron — HMS Ruler ====
885 Naval Air Squadron embarked in HMS Ruler in December 1944. The carrier subsequently deployed to the Indian Ocean and joined the British Pacific Fleet in April 1945.

During operations in the Pacific, 885 Squadron provided fighter and anti-submarine protection for ships of the British Pacific Fleet's Fleet Train. HMS Ruler and her aircraft also supported the fleet during the Okinawa campaign. The squadron subsequently operated from shore establishments and returned to HMS Ruler before being disbanded on 27 September 1945.

==== 1840 Naval Air Squadron — HMS Speaker ====
1840 Naval Air Squadron joined the 3rd Naval Fighter Wing at RNAS Eglinton during September 1944. In December it embarked in HMS Speaker, which sailed from the United Kingdom in January 1945 for service with the British Pacific Fleet.

HMS Speaker operated as a combat air patrol carrier supporting the British Pacific Fleet's logistic support group. After reaching the Pacific, 1840 Squadron provided fighter cover for the fleet train during replenishment operations supporting Operation Iceberg, the Allied campaign against the Japanese-held Ryukyu Islands.

The squadron was disbanded aboard HMS Speaker on 27 April 1945. Its personnel and aircraft were redistributed among other Fleet Air Arm units, including 1839 Naval Air Squadron.

=== Disbandment ===
The operational histories of the wing's constituent squadrons diverged during 1945. 1840 Squadron was disbanded in April, while 885 Squadron was disbanded in September and 808 Squadron in December. The wing itself, however, remained in the Fleet Air Arm's organisational structure until its recorded disbandment on 9 October 1945.

== Squadrons ==
3rd Naval Fighter Wing consisted of a number of Fleet Air Arm squadrons:

- 808 Naval Air Squadron, October 1943 - October 1945
- 886 Naval Air Squadron, October 1943 - July 1944
- 897 Naval Air Squadron, October 1943 - July 1944
- 885 Naval Air Squadron, February 1944 - September 1945
- 800 Naval Air Squadron, August 1944 - October 1945
- 1840 Naval Air Squadron, August 1944 - October 1945
- 881 Naval Air Squadron, October 1944
- 882 Naval Air Squadron, October 1944

== Naval air stations and carrier deployments ==
The 3rd Naval Fighter Wing operated from a number of Royal Naval Air Stations and other airfields during its formation, training and operational service. Its constituent squadrons were sometimes deployed independently, particularly during the wing's overseas deployment in 1945.

- Royal Naval Air Station Burscough (HMS Ringtail), Lancashire.
  - The wing was formed at RNAS Burscough on 25 October 1943 with 808, 886 and 897 Naval Air Squadrons, initially undertaking tactical reconnaissance duties.
- Royal Naval Air Station Lee-on-Solent (HMS Daedalus), Hampshire.
  - The wing moved to Lee-on-Solent on 25 February 1944. 808 Squadron moved there from HMS Hunter, while 885 Naval Air Squadron was formed at the station and joined the wing. 886 and 897 Squadrons operated from RNAS Lee-on-Solent as part of the Air Spotting Pool attached to the Second Tactical Air Force during preparations for and the Normandy landings.
- Royal Naval Air Station Ayr (HMS Wagtail), South Ayrshire.
  - 808 and 885 Squadrons operated from RNAS Ayr during May 1944, while 1840 Squadron subsequently used the station for training and re-equipment with Grumman F6F Hellcat fighters.
- RN Air Section Ballyhalbert, County Londonderry.
  - The wing moved to RAF Ballyhalbert on 4 August 1944 following its reorganisation. 808 and 885 Squadrons were re-equipped with Grumman Hellcats, while 800 and 1840 Squadrons subsequently joined the wing. 881 and 882 Squadrons were temporarily attached to the wing for approximately three weeks in October 1944.
- Royal Naval Air Station Eglinton (HMS Gannet), County Londonderry.
  - 1840 Squadron joined the wing at RNAS Eglinton during September 1944 before subsequently moving south and preparing for its deployment aboard HMS Speaker.
- HMS Emperor
  - 800 Naval Air Squadron joined the 3rd Naval Fighter Wing in October 1944 and subsequently embarked in HMS Emperor. By early 1945 it formed part of the wing's deployment of Grumman Hellcat squadrons to the East Indies Fleet.
- HMS Khedive
  - 808 Naval Air Squadron embarked in HMS Khedive for service with the East Indies Fleet. The squadron subsequently participated in Operation Sunfish, Operation Dracula and attacks against Japanese positions in Sumatra. HMS Khedive and 808 Squadron also supported subsequent occupation operations following the Japanese surrender.
- HMS Ruler
  - 885 Naval Air Squadron embarked in HMS Ruler in December 1944. The carrier subsequently joined the British Pacific Fleet in April 1945, with 885 Squadron providing fighter and anti-submarine protection for the British Pacific Fleet's Fleet Train and participating in operations supporting the Battle of Okinawa.
- HMS Speaker
  - 1840 Naval Air Squadron embarked in HMS Speaker in December 1944. The escort carrier sailed for the Far East in January 1945 and subsequently operated with the British Pacific Fleet, with 1840 Squadron providing fighter protection for the fleet's auxiliary and support ships. The squadron was disbanded into 1839 Naval Air Squadron on 27 April 1945.

By early 1945, the wing's four principal Grumman Hellcat squadrons had therefore been distributed among separate escort carriers: 800 Squadron in HMS Emperor, 808 Squadron in HMS Khedive, 885 Squadron in HMS Ruler and 1840 Squadron in HMS Speaker. The squadrons consequently operated within the wider carrier and fleet organisation rather than as a single embarked wing.

== Aircraft ==
Naval Air Squadrons assigned to 3 Wing flew different variants of three aircraft types:

- Supermarine Seafire L Mk.IIc fighter aircraft (1943 - 1944)
- Supermarine Seafire L Mk.III fighter aircraft (1944)
- Supermarine Seafire F MK.III fighter aircraft (1944)
- Grumman Hellcat F. Mk. I fighter aircraft (1944 - 1945)
- Grumman Hellcat F. Mk. II fighter aircraft (1944 - 1945)
- Grumman Wildcat Mk VI fighter aircraft (1944)
- Grumman Wildcat Mk V fighter aircraft (1944)

== Wing leader ==
The wing's recorded commanding officer chronology was:

- Lieutenant Commander(A) S.J. Hall, RN, from 25 October 1943
- Commander(A) R.McD. Hall, RN, from 13 March 1944
- Commander(A) N.G. Hallett, DSC, RN, from 22 May 1944
- Lieutenant Commander R.H.P. Carver, DSC, RN, from 30 September 1944
- Lieutenant Commander B.H.C. Nation, RN, from 16 November 1944
- Major P.P. Nelson-Gracie, RM, from 11 February 1945
- Lieutenant Commander R.H.P. Carver, DSC, RN, from 8 April 1945
- disbanded — 9 October 1945

The repeated appointment of Carver reflects the changing administrative circumstances of the wing during its overseas deployment. By 1945 the wing's squadrons were operating separately in escort carriers and other Fleet Air Arm formations.

Note: Abbreviation (A) signifies Air Branch of the RN or RNVR.

== See also ==
- Fleet Air Arm
- List of aircraft wings of the Royal Navy
- 808 Naval Air Squadron
- 886 Naval Air Squadron
- 897 Naval Air Squadron
- 885 Naval Air Squadron
- 800 Naval Air Squadron
- 1840 Naval Air Squadron
- 881 Naval Air Squadron
- 882 Naval Air Squadron
- HMS Hunter
- HMS Attacker
- HMS Stalker
- HMS Emperor
- HMS Khedive
- HMS Ruler
- HMS Speaker
- Supermarine Seafire
- Grumman Hellcat
- Grumman Wildcat

== Bibliography ==
- Ballance, Theo; Howard, Lee; Sturtivant, Ray (2016). The Squadrons and Units of the Fleet Air Arm. Air-Britain Historians. ISBN 978-0-85130-489-2.
- Sturtivant, Ray; Ballance, Theo (1994). The Squadrons of the Fleet Air Arm. Air-Britain (Historians). ISBN 0-85130-223-8.
- Wragg, David (2019). The Fleet Air Arm Handbook 1939–1945. The History Press. ISBN 978-0-7509-9303-6.
