= RNAS Burscough =

Former Royal Naval Air Station in West Lancashire, England

RNAS Burscough HMS Ringtail
- Burscough, West Lancashire in England
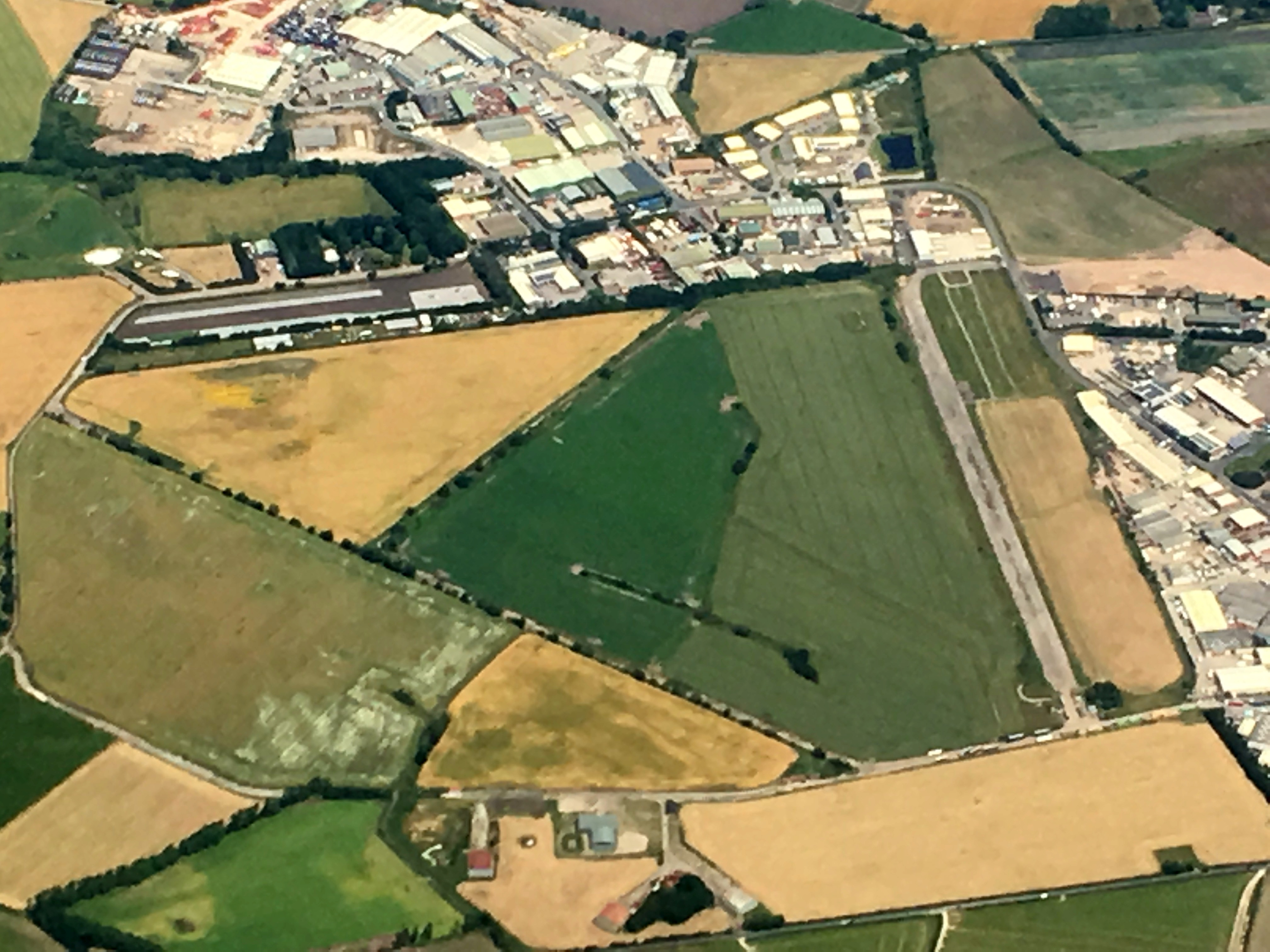
- RNAS Burscough

Site information
- Type: Royal Naval Air Station
- Owner: Admiralty
- Operator: Royal Navy
- Controlled by: Fleet Air Arm
- Condition: Disused

Location
- Shown within Lancashire RNAS Burscough (the United Kingdom)
- Coordinates: 53°35′33″N 002°52′01″W

Site history
- Built: 1943
- In use: 1943 - 1957
- Fate: Farmland / Industry
- Battles/wars: European theatre of World War II; Pacific War

Airfield information
Runways
| Direction | Length and surface |
|---|---|
| 04/22 | 900 metres (2,953 ft) Asphalt |
| 09/27 | 900 metres (2,953 ft) Asphalt |
| 13/31 | 1,000 metres (3,281 ft) Asphalt |
| 18/36 | 900 metres (2,953 ft) Asphalt |

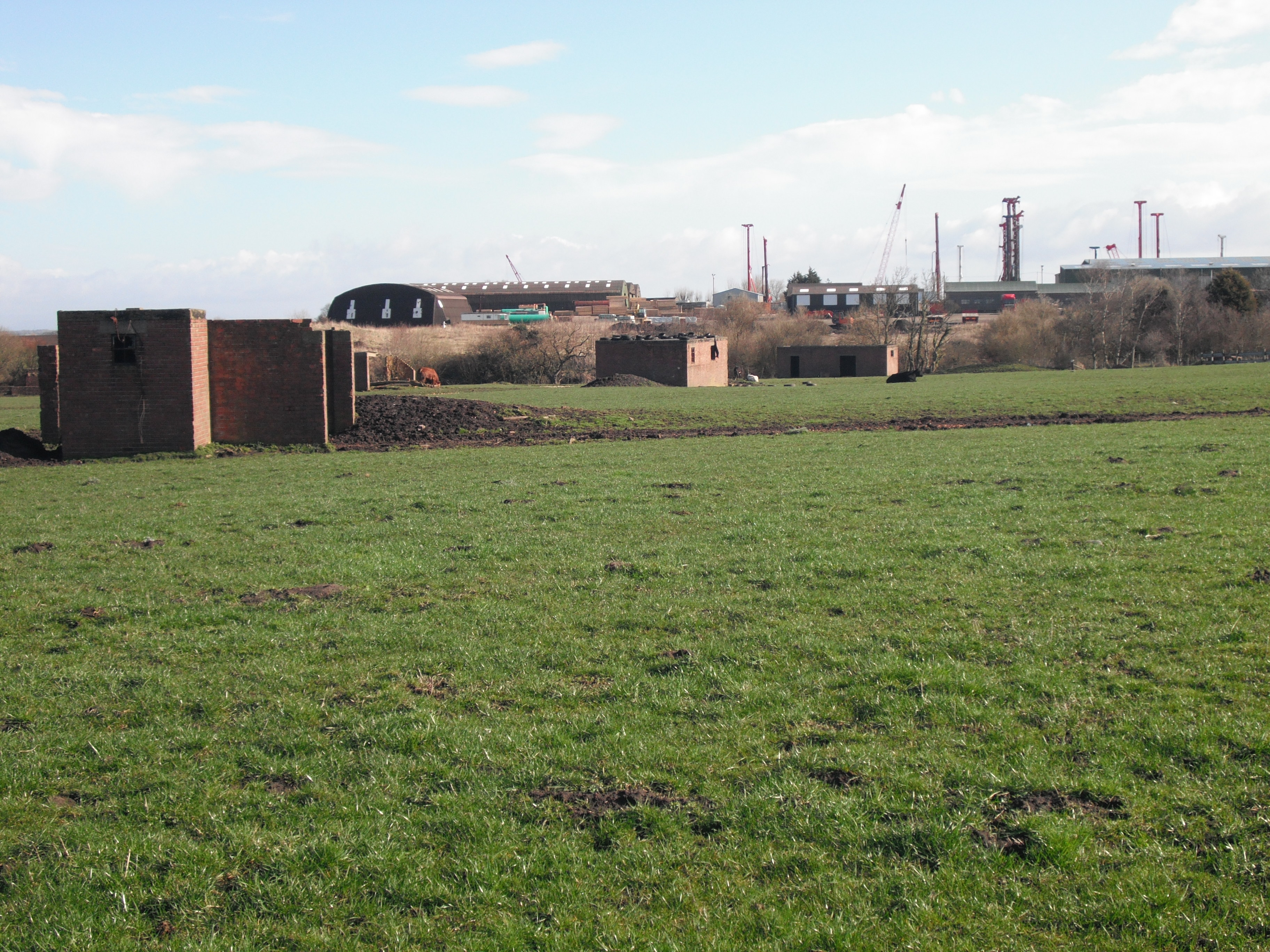
The station in 2010

Royal Naval Air Station Burscough, commonly known as RNAS Burscough, (commissioned HMS Ringtail), was a Fleet Air Arm (FAA) naval air station which was 1.5 miles (2.4 km) southwest of Burscough, Lancashire. The Admiralty acquired 650 acres (2.6 km^{2}) of land in December 1942 and the airfield was built with four narrow runways and several hangars, being commissioned on 1 September 1943.

It was used to train for landing aircraft on aircraft carriers. Specifically, according to Aldon P. Ferguson's book Lancashire Airfields in the Second World War: "it was constructed to the normal Navy plan with four runways instead of three, all of which were only 30 yards wide instead of the RAF standard 50 yards. The extra runway allowed the aircraft to land and take off as close as possible into the wind, with eight directions to choose from. The narrower landing strips also simulated take off and landing on aircraft carriers."

The name HMS Ringtail was as for a ship because it was a Naval airfield, rather than a Royal Air Force one, and it was named was for a bird. (Note: "Ring-tail" is an informal term used by birders for juveniles of several harrier species when seen in the field and not identifiable to an exact species.)

== Wartime operational history ==
The air station was planned to accommodate FAA day, night and torpedo fighter squadrons for their formation, training and working-up. Many FAA squadrons were based at Burscough for a period of a few weeks or months, before moving to front-line FAA bases or on to aircraft carriers for deployment in action in the European or Far Eastern war fronts.

One of the first FAA units to operate from HMS Ringtail was 809 Squadron FAA, equipped with Supermarine Seafires, it arrived from RAF Andover on 19 December 1943, then departed on 29 December when it flew its aircraft aboard the aircraft carrier HMS Stalker.

=== Units ===
The following units were here at some point:

- 3rd Naval Fighter Wing (October 1944 - February 1944)
- 4th Naval Fighter Wing (October 1943 - ?)
- 6th Naval Fighter Wing (February 1944)
- 707 Naval Air Squadron - Radar Trials Unit (February - August 1945)
- 735 Naval Air Squadron - ASV Training Unit (March 1944 - April 1946)
- 737 Naval Air Squadron - ASV Training Unit (April - November 1945)
- Detachments from 758 Naval Air Squadron - Naval Advanced Instrument Flying School (January 1944 - March 1944)
- 772 Naval Air Squadron - FRU School (January - May 1946)
- 776 Naval Air Squadron - FRU (October 1945)
- Detachment from 784 Naval Air Squadron - Night Fighter Training Squadron (August 1945)
- Y Flight of 787 Naval Air Squadron - Naval Air Fighting Development Unit (August - November 1944)
- Detachment from 798 Naval Air Squadron - Advanced Conversion Course (December 1945 - February 1946)
- 802 Naval Air Squadron - Single Seat Fighter Squadron (February 1946)
- 807 Naval Air Squadron - Single Seat Fighter Squadron (October 1943 - January 1944)
- 808 Naval Air Squadron - Single Seat Fighter Squadron (October 1943 - January 1944)
- 810 Naval Air Squadron - Torpedo Bomber Reconnaissance Squadron (December 1944 - February 1945)
- 812 Naval Air Squadron - Torpedo Bomber Reconnaissance Squadron (September - November 1944)
- 813 Naval Air Squadron - Torpedo Spotter Reconnaissance Squadron (February & November 1944)
- 822 Naval Air Squadron - Torpedo Bomber Reconnaissance Squadron (October - December 1945)
- 823 Naval Air Squadron - Torpedo Bomber Reconnaissance Squadron (January - February 1945)
- 824 Naval Air Squadron - Torpedo Bomber Reconnaissance Squadron (December 1945 - January 1946)
- 825 Naval Air Squadron - Torpedo Bomber Reconnaissance Squadron (November 1945 - February 1946)
- 829 Naval Air Squadron - Torpedo Bomber Reconnaissance Squadron (May 1944)
- 831 Naval Air Squadron - Torpedo Spotter Reconnaissance Squadron (May 1944)
- 835 Naval Air Squadron - Torpedo bomber Reconnaissance Squadron (July - August 1944)
- 846 Naval Air Squadron - Torpedo Bomber Reconnaissance Squadron (April 1944)
- 850 Naval Air Squadron - Torpedo Bomber Reconnaissance Squadron (November 1944)
- 879 Naval Air Squadron - Fleet Fighter Squadron (November 1943 - March 1944)
- 881 Naval Air Squadron - Fleet Fighter Squadron (May 1944)
- 886 Naval Air Squadron - Fleet Fighter Squadron (October 1943 - February 1944)
- 887 Naval Air Squadron - Fleet Fighter Squadron (January - February 1944)
- 888 Naval Air Squadron - Single Seat Fighter Squadron (June - September 1944)
- 894 Naval Air Squadron - Single Seat Fighter Squadron (January - February 1944)
- 896 Naval Air Squadron - Single Seat Fighter Squadron (May - June 1944)
- 897 Naval Air Squadron - Single Seat Fighter Squadron (October - December 1943)
- 1770 Naval Air Squadron - Two Seater Fighter Squadron (July 1944)
- 1771 Naval Air Squadron - Two Seater Fighter Squadron (March - June 1944)
- 1772 Naval Air Squadron - Two Seater Fighter Squadron (November 1944 - January 1945)
- 1790 Naval Air Squadron - Night Fighter Squadron (January - June 1945)
- 1791 Naval Air Squadron - Night Fighter Squadron (August - September 1945)
- 1820 Naval Air Squadron - Dive Bomber Squadron (August - October 1944)
- 1836 Naval Air Squadron - Single Seat Fighter Squadron (January - February 1944)
- 1837 Naval Air Squadron - Single Seat Fighter Squadron (February 1944)
- 1838 Naval Air Squadron - Single Seat Fighter Squadron (February 1944)
- 1840 Naval Air Squadron - Single Seat Fighter Squadron (March 1944)

== Post-war naval operations ==
RNAS Burscough closed for flying in May 1946. Thereafter, the hangars were used for the storage of aircraft engines and other FAA equipment, under the direction of RNAS Stretton (a.k.a. HMS Blackcap), until both airfields were disposed of in 1957.

== Civil aviation ==
In the 1960s, civil cropduster agricultural aircraft, both fixed wing and helicopters, used the now otherwise inactive airfield as an operating base for refuelling and filling the aircraft's spray tanks.

== Non-aviation use ==
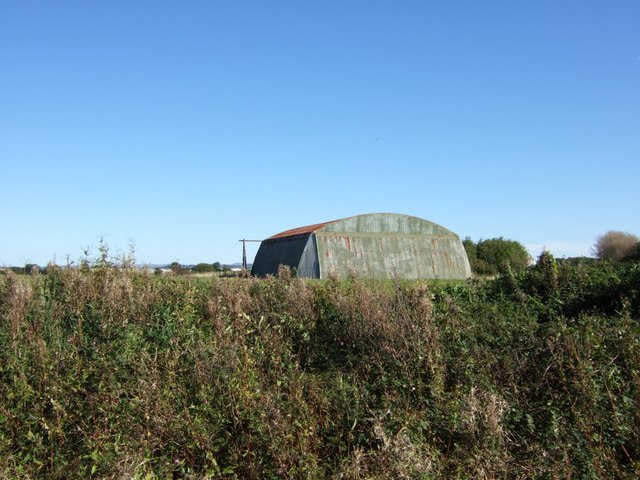
Old hangar at the airfield, 2008

As of early 2009, four naval hangars still survive in use for non-aviation purposes, and were used by the Merseyside Transport Trust, from the late 1970s until January 2012, when the charity moved to new premises within the industrial estate. The four hangars now stand empty and unused. These four hangars include 'Pentad' type hangars, and are on the western edge of the old airfield.

The site is now being developed with a large supermarket. Several historic photographs and maps of the wartime site are on display in its café.

== Bibliography ==
- Sturtivant, R; Ballance, T (1994). The Squadrons of The Fleet Air Arm. Tonbridge, Kent, UK: Air-Britain (Historians) Ltd. ISBN 0-85130-223-8.
- Sturtivant, Ray; Burrow, Mick (1995). Fleet Air Arm Aircraft 1939 to 1945. Tonbridge: Air-Britain (Historians) Ltd. ISBN 0-85130-232-7.
- Smith, David J (1981). Action Stations. Vol. 3 – Wales and the North West. Patrick Stephens Ltd. ISBN 0-85059-485-5.
