= Ray Rawbone =

Royal Navy rear admiral and Fleet Air Arm pilot (1923–2023)

Rear Admiral Alfred Raymond Rawbone CB AFC
- Born: 19 April 1923; Tenbury Wells, England
- Died: 12 March 2023 (aged 99)
- Military career
- Allegiance: United Kingdom
- Branch: Royal Navy
- Service years: 1942–1976
- Rank: Rear Admiral
- Nickname: Ray Rawbone
- Commands: HMS Kent (1972-73); RNAS Yeovilton (1970-72); HMS Dido (1968-69); HMS Loch Killisport (1959-60); 897 Naval Air Squadron (1955-57); 736 Naval Air Squadron (1953-54)
- Conflicts: Second World War; Suez Crisis
- Awards: Companion of the Order of the Bath; Air Force Cross; King's Commendation for Valuable Service in the Air

Rear Admiral Alfred Raymond Rawbone CB AFC (19 April 1923 – 12 March 2023) was a Royal Navy officer and Fleet Air Arm pilot who flew over forty aircraft types, including most variants of the Supermarine Seafire. During the Second World War, he flew the Seafire with 809 Naval Air Squadron, operating from the escort carrier HMS Stalker. His service included operations in the Mediterranean and the Far East. After the war, he continued his naval aviation career, commanded Fleet Air Arm squadrons and Royal Navy ships, and rose to the rank of rear admiral.

== Early life and training ==
Ray Rawbone was born in Tenbury Wells, Worcestershire, on 19 April 1923. He joined the Fleet Air Arm in 1941 and completed flying training at RAF Elmdon, Warwickshire, in the United Kingdom and RCAF Station Kingston, Kingston, Ontario, Canada. He converted to the Supermarine Seafire at RNAS Henstridge, Somerset, in mid-1943.

== Naval career ==
=== Second World War ===
Rawbone joined 809 Naval Air Squadron aboard the Attacker-class escort carrier HMS Stalker. The squadron operated in the Mediterranean and subsequently in the Far East. Rawbone completed one-hundred and seventeen operational landings aboard HMS Stalker without an accident.

He was part of Operation Dragoon and during operations in southern France in 1944, Rawbone was shot down while attacking ground targets. He evaded capture with assistance from the French Resistance and local civilians before returning to Allied forces and rejoining his squadron. He continued with 809 Squadron during 1945 and saw subsequent service in the Mediterranean and the Far East, including operations connected with Greece, Burma, Sumatra and Malaya.

=== Post-war career ===
After the war, Rawbone served as a flying instructor at the Royal Air Force's Central Flying School, at RAF Little Rissington, Gloucestershire. He received the King's Commendation for Valuable Service in the Air (KSVSA), announced in June 1950, and the Air Force Cross in the 1951 New Year Honours.

Rawbone subsequently flew the Supermarine Attacker, the Royal Navy's early first operational jet aircraft. He was appointed commanding officer of 736 Naval Air Squadron on 20 April 1953. On 7 November 1955, he took command of 897 Naval Air Squadron, flying Hawker Sea Hawks from the Audacious-class aircraft carrier HMS Eagle and saw operational service as part of Operation Musketeer during the Suez Crisis in 1956. He remained in command until the squadron disbanded on 5 January 1957.

In later an appointment, he commanded the Royal Navy's Loch-class frigate HMS Loch Killisport. Rawbone was promoted from commander to captain with effect from 31 December 1964.. He subsequently commanded the Leander-class frigate HMS Dido, before becoming commandant of Royal Naval Air Station Yeovilton, Somerset and this was followed by commanding the County-class destroyer HMS Kent.

He was promoted to rear admiral with seniority from 7 January 1974. His final posting was to the Supreme Headquarters Allied Powers Europe (SHAPE) in Belgium.

He was appointed a Companion of the Order of the Bath in the 1976 New Year Honours and placed on the retired list on 31 March 1976.

Rawbone died on 12 March 2023, aged 99.

== Personal life ==
During a brief leave period in 1943, Ray Rawbone married his teenage sweetheart, Iris Willshaw. As both were minors, they required their parents’ consent. Iris and their daughter survived him; their son had died before him.
