= 897 Naval Air Squadron =

Inactive flying squadron of the Royal Navy's Fleet Air Arm

- Squadron badge
- Active: 1942; 1942–1944; 1955–1957
- Disbanded: 5 January 1957
- Country: United Kingdom
- Branch: Royal Navy
- Type: Single-seat fighter squadron
- Role: Carrier-based fighter squadron
- Part of: Fleet Air Arm
- Home station: See Naval air stations section for full list.
- Mottos: Quam possumus optime (Latin for 'The very best we can')
- Aircraft: See Aircraft operated section for full list.
- Engagements: World War II: Operation Avalanche; Operation Neptune; Suez Crisis: Operation Musketeer
- Battle honours: Salerno 1943; Normandy 1944

Commanders
- Notable commanders: Captain Ronald Cuthbert Hay, DSC, RM; Rear Admiral Alfred Raymond Rawbone, CB, AFC, RN

Insignia
- Squadron Badge Description: Blue, a roseate tern [Sterna Dougalli] proper diving from dexter chief (1944)
- Identification Markings: 4A+ (Seafire by June 1944); 455–466 to 190–201 (Sea Hawk October 1956)
- Fin Carrier Codes: J:B to J (Sea Hawk October 1956)

897 Naval Air Squadron (897 NAS), sometimes expressed as 897 Squadron, was a Fleet Air Arm (FAA) naval air squadron of the United Kingdom’s Royal Navy (RN). It most recently operated Hawker Sea Hawk between November 1955 and January 1957.

Established as a fighter squadron with Supermarine Seafire, Supermarine Spitfire and Fairey Fulmar at HMS Blackcap, RNAS Stretton, on 1 August 1942, the squadron was disbanded into 801 and 880 Naval Air Squadrons on 3 September. It reformed at HMS Blackcap as a fighter unit with Hawker Sea Hurricane on 1 December 1942. On August 4, the squadron joined HMS Unicorn and provided air support for Operation Avalanche, part of the Allied invasion of Italy, in September 1943. The squadron became part of the 3rd Naval Fighter Wing, focusing on tactical reconnaissance and bombardment spotting and transitioning back to Seafire and Spitfire. It provided cover during the Operation Neptune, the Normandy landings, where it claimed a Messerschmidt Bf 109 and inflicted damage on a midget submarine. The squadron disbanded into 885 Naval Air Squadron on 15 July 1944.

It re-established at HMS Goldcrest, RNAS Brawdy, on 7 November 1955 as a fighter unit, deploying five months later aboard HMS Eagle to the Mediterranean. On 12 October 1956, the squadron participated in the Suez Crisis, completing well over one hundred sorties. It subsequently returned home and was disbanded on 5 January 1957.

== History ==
=== Single seat fighter squadron (1942–1944) ===
897 Naval Air Squadron was established at RNAS Stretton (HMS Blackcap), Cheshire, England, on 1 August 1942, as a single-seat fighter unit, initially equipped with three Supermarine Seafire F Mk IIc aircraft, a navalised version of the Supermarine Spitfire and three Fairey Fulmar Mk II carrier-borne fighter and reconnaissance aircraft. However, it was disbanded on 3 September, subsequently merging into 801 and 880 Naval Air Squadrons.

The squadron was re-established at RNAS Stretton on 1 December 1942, once more functioning as a single-seat fighter unit, initially equipped with six Hawker Sea Hurricane Mk IB fighter aircraft, a navalised version of the Hawker Hurricane. In March 1943, these were substituted with ten Supermarine Seafire F Mk Ib fighter aircraft, which were subsequently replaced in August by ten Mk IIc variants. With these aircraft, 897 Naval Air Squadron joined the aircraft repair ship and light aircraft carrier, HMS Unicorn, to offer air support for the Salerno landings the following month. During this operation, a section commanded by the squadron leader successfully executed one of the rare interceptions of enemy aircraft.

Upon relocating to RNAS Burscough (HMS Ringtail), Lancashire, England, in October 1943, the squadron integrated into the 3rd Naval Fighter Wing, focusing on tactical reconnaissance and bombardment spotting training. In March 1944, it transitioned to Supermarine Spitfire L.Mk Vb fighter aircraft, playing a crucial role in providing air support for the Normandy landings, during which it claimed the destruction of a Luftwaffe Messerschmitt Bf 109 fighter aircraft and inflicted damage on a midget submarine. This operation encompassed 374 sorties conducted between 6 June and 12 July and upon its completion, the squadron was officially disbanded on 15 July 1944, merging into 885 Naval Air Squadron while stationed at RNAS Lee-on-Solent (HMS Daedalus), Hampshire, England.

=== Hawker Sea Hawk (1955–1957) ===
897 Naval Air Squadron reestablished at RNAS Brawdy (HMS Goldcrest), Pembrokeshire, Wales, on 7 November 1955 as a fighter unit equipped with twelve Hawker Sea Hawk FB.3 jet fighter-bomber aircraft, the squadron deployed aboard the Audacious-class aircraft carrier, HMS Eagle to the Mediterranean five months later. On 12 October 1956, the unit's aircraft were swapped for the FGA.6 Fighter/Ground attack variant from 895 Naval Air Squadron, to participate in operations during the Suez Crisis, completing 169 sorties from 1 to 6 November, targeting shipping, military facilities, and airfields. Subsequently, the squadron returned to the United Kingdom and was disbanded on 5 January 1957.

== Aircraft operated ==
The squadron has operated a number of different aircraft types, including:

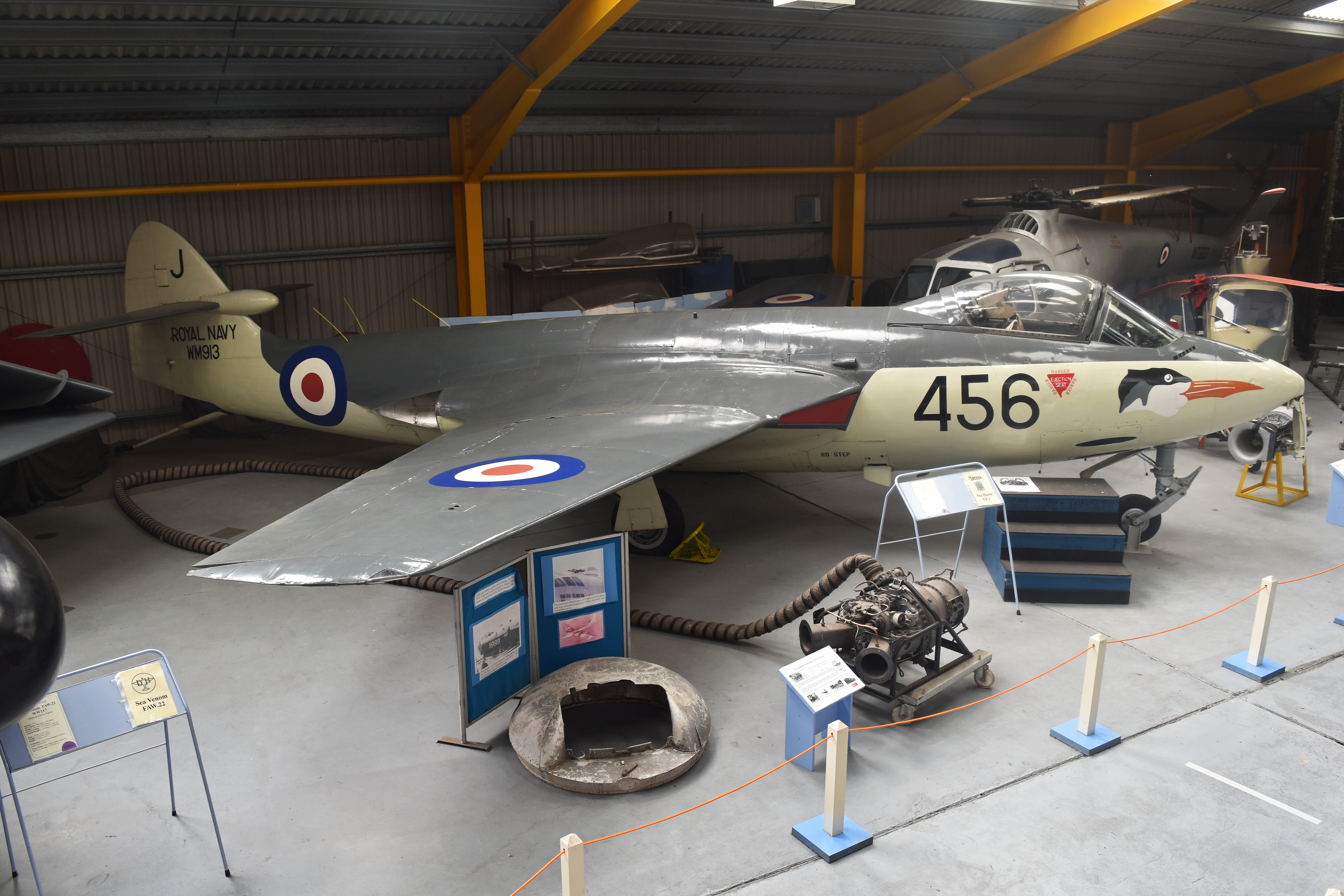
Hawker Sea Hawk FB.3 ‘WM913 J-456’ 897 NAS

- Fairey Fulmar Mk.I reconnaissance/fighter aircraft (August – September 1942)
- Fairey Fulmar Mk.II reconnaissance/fighter aircraft (August – September 1942)
- Supermarine Seafire Mk.Ib fighter aircraft (August – September 1942)
- Supermarine Seafire F Mk.IIc fighter aircraft (August – September 1942)
- Hawker Sea Hurricane Mk IB fighter aircraft (August – September 1942, December 1942 – March 1943)
- Supermarine Spitfire Mk Vb/hooked fighter aircraft (March – December 1943)
- Supermarine Seafire L Mk.IIc fighter aircraft (July 1943 – May 1944)
- Supermarine Spitfire L.Mk Vb fighter aircraft (May – July 1944)
- Hawker Sea Hawk FB 3 fighter-bomber aircraft (November 1955 – October 1956)
- Hawker Sea Hawk FGA 6 Fighter/Ground attack aircraft (October 1956 – January 1957)

== Battle honours ==
The battle honours awarded to 897 Naval Air Squadron are:

- Salerno 1943
- Normandy 1944

== Assignments ==
897 Naval Air Squadron was assigned as needed to form part of a number of larger units:

- 3rd Naval Fighter Wing (25 October 1943 - 17 July 1944)

== Naval air stations and aircraft carriers ==
897 Naval Air Squadron operated from a number of naval air stations of the Royal Navy in the UK and overseas, and also a number of Royal Navy fleet carriers and escort carriers and other airbases overseas:

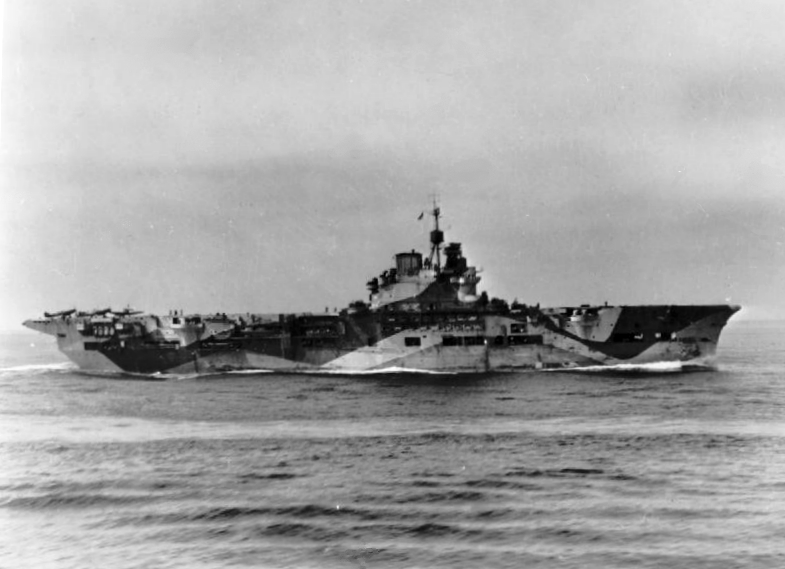
HMS Unicorn underway in 1943

1942

- Royal Naval Air Station Stretton (HMS Blackcap), Cheshire,(1 August – 3 September 1942)
- disbanded – (3 September 1942)

1942 – 1944

- Royal Naval Air Station Stretton (HMS Blackcap), Cheshire, (1 December 1942 – 10 January 1943)
- Royal Naval Air Station Charlton Horethorne (HMS Heron II), Somerset, (10 January – 23 March 1943)
- Royal Naval Air Station Lee-on-Solent (HMS Daedalus), Hampshire, (23 March – 5 May 1943)
- Royal Naval Air Station St Merryn (HMS Vulture), Cornwall, (5 May – 30 July 1943)
- Royal Naval Air Station Machrihanish (HMS Landrail), Argyll and Bute, (30 July – 10 August 1943)
  - HMS Unicorn (Deck Landing Training (DLT) 4 – 5 August 1943)
- HMS Unicorn (10 August – 10 October 1943)
  - RN Air Section Gibraltar, Gibraltar, (Detachment 17 – 20 August 1943)
  - Paestum Airfield, Italy, (Detachment two aircraft 12 – 14 September 1943)
- Royal Naval Air Station Burscough (HMS Ringtail), Lancashire, (10 October – 29 December 1943)
- HMS Stalker (29 December 1943 – 18 February 1944)
- Royal Naval Air Station Dale (HMS Goldcrest), Pembrokeshire, (18 – 24 February 1944)
- Royal Naval Air Station Lee-on-Solent (HMS Daedalus), Hampshire, (24 February – 11 March 1944)
- Royal Naval Air Station Henstridge (HMS Dipper), Somerset, (11 March – 11 April 1944)
- Royal Naval Air Station St Merryn (HMS Vulture), Cornwall, (11 – 22 April 1944)
- Royal Naval Air Station Henstridge (HMS Dipper), Somerset, (22 April – 6 May 1944)
- Royal Air Force Dundonald, South Ayrshire, (6 – 21 May 1944)
- Royal Naval Air Station Lee-on-Solent (HMS Daedalus), Hampshire, (21 May – 17 July 1944)
- disbanded – (17 July 1944)

1955 – 1957

- Royal Naval Air Station Brawdy (HMS Goldcrest), Pembrokeshire, (7 November 1955 – 30 January 1956)
- Royal Naval Air Station Ford (HMS Peregrine), Sussex, (transit) (30 – 31 January 1956)
  - HMS Bulwark (Deck Landing Training (DLT) 31 January 1956)
- Royal Naval Air Station Brawdy (HMS Goldcrest), Pembrokeshire, (9 February – 16 April 1956)

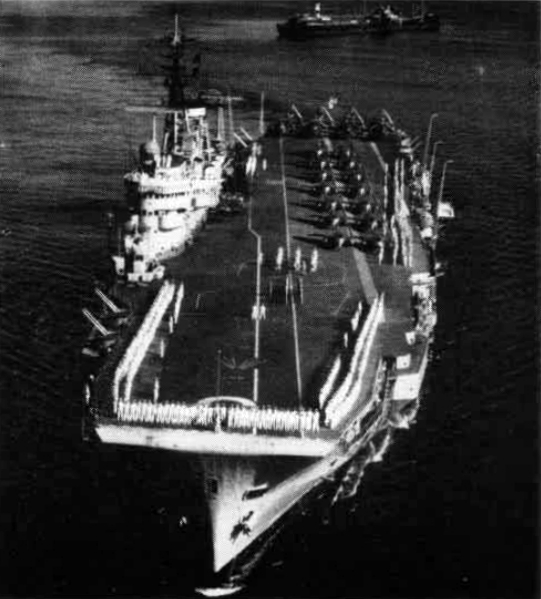
HMS Eagle (R05) in 1956

- HMS Eagle (16 April – 31 July 1956)
  - Royal Naval Air Station Hal Far (HMS Falcon), Malta, (Detachment six aircraft 7 – 22 May / 29 June – 17 July 1956)
- Royal Naval Air Station Hal Far (HMS Falcon), Malta, (31 July – 14 August 1956)
- HMS Eagle (14 August – 14 September 1956)
  - Royal Naval Air Station Hal Far (HMS Falcon), Malta, (Detachment seven aircraft 23 August – 4 September 1956)
- Royal Naval Air Station Hal Far (HMS Falcon), Malta, (14 – 29 September 1956
- HMS Eagle (25 September 1956 – 1 January 1957)
- RN Air Section Gibraltar, Gibraltar, (Detachment three aircraft 13 – 20 October 1956)
- Royal Naval Air Station Hal Far (HMS Falcon), Malta, (Detachment four aircraft 30 November – 11 December 1956)
- Royal Naval Air Station Lee-on-Solent (HMS Daedalus), Hampshire, (1 – 5 January 1957)
- disbanded – (5 January 1957)

== Commanding officers ==
List of commanding officers of 897 Naval Air Squadron with date of appointment:

1942

- Captain R.C. Hay, DSC, RM, from 1 August 1942
- disbanded – 3 September 1942

1942 – 1944

- Lieutenant(A) W.C. Simpson, RN, from 1 December 1942 (Lieutenant Commander, DSC, 10 March 1943)
- disbanded – 17 July 1944

1955 – 1957

- Lieutenant Commander A.R. Rawbone, AFC, RN, from 7 November 1955
- disbanded – 5 January 1957

Note: Abbreviation (A) signifies Air Branch of the RN or RNVR.
