= RAF Dundonald =

Former RAF station in South Ayrshire, Scotland

RAF Dundonald
- Dundonald, South Ayrshire, Scotland

Site information
- Type: Royal Air Force station
- Owner: Air Ministry
- Operator: Royal Air Force
- Controlled by: RAF Fighter Command

Location
- Location in South Ayrshire RAF Dundonald (the United Kingdom)
- Coordinates: 55.589°N 4.604°W

Site history
- Built: 1940
- In use: 1940-1945
- Battles/wars: European theatre of World War II

Royal Air Force Dundonald or more simply RAF Dundonald is a former Royal Air Force station located in South Ayrshire, Scotland, three miles north-east from the coastal town of Troon.

During its brief existence during the Second World War the airfield was used for training purposes, most notably by 516 Squadron providing air support for commando and assault troop training.

== History ==
The airfield opened in March 1940 as a relief landing ground (RLG) for nearby RAF Prestwick. At that time Prestwick was occupied by No. 12 Elementary Flying Training School (12 EFTS) and the RLG was mainly used by novice pilots practising circuits and bumps in de Havilland Tiger Moth trainers. For this purpose only the most basic airfield facilities were required, and RAF Dundonald had two short grass runways which were later reinforced with Sommerfeld Tracking.

Author John Harris has suggested there is evidence RAF Dundonald may have been the intended destination of Rudolf Hess who had to bail out on his flight to Britain on 10 May 1941. Harris also suggests high-ranking officials may have been waiting there for Hess, so as to negotiate as part of a plot involving the king proroguing parliament and threatening to remove Churchill from power. This was constitutionally possible. Conversely it that may simply have been an MI6 ruse to lure him out of Hitler's orbit to make way for Martin Bormann.

After 12 EFTS was disbanded in March 1941 Dundonald saw little use until April 1943 when 516 (Combined Operations) Squadron formed at the airfield. The squadron operated a mixed collection of aircraft, mainly North American Mustang and Hawker Hurricane fighter-bombers as well as some Bristol Blenheim, Westland Lysander, Avro Anson and Percival Proctor aircraft. The role of the squadron was to support commando and assault training exercises by providing realistic simulation air attacks and numerous other army support functions. Detachments from a number of other RAF and Fleet Air Arm squadrons also operated from Dundonald for brief periods in support of combined operations training exercises.

Following the success of the Normandy landings the need for combined operations training diminished, and 516 Squadron was disbanded in December 1944. Thereafter RAF Dundonald was placed on care and maintenance and saw only occasional use until the end of the war. The airfield closed in August 1945 but the site was retained for use by the army until 1952.

== Units ==
- No. 2 Squadron RAF
- Relief Landing Ground for No. 12 Elementary Flying Training School RAF (March 1940 -)
- No. 18 Squadron RAF
- No. 26 Squadron RAF
- No. 63 Squadron RAF
- No. 268 Squadron RAF
- No. 414 Squadron RCAF
- 808 Naval Air Squadron
- 879 Naval Air Squadron
- 885 Naval Air Squadron
- 886 Naval Air Squadron
- 897 Naval Air Squadron
- No. 1441 (Combined Operations Development) Flight RAF (October 1942 – April 1943) became No. 516 Squadron RAF

== Subsequent use ==
A Monsanto Nylon plant was built on part of the former airfield in the 1960s, but it closed in 1979 and was redeveloped as an industrial estate named Olympic Business Park. The balance of the site reverted to farmland. None of the temporary wartime buildings survive and there is now little evidence of the former airfield, however the outlines of parts of the runways can still be discerned on satellite images.
