= 886 Naval Air Squadron =

Inactive flying squadron of the Royal Navy's Fleet Air Arm

- Squadron badge
- Active: 1942–1944
- Disbanded: 19 July 1944
- Country: United Kingdom
- Branch: Royal Navy
- Type: Single-seat fighter squadron
- Role: Fleet fighter squadron
- Part of: Fleet Air Arm
- Home station: See Naval air stations section for full list.
- Mottos: Vires acquiret eundo (Latin for 'It gains strength as it goes')
- Engagements: World War II: Operation Avalanche; Operation Neptune
- Battle honours: Salerno 1943; Normandy 1944

Insignia
- Squadron Badge Description: White, a Chinese dragon torqued green breathing flames proper (1943)
- Identification Markings: uncoded (Fulmar); 3A+ (Spitfire) single letters (Swordfish) single letters, then 2A+ (Seafire)

Aircraft flown
- Bomber: Fairey Swordfish
- Fighter: Fairey Fulmar; Supermarine Seafire; Hawker Hurricane; Supermarine Spitfire

886 Naval Air Squadron (886 NAS), also referred to as 886 Squadron, was a Fleet Air Arm (FAA) naval air squadron of the United Kingdom’s Royal Navy (RN). It was formed at HMS Merlin, RNAS Donibristle, as a Fleet Fighter squadron during March 1942. Active only during the Second World War, it flew Fairey Swordfish, Fairey Fulmar, Supermarine Seafire, Hawker Hurricane and Supermarine Spitfire.

The squadron was loaned to RAF Fighter Command during the summer of 1942, returning the Fleet Air Arm later on in the year. 1943 saw it participate in Operation Avalanche, part of the Allied invasion of Italy. The following year it was involved with operations over Normandy, spotting for the allied invasion of France from 6 to the end of June 1944, disbanding the following month.

== History ==
=== Fleet fighter squadron (1942–1944) ===
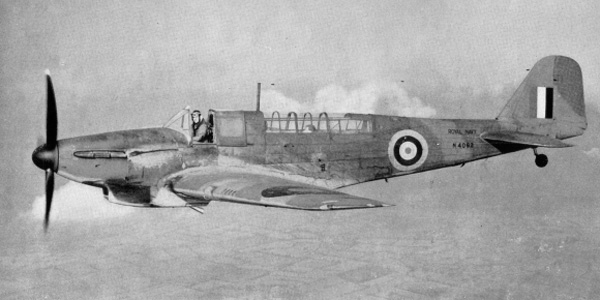
Fairey Fulmar Mk.II

886 Naval Air Squadron formed at RNAS Donibristle (HMS Merlin), Fife, Scotland, on 15 March 1942, Lieutenant J. Harman commanding. Its role was as a Fleet Fighter squadron and it was equipped with six Fairey Fulmar Mk II, a carrier-based reconnaissance and fighter aircraft.

The squadron personnel underwent type familiarisation and after working-up it flew south on 23 May to RNAS St Merryn (HMS Vulture), Cornwall. One month afterwards it moved east to RNAS Yeovilton (HMS Heron), Somerset, on 22 June. A third shorter move, on 10 July, saw the squadron based at RNAS Charlton Horethorne (HMS Heron II), Somerset, for more training, and being one of the first FAA units to use the newly acquired airbase.

The squadron had a supernumerary role. Lieutenant Commander(A) R. Oliphant, was appointed as CO from 27 July and the squadron was loaned to Fighter Command on 11 August, initially operating with No. 13 Group RAF at RAF Turnhouse, in Edinburgh, Scotland, and a couple of days later moved to RAF Peterhead, Aberdeenshire under No. 14 Group RAF.

886 Naval Air Squadron returned to the Fleet Air Arm at RNAS Stretton (HMS Blackcap), Cheshire, on 7 October. The following nine months saw the squadron at various airbases in Scotland and Northern Ireland and in March 1943, it swapped the Fairey Fulmar for nine Supermarine Seafire L Mk.IIc fighter aircraft, the navalised development of the Supermarine Spitfire.

In June 1943 the squadron created a ‘B’ Flight when it acquired six Fairey Swordfish biplane torpedo bomber aircraft out of 837 Naval Air Squadron which had disbanded.

886 Naval Air Squadron embarked in the name ship of her class HMS Attacker on 19 June. Upon arrival in the Mediterranean the squadron provided fighter cover during Operation Avalanche, the Solerno landings. The Fairey Swordfish of ‘B’ Flight provided anti-submarine patrols from the United States Army Air Forces' Paestum Airfield, in the province of Salerno, and RN Air Section Gibraltar, at RAF North Front.

On returning to the United Kingdom, at RNAS Burscough (HMS Ringtail), Lancashire, on 7 October, the Fairey Swordfish 'B' Flight was disbanded, the squadron joined the 3rd Naval Fighter Wing and Lieutenant Commander P. Bailey was appointed commanding officer on 28. Training in spotting and reconnaissance at RNAS Lee-on-Solent (HMS Daedalus), Hampshire, was undertaken from February 1944 and the squadron used Supermarine Spitfire fighter aircraft until these could be replaced by ten Supermarine Seafire L Mk.III, in March.

From D-Day, 886 Naval Air Squadron formed part of and operated as part of the Air Spotting Pool of No. 34 Reconnaissance Wing, of the RAF Second Tactical Air Force. Its duties included anti-submarine patrols, bomber escort, aerial spotting for Naval gunfire support and offensive fighter sweeps. It disbanded, being absorbed into 885 Naval Air Squadron on 19 July 1944.

== Aircraft flown ==
The squadron has operated a number of different aircraft types, including:

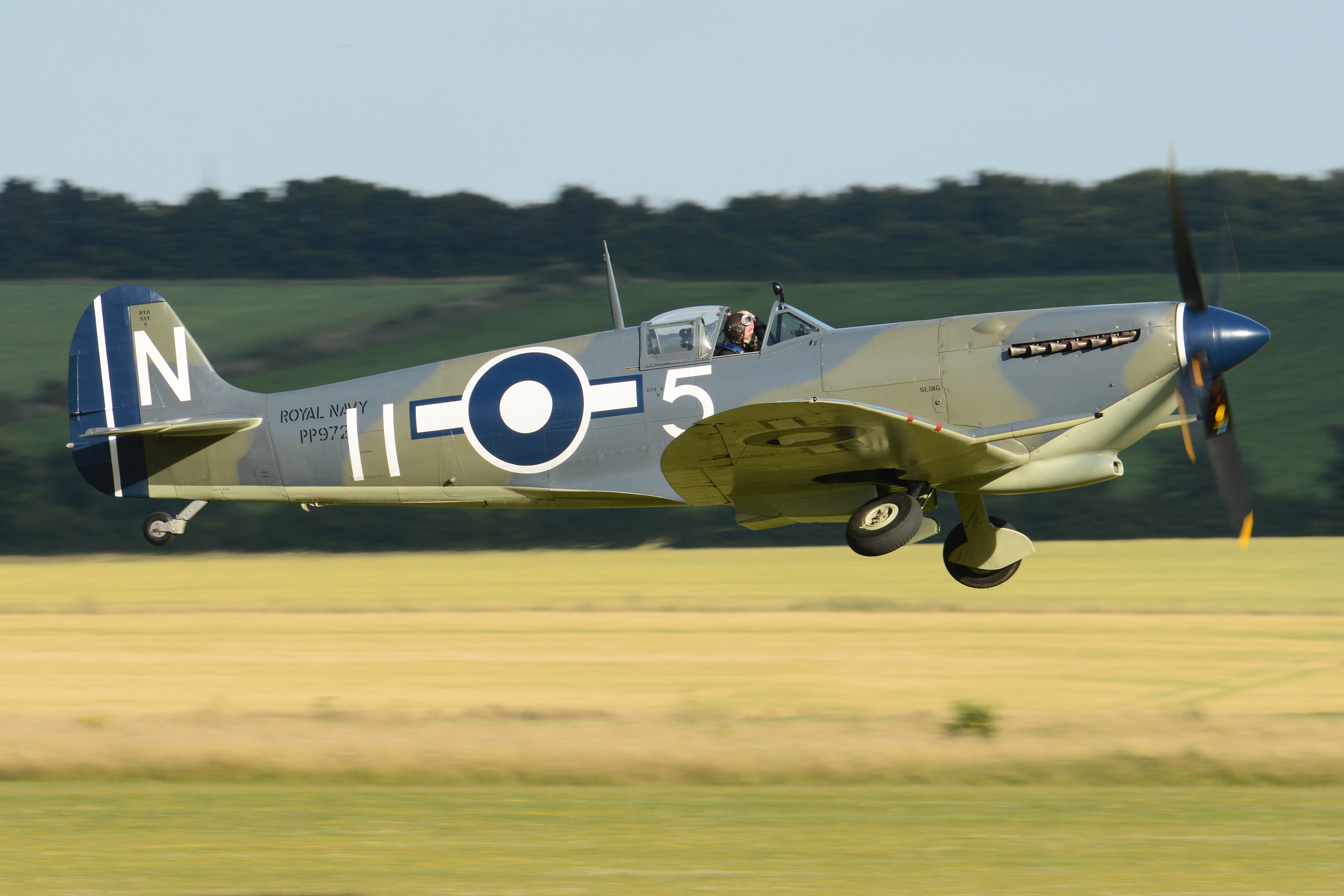
Supermarine Seafire L Mk.III

- Fairey Fulmar Mk.II reconnaissance/fighter aircraft (March 1942 - March 1943)
- Hawker Hurricane Mk.I fighter aircraft (March 1942)
- Supermarine Spitfire Mk Vb/hooked fighter aircraft (February - March 1943, February - March 1944)
- Fairey Swordfish II torpedo bomber (June - October 1943)
- Supermarine Seafire L Mk.IIc fighter aircraft (March 1943 - February 1944)
- Supermarine Seafire L Mk.III fighter aircraft (March - July 1944)

== Battle honours ==
The battle honours awarded to 886 Naval Air Squadron are:

- Salerno 1943
- Normandy 1944

== Assignments ==
886 Naval Air Squadron was assigned as needed to form part of a number of larger units:

- 3rd Naval Fighter Wing (October 1943 - July 1944)

== Naval air stations and aircraft carriers ==
886 Naval Air Squadron operated from a number of naval air stations of the Royal Navy, and Royal Air Force stations in the UK and overseas, and also a number of Royal Navy escort carriers and other airbases overseas:

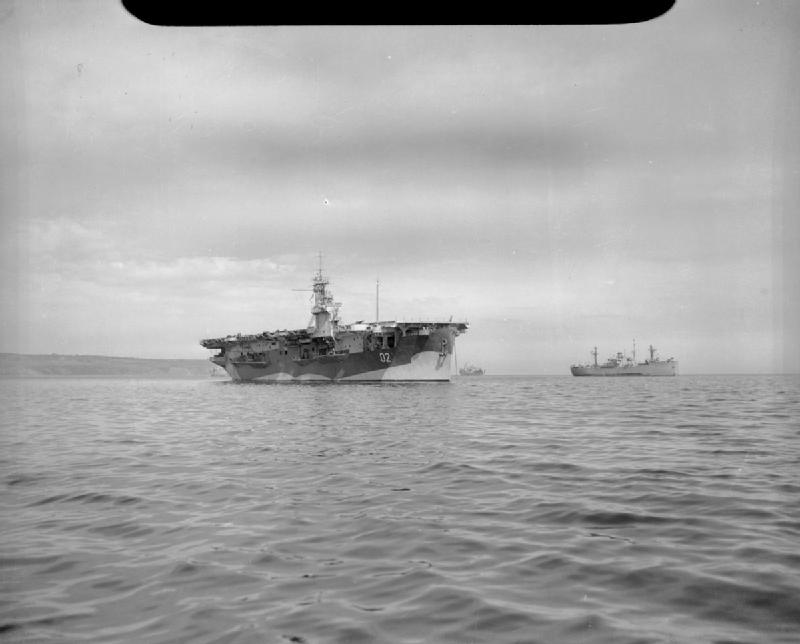
HMS Attacker at anchor

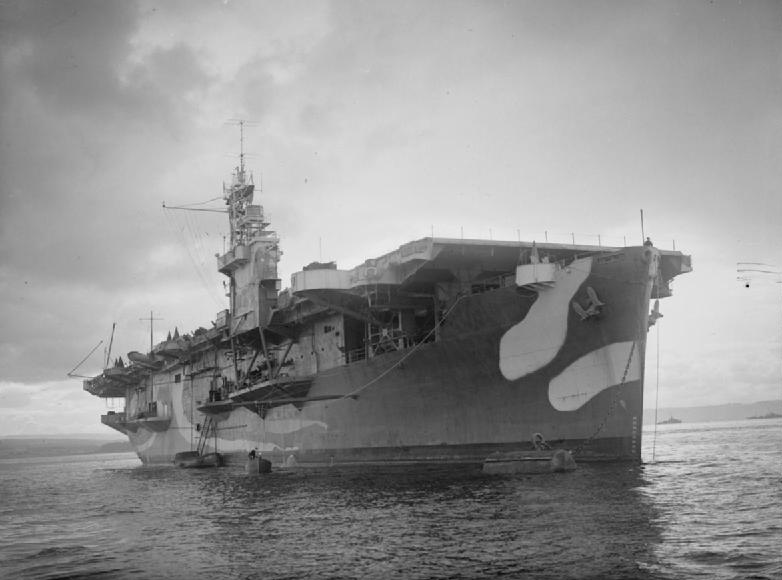
HMS Ravager, used by 886 Squadron for Deck Landing Training

- Royal Naval Air Station Donibristle (HMS Merlin) (15 March - 23 May 1942)
- Royal Naval Air Station St Merryn (HMS Vulture) (23 May - 22 June 1942)
- Royal Naval Air Station Yeovilton (HMS Heron) (22 June - 10 July 1942)
- Royal Naval Air Station Charlton Horethorne (HMS Heron II) (10 July - 11 August 1942)
- Royal Air Force Turnhouse (13 Gp) (11 - 13 August 1942)
- Royal Air Force Peterhead (14 Gp) (13 August - 7 October 1942)
- Royal Naval Air Station Stretton (HMS Blackcap) (7 - 24 October 1942)
- Royal Naval Air Station Machrihanish (HMS Landrail) (24 October - 5 December 1942)
- Royal Naval Air Station Belfast (5 December 1942 - 1 January 1943)
- Royal Air Force Ternhouse (1 January - 15 June 1943)
- Royal Naval Air Station Machrihanish (HMS Landrail) (15 - 19 June 1943)
- HMS Attacker (19 - 21 June 1943)
- Royal Naval Air Station Machrihanish (HMS Landrail) (21 June - 12 July 1943)
- HMS Attacker (12 July - 9 August 1943)
- RN Air Section Gibraltar (9 - 31 August 1943)
- HMS Attacker (31 August - 6 October 1943)
  - RN Air Section Gibraltar ('B Flight) (31 August - 1 October 1943)
  - Paestum Airfield (Detachment two aircraft 12 - 16 September 1943)
- Royal Naval Air Station Machrihanish (HMS Landrail) (6 - 7 October 1943)
- Royal Naval Air Station Burscough (HMS Ringtail) (7 October - 29 December 1943)
  - HMS Ravager DLT (4 - 8 December 1943)
- HMS Attacker (29 December 1943 - 6 February 1944)
- Royal Air Force Andreas (transit) (6 - 7 February 1944)
- Royal Naval Air Station Burscough (HMS Ringtail) (7 - 25 February 1944)
- Royal Naval Air Station Lee-on-Solent (HMS Daedalus) (25 February - 11 March 1944)
- Royal Naval Air Station Henstridge (HMS Dipper) (11 March - 25 April 1944)
- Royal Naval Air Station St Merryn (HMS Vulture) (25 April - 4 May 1944)
- Royal Naval Air Station Henstridge (HMS Dipper) (4 - 6 May 1944)
- Royal Naval Air Station Ауг (HMS Wagtail) (6 - 13 May 1944)
- Royal Air Force Dundonald (13 - 20 May 1944)
- Royal Naval Air Station Lee-on-Solent (HMS Daedalus) (20 May - 19 July 1944)
- disbanded - (19 July 1944)

== Commanding officers ==
List of commanding officers of 886 Naval Air Squadron:

- Lieutenant J.C.M. Harman, RN, from 15 March 1942
- Lieutenant Commander(A) R.H.H.L. Oliphant, RN, from 27 July 1942
- Lieutenant Commander P.E.I. Bailey, RN, 28 October 1943
- disbanded - 19 July 1944

Note: Abbreviation (A) signifies Air Branch of the RN or RNVR.
