= 885 Naval Air Squadron =

Inactive flying squadron of the Royal Navy's Fleet Air Arm

- Squadron badge
- Active: 1941; 1941–1943; 1944–1945
- Disbanded: 27 September 1945
- Country: United Kingdom
- Branch: Royal Navy
- Type: Single-seat fighter squadron
- Role: Fleet fighter squadron
- Part of: Fleet Air Arm
- Home station: See Naval air stations section for full list.
- Mottos: Celerrime (Latin for 'Very quickly')
- Aircraft: See Aircraft operated section for full list.
- Engagements: World War II: Operation Pedestal; Operation Torch; Operation Husky; Operation Neptune; Operation Iceberg
- Battle honours: Malta Convoys 1942; North Africa 1942; Sicily 1942; Normandy 1944; Okinawa 1945

Insignia
- Squadron Badge Description: Blue, issuant from water barry engrailed of four white and blue flames proper therein a cat emergent affronty black (1945)
- Identification Markings: single letters (Sea Hurricane); 7A+ (Sea Hurricane on HMS Victorious); 3A+ (Spitfire June 1944); 06A+ (Seafire on HMS Formidable); 2A+ (Seafire June 1944) single letters (Hellcat); K8A+ (Hellcat) single letters (Corsair); 100+ (Corsair)

885 Naval Air Squadron (885 NAS) was a Naval Air Squadron of the Royal Navy's Fleet Air Arm. First formed on 1 March 1941, the squadron served as a fighter squadron during the Second World War. It operated in the Mediterranean in 1942–43, where it took part in Operation Torch, the Anglo-American invasion of French North Africa, the Allied invasion of Sicily and the Allied invasion of Italy. In 1944 it took part in the Allied invasion of Normandy, spotting for Allied artillery bombardments and in 1945, was deployed as part of the British Pacific Fleet. It was disbanded for the last time on 27 September 1945.

== Service ==
885 Naval Air Squadron was first formed on 1 March 1941 at RNAS Dhekeila (HMS Grebe) in Egypt, the pre-war Alexandria airport, as a carrier fighter squadron, equipped with a mix of Brewster Buffalo, an American fighter aircraft and Gloster Gladiator, a British biplane fighter. The squadron briefly served aboard the carrier Eagle later that month, but was disbanded on 1 May 1941.

The squadron was reformed at RNAS Yeovilton (HMS Heron), Somerset, equipped with Hawker Sea Hurricane fighters, a navalised version of the Hawker Hurricane, on 1 December 1941. In June 1942, 885 NAS embarked on the carrier Victorious, strengthening the carrier's air wing before Victorious formed part of the distant escort for the disastrous arctic convoy PQ 17 and the return convoy QP 13.

The squadron re-embarked its six Hawker Sea Hurricanes aboard Victorious on 31 July 1942 before the carrier set out to take part in the Malta Convoy, Operation Pedestal. In September 1942, the squadron was ordered to RNAS Machrihanish (HMS Landrail), Argyll and Bute, to re-equip with the Supermarine Seafire F Mk.IIc, a navalised Supermarine Spitfire, and then embarked on Formidable for Operation Torch, the Anglo-American invasion of French North Africa in November that year. The Squadron remained on Formidable as the carrier covered the Allied invasion of Sicily in July 1943 and Operation Avalanche, the Allied landings near Salerno, Italy in September 1943. The squadron returned to Britain in October 1943 and was disbanded on 15 November 1943.

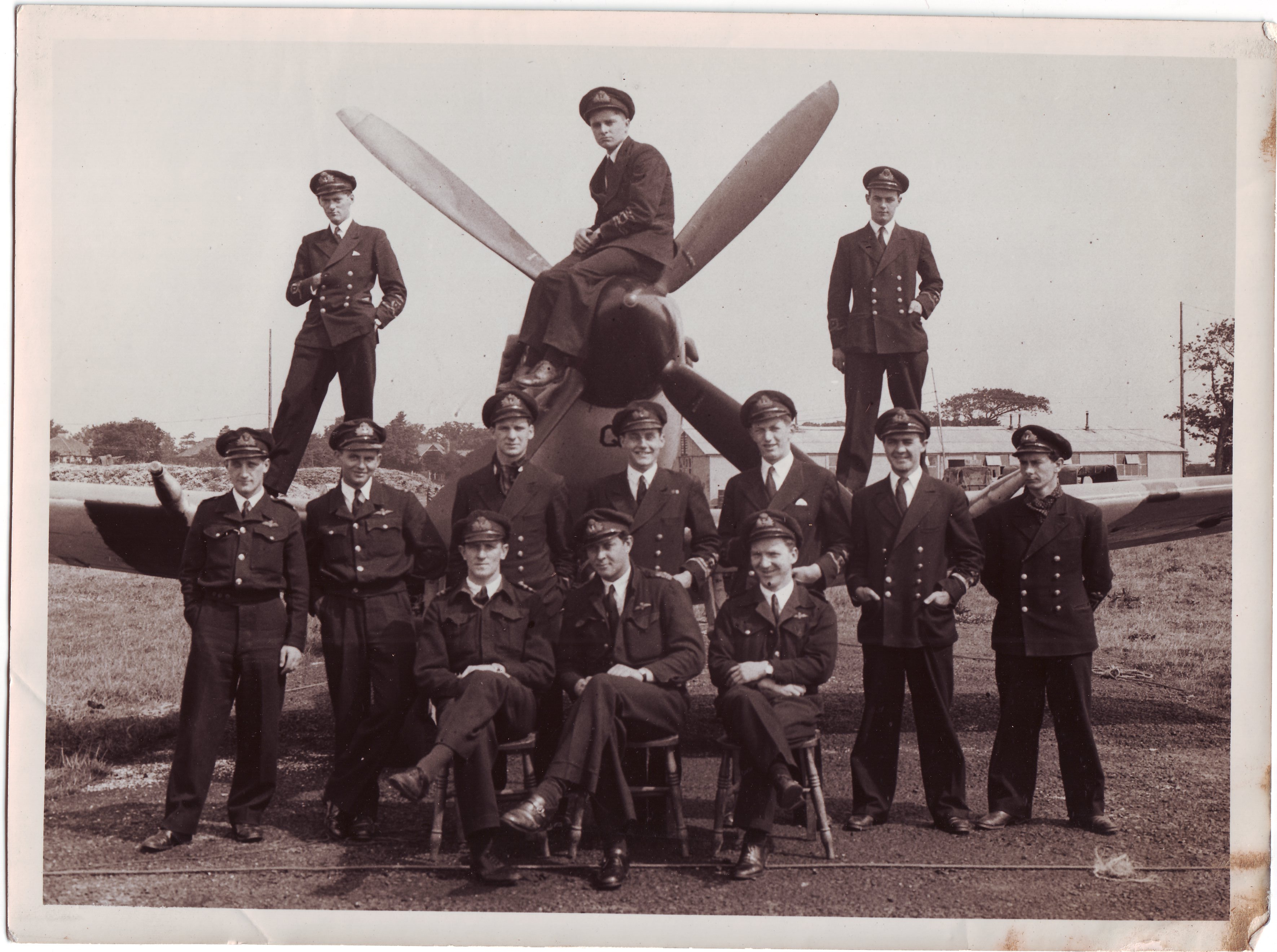
Taken after D-day in mid-1944. The black and white invasion stripes on the Seafire F Mk.III are still visible. Commander 'Tiny' Devonald, DFC, is sitting front centre. 13 pilots of the original 14 in 885 Squadron are in the photo following the loss of Lt. Anthony Bassett on 6 June 1944.

The squadron reformed again at RNAS Lee-on-Solent (HMS Daedalus), Hampshire, on 15 February 1944, again equipped with Supermarine Seafire. Following the Allied invasion of Normandy on 6 June 1944, the squadron was employed as part of RAF Second Tactical Air Force's air spotting pool, spotting for Allied artillery bombardments as well as escorting shipping in the Channel and carrying out fighter sweeps. In July, 886 and 897 Naval Air Squadrons, both also Seafire-equipped, were merged with 885 Naval Air Squadron. In November 1944, the squadron re-equipped with Grumman Hellcat, an American carrier-based fighter aircraft, in preparation for a transfer to the British Pacific Fleet.

The squadron embarked on the escort carrier Ruler in December 1944, with Ruler meeting up with the British Pacific fleet in April 1945. Ruler was tasked with providing fighter and anti submarine protection for the Fleet Train replenishment ships supporting the fleet, with 885 Naval Air Squadron supplementing its eighteen Grumman Hellcats with four Grumman Avenger torpedo bombers for anti-submarine duties. On 14–15 May, the squadron provided air cover while the British Pacific Fleet replenished during the Battle of Okinawa, with the squadron's aircraft also being used as targets to train the fleet's fighter controllers and anti-aircraft gunners.

After the end of Okinawa operations, the squadron disembarked at RNAS Ponum (HMS Nabaron), Ponam Island off New Guinea, providing continuation flying for replacement pilots for the fleet, and temporarily adding some Vought Corsair, an American fighter aircraft, while ashore to improve the training it could offer. From June, 885 Naval Air Squadron operated from Ruler to cover more refuelling operations during operations against Japan. The squadron was disbanded at RAAF Station Schofields, near Sydney Australia on 27 September 1945.

== Aircraft operated ==
The squadron has operated a number of different aircraft types, including:

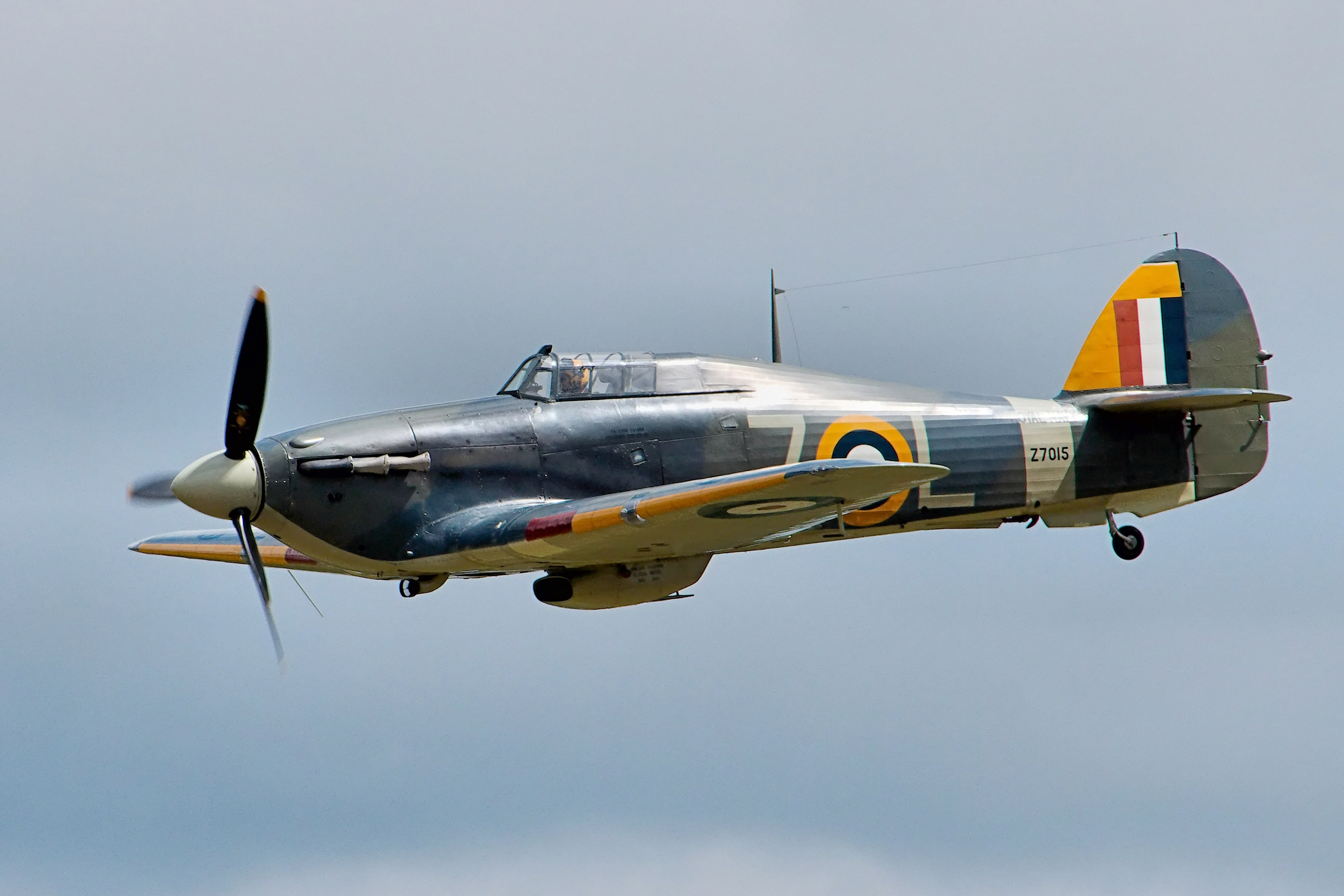
Hawker Sea Hurricane Mk IB

- Gloster Sea Gladiator biplane fighter aircraft (March - May 1941)
- Brewster Buffalo fighter aircraft (March - May 1941)
- Hawker Sea Hurricane Mk IB fighter aircraft (December 1941 - August 1942)
- Supermarine Spitfire Mk Va fighter aircraft (September - October 1942)
- Supermarine Spitfire Mk Vb/hooked fighter aircraft (September - October 1942)
- Supermarine Seafire Mk.IIc fighter aircraft (September 1942 - November 1943)
- Supermarine Seafire Mk.Ib fighter aircraft (October 1942 - August 1943)
- Supermarine Seafire L MK.III fighter aircraft (February - November 1944)
- Supermarine Seafire F MK.III fighter aircraft (February - November 1944)
- Supermarine Seafire L MK.IIc fighter aircraft (August - November 1944)
- Grumman Hellcat F. Mk. I fighter aircraft (October 1944 - May 1945)
- Grumman Hellcat F. Mk. II fighter aircraft (October 1944 - September 1945)
- Grumman Tarpon GR.I torpedo bomber (May - September 1945)
- Grumman Avenger Mk.II torpedo bomber (May - September 1945)
- Vought Corsair Mk II fighter-bomber (June - August 1945)
- Vought Corsair Mk IV fighter-bomber (June - August 1945)

== Battle honours ==
The battle honours awarded to 885 Naval Air Squadron are:

- Malta Convoys 1942
- North Africa 1942
- Sicily 1943
- Normandy 1944
- Okinawa 1945

== Naval air stations and aircraft carriers ==
885 Naval Air Squadron operated from a number of naval air stations of the Royal Navy, and Royal Air Force stations in the UK and overseas, and also a number of Royal Navy fleet carriers and escort carriers and other airbases overseas:

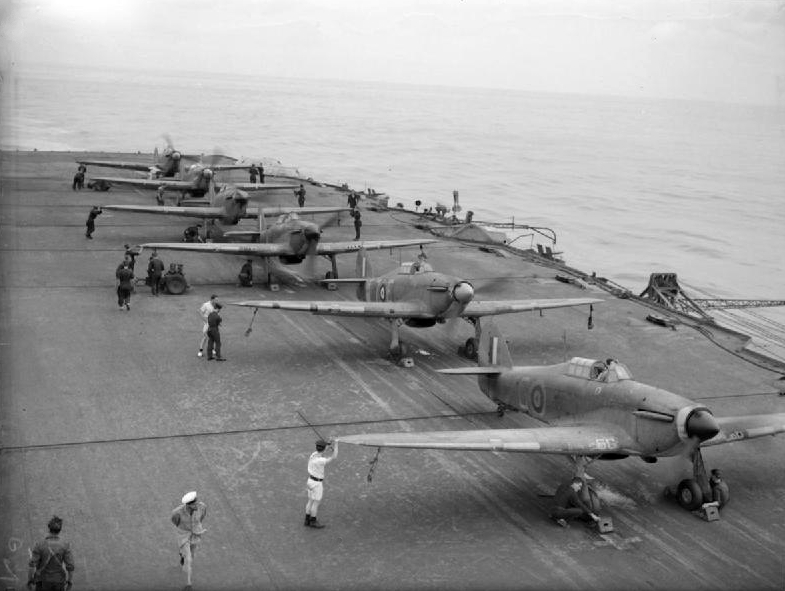
Hawker Sea Hurricanes of 885 Naval Air Squadron on the deck of HMS Victorious during Operation Pedestal

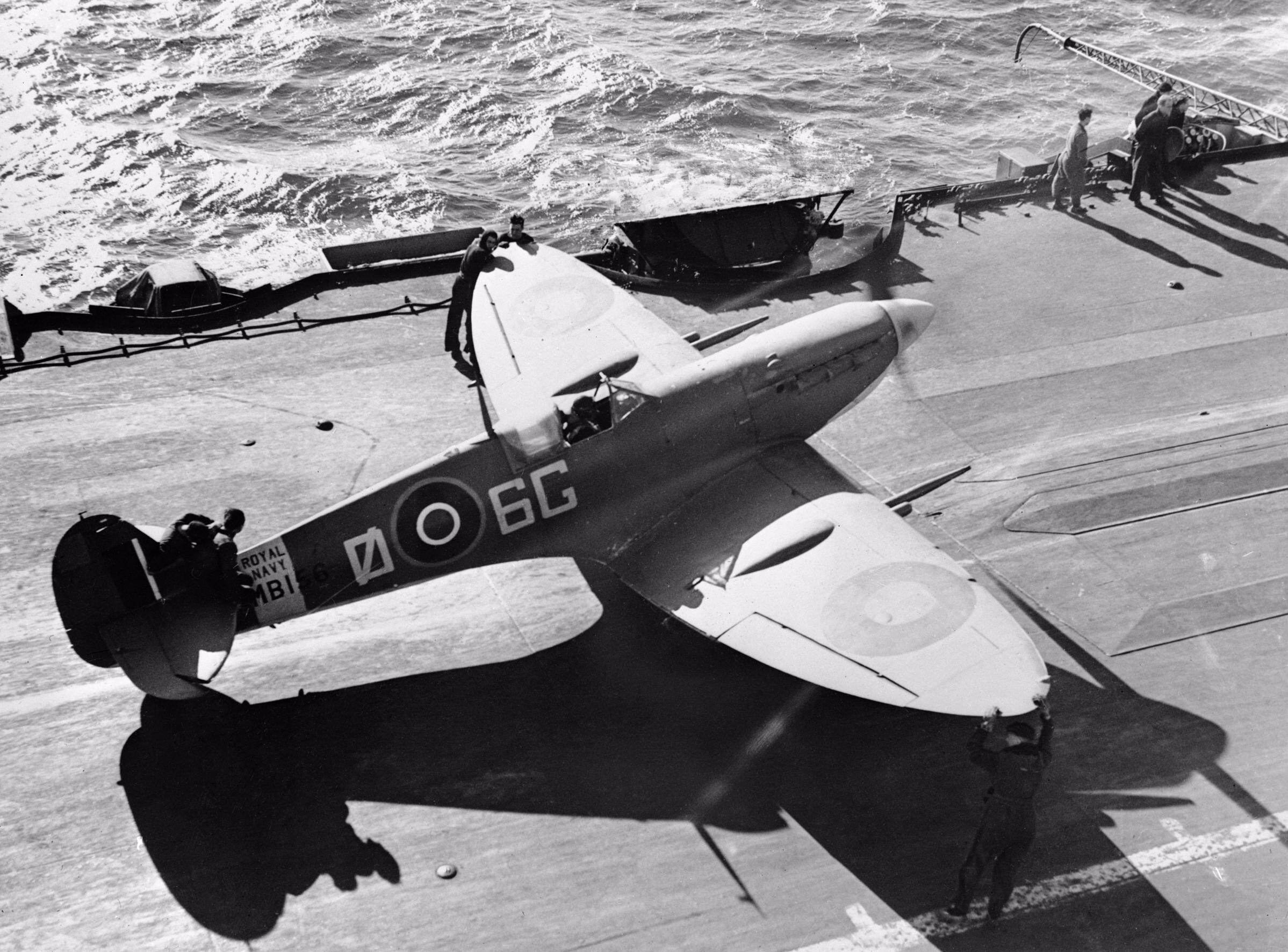
A Supermarine Seafire Mk IIc of 885 Naval Air Squadron on the deck of HMS Formidable in the Mediterranean, December 1942

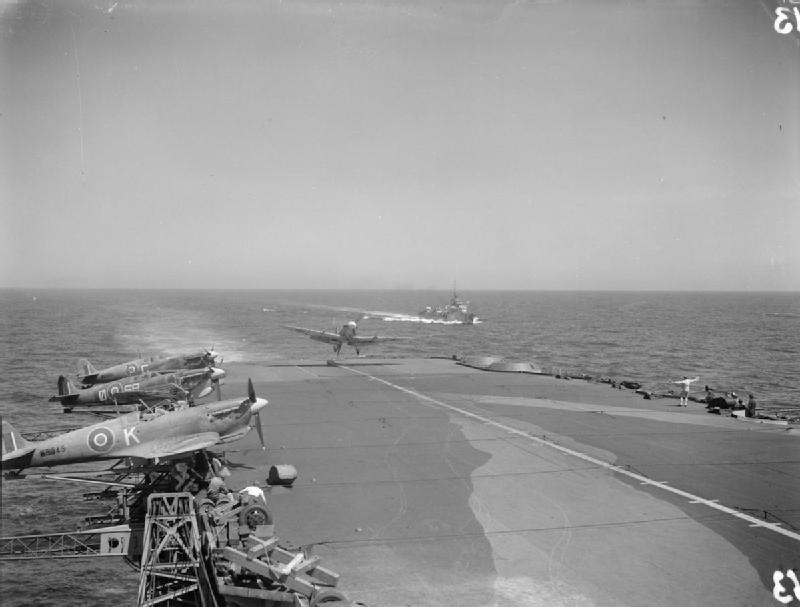
A Supermarine Seafire of 885 Naval Air Squadron about to "land out" on the deck of HMS Formidable at Gibraltar.

1941

- Royal Naval Air Station Dekheila (HMS Grebe), Alexandria, Egypt, (1 - 3 March 1941)
- HMS Eagle (3- 10 March 1941)
- Royal Naval Air Station Dekheila (HMS Grebe), Alexandria, Egypt, (10 March - 1 May 1941)
- disbanded - (1 May 1941)

1941 - 1943

- Royal Naval Air Station Yeovilton (HMS Heron), Somerset, (1 December 1941 – 6 February 1942)
- Royal Naval Air Station St Merryn (HMS Vulture), Cornwall, (6 February - 10 March 1942)
- Royal Naval Air Station Yeovilton (HMS Heron), Somerset, (10 - 14 March 1942)
- Royal Air Force Sherburn-in-Elmet, North Yorkshire, (14 - 22 March 1942)
- Royal Air Force Hutton Cranswick, Yorkshire, (12 Gp) (22 March - 16 June 1942)
- Royal Naval Air Station Machrihanish (HMS Landrail), Argyll and Bute, (16 - 23 June 1942)
- Royal Naval Air Station Hatston (HMS Sparrowhawk), Mainland, Orkney, (23 - 29 June 1942)
- HMS Victorious (29 June - 10 July 1942)
- Royal Naval Air Station Hatston (HMS Sparrowhawk), Mainland, Orkney, (10 - 31 July 1942)
- HMS Victorious (31 July - 22 August 1942)
- Royal Naval Air Station Lee-on-Solent (HMS Daedalus), Hampshire, (22 August - 16 September 1942)
- Royal Naval Air Station Machrihanish (HMS Landrail), Argyll and Bute, (16 September - 28 October 1942)
- HMS Formidable (28 October - 7 December 1942)
- RN Air Section Gibraltar, Gibraltar, (7 December 1942 – 5 January 1943)
- HMS Formidable (5 - 15 January 1943)
- La Senia Airfield, Algeria, (15 - 26 January 1943)
- HMS Formidable (26 January - 2 February 1943)
- La Senia Airfield, Algeria, (2 - 7 February 1943)
- HMS Formidable (7 - 8 February 1943)
- RN Air Section Gibraltar, Gibraltar, (8 February - 10 March 1943)
- HMS Formidable (10 - 15 March 1943)
- RN Air Section Tafaraoui, Algeria, (15 - 25 March 1943)
- HMS Formidable (25 -26 March 1943)
- RN Air Section Gibraltar, Gibraltar, (26 - 31 March 1943)
- HMS Formidable (31 March - 9 April 1943)
- RN Air Section Tafaraoui, Algeria, (9 - 14 April 1943)
- HMS Formidable (14 - 16 April 1943)
- RN Air Section Gibraltar, Gibraltar, (16 - 19 April 1943)
- HMS Formidable (19 April 1 May 1943)
- RN Air Section Tafaraoui, Algeria, (1 - 4 May 1943)
- HMS Formidable (4 - 7 May 1943)
- RN Air Section Gibraltar, Gibraltar, (7 - 28 May 1943)
- HMS Formidable (28 May - 2 June 1943)
- RN Air Section Tafaraoui, Algeria, (2 - 4 June 1943)
- HMS Formidable (4 June 31 July 1943)
- RN Air Section Ta Kali, Malta, (31 July - 21 August 1943)
- HMS Formidable (21 - 24 August 1943)
- Royal Naval Air Station Dekheila (HMS Grebe), Alexandria, Egypt, (24 - 28 August 1943)
- HMS Formidable (28 - 30 August 1943)
- RN Air Section Ta Kali, Malta, (30 August - 5 September 1943)
- HMS Formidable (5 - 12 September 1943)
  - Paestum Airfield, Italy, (Detachment two aircraft 7–11 September 1943)
  - HMS Unicorn (Detachment two aircraft 11 September - 10 October 1943)
- RN Air Section Ta Kali, Malta, (12 - September 1943)
- Sidi Ahmed Airfield, Tunisia, (15 - 16 September 1943)
- RN Air Section Ta Kali, Malta, (16 - 20 September 1943)
- HMS Formidable (20 - 22 September 1943)
- RN Air Section Gibraltar, Gibraltar, (22 September - 5 October 1943)
- HMS Formidable (5 - 19 October 1943)
- Royal Naval Air Station Lee-on-Solent (HMS Daedalus), Hampshire, (19 October - 15 November 1943)
- disbanded - (15 November 1943)

1944 - 1945

- Royal Naval Air Station Lee-on-Solent (HMS Daedalus), Hampshire, (15 - 19 February 1944)
- Royal Naval Air Station St Merryn (HMS Vulture), Cornwall, (19 February - 31 March 1944)
- Royal Naval Air Station Henstridge (HMS Dipper), Somerset, (31 March - 22 April 1944)
- Royal Air Force Dundonald, South Ayrshire, (22 April - 5 May 1944)
- Royal Naval Air Station Ayr (HMS Wagtail), South Ayrshire, (6 - 13 May 1944)
- Royal Naval Air Station Lee-on-Solent (HMS Daedalus), Hampshire, (13 May - 4 August 1944)
- Royal Naval Air Station Ballyhalbert, County Down, (4 August - 16 December 1944)
  - Royal Air Force Hawarden, Flintshire, (Detachment six aircraft 1 September - 13 October 1944)
- HMS Ruler (16–19 December 1944)
- Royal Naval Air Station Ayr (HMS Wagtail), South Ayrshire, (19 - 30 December 1944)
- HMS Ruler (30 December - 20 March 1944)
- Royal Naval Air Station Schofields (HMS Nabthorpe), New South Wales, (20 March - 4 April 1945)
- HMS Ruler (4 - 5 April 1945)
- Royal Naval Air Station Schofields (HMS Nabthorpe), New South Wales, (5 - 14 April 1945)
- HMS Ruler (14 April - 5 September 1945)
  - Royal Naval Air Station Ponam (HMS Nabaron), Ponum Island, Admiralty Islands, (Detachment 31 May - 12 June 1945)
  - Royal Naval Air Station Ponam (HMS Nabaron), Ponum Islands, Admiralty Islands, (Detachment twelve aircraft 19–28 June 1945)
- HMS Indefatigable (5 - 18 September 1945)
- Royal Naval Air Station Schofields (HMS Nabthorpe), New South Wales, (18 - 27 September 1945)
- disbanded - (27 September 1945)

== Commanding officers ==
List of commanding officers of 885 Naval Air Squadron:

1941

- Lieutenant Commander J.N. Garnett, RN, from 1 March 1941
- disbanded - 1 May 1941

1941 - 1943

- Lieutenant E.D.G. Lewin, RN from 1 December 1941
- Lieutenant Commander(A) R.H.P. Carver, DSC, RN, from 2 February 1942
- disbanded - 15 December 1943

1944 - 1945

- Lieutenant Commander(A) S.L. Devonald, RN, from 15 February 1944
- Lieutenant Commander(A) J.R. Routley, RNVR, from 7 November 1944
- disbanded - 27 September 1945

Note: Abbreviation (A) signifies Air Branch of the RN or RNVR.
