= 21st Aircraft Carrier Squadron =

Former aircraft carrier formation of the Royal Navy

- Active: March-December 1945
- Country: United Kingdom
- Branch: Royal Navy
- Type: Squadron
- Garrison/HQ: Trincomalee, Ceylon

Commanders
- Notable commanders: Rear-Admiral Geoffrey Oliver

The 21st Aircraft Carrier Squadron also called Twenty First Aircraft Carrier Squadron was a Royal Navy aircraft carrier formation from March 1945 to December 1945.

During its existence the squadron's usual composition varied depending on its operational orders. It included a Dido-class light cruiser that served as its flagship, four to five escort carriers of the Attacker-class and Ruler-class, as well as four supporting destroyers of different classes. During Operation Dracula the squadron also included a second cruiser of the Dido class in support of the main force.

== History ==
The 21st Aircraft Carrier Squadron was established in March 1945 as part of reinforcements sent to the Indian Ocean and was assigned to the East Indies Fleet. On 25 April 1945 the squadron took part in Operation Dracula as part of Force W along with the 3rd Battle Squadron. Its responsibility was to provide daylight air cover during the initial stages of the operation until May 1945. From 10 August 1945 to 15 August 1945 it took part in Operation Carson as a component of Force 61. The squadron remained in existence until December 1945 when it was disbanded.

== Commanders ==
Commodore/Rear-Admiral, Commanding, 21st Aircraft Carrier Squadron
	Rank	Flag	Name	Term
1	Commodore		Geoffrey Oliver	1 March 1945 to 21 August 1945
2	Rear Admiral	Rear-Admiral - Royal Navy	Geoffrey Oliver	21 August 1945 to December 1945

== Composition ==
=== Reinforcements sent to the Indian Ocean in March 1945 ===
21st Aircraft Carrier Squadron, March 1945
Ship	Dates	Notes
HMS Royalist	March to April 1945	Dido-class light cruiser and flagship
HMS Hunter	March to April 1945	Attacker-class escort carrier
HMS Emperor	March to April 1945	Ruler-class escort carrier
HMS Stalker	March to April 1945	Attacker-class escort carrier
HMS Blackmore	March to April 1945	Hunt-class destroyer
HMS Nubian	March to April 1945	Tribal-class destroyer
HMS Tenacious	March to April 1945	T-class destroyer
HMS Termagant	March to April 1945	T-class destroyer
HMS Troubridge	March to April 1945	T-class destroyer

=== Operation Dracula, April to May 1945 ===
21st Aircraft Carrier Squadron, April to May 1945
Ship	Dates	Notes
HMS Royalist	April to May 1945	Dido-class light cruiser and flagship
HMS Phoebe	April to May 1945	Dido-class light cruiser
HMS Emperor	April to May 1945	escort carrier
HMS Hunter	April to May 1945	escort carrier
HMS Khedive	April to May 1945	escort carrier
HMS Stalker	April to May 1945	escort carrier
HMS Saumarez	April to May 1945	S-class destroyer
HMS Venus	April to May 1945	V-class destroyer
HMS Vigilant	April to May 1945	V-class destroyer
HMS Virago	April to May 1945	V-class destroyer

=== Operation Carson, 10 to 15 August 1945 ===
Operation Carson, 10-15 August 1945
Ship	Dates	Notes
HMS Royalist	10 to 15 August 1945	Dido-class light cruiser and flagship
HMS Ameer	10 to 15 August 1945	escort carrier
HMS Emperor	10 to 15 August 1945	escort carrier
HMS Empress	10 to 15 August 1945	escort carrier
HMS Khedive	10 to 15 August 1945	escort carrier
HMS Shah	10 to 15 August 1945	escort carrier
HMS Penn	10 to 15 August 1945	P class destroyer from 10th Destroyer Flotilla
HMS Verulam	10 to 15 August 1945	V class destroyer from 10th DF
HMS Tartar	10 to 15 August 1945	Tribal class destroyer from 10th DF

== Sources ==
- Chant, Christopher. "Carson: Operations & Codenames of WWII". codenames.info. C. Chant, 24 May 2018.
- Kindell, Don. "East Indies Fleet War Diary 1945". Admiralty War Diaries of World War 2. www.naval-history.net. Gordon Smith, 15 July 2011.
- Watson, Dr Graham. "Royal Navy Organization in World War 2, 1939-1945". www.naval-history.net. Gordon Smith, 19 September 2015.
- Wynn, Kenneth G. (2015). "1: Introduction". Men of The Battle of Britain: A Biographical Dictionary of The Few. Barnsley, England: Frontline Books. ISBN 9781473847682.
