= HMS Khedive =

Escort carrier

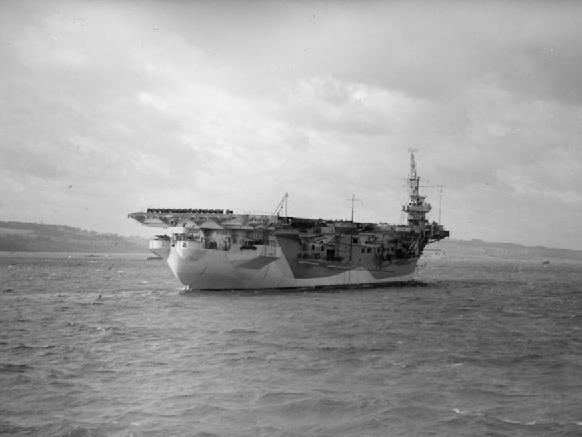
- HMS Khedive

History

United States
- Name: USS Cordova
- Namesake: Cordova Bay in Alaska
- Builder: Seattle-Tacoma Shipbuilding Corporation
- Laid down: 22 September 1942
- Launched: 30 January 1943
- Fate: Transferred to Royal Navy

United Kingdom
- Name: HMS Khedive
- Commissioned: 25 August 1943
- Decommissioned: 19 July 1946
- Identification: Pennant number:D62
- Fate: Sold as merchant ship; for scrap 1975

General characteristics
- Class & type: Bogue-class escort carrier (USA); Ruler-class escort carrier (UK)
- Displacement: 16,620 tons (full)
- Length: 495 ft 7 in (151.05 m)
- Beam: 69 ft 6 in (21.18 m)
- Draught: 26 ft (7.9 m)
- Propulsion: Steam turbines, 1 shaft, 8,500 shp (6.3 MW)
- Speed: 18 knots (33 km/h)
- Complement: 646 officers and men
- Armament: 2 × 4"/50, 5"/38 or 5"/51 guns; 8 × twin 40 mm Bofors; 35 × single 20 mm Oerlikon
- Aircraft carried: 18-24

USS Cordova (CVE-39) (originally AVG-39 then later ACV-39) was an escort carrier launched 27 December 1942 by Seattle-Tacoma Shipbuilding of Tacoma, Washington; sponsored by Mrs. A. E. Mitchell. Reclassified CVE-39 on 15 July 1943, Cordova was transferred to the Royal Navy on 25 August 1943, as HMS Khedive (D62)

Khedive served as the command ship for the Allied landings in southern France, in August 1944. From April to August 1945, she was with the East Indies Fleet as part of the 21st Aircraft Carrier Squadron. Khedive was to take part in the invasion of Singapore in September 1945, codenamed Operation Tiderace. But with the Japanese surrender, she was merely deployed to the island for security.

She was returned to United States custody on 26 January 1946 and sold into merchant service 23 January 1947 as Rempang (later Daphne). She was sold for scrap in Spain in 1975.

== Design and description ==
These ships were all larger and had a greater aircraft capacity than all the preceding American built escort carriers. They were also all laid down as escort carriers and not converted merchant ships. All the ships had a complement of 646 men and an overall length of 492 feet 3 inches (150.0 m), a beam of 69 feet 6 inches (21.2 m) and a draught of 25 ft 6 in (7.8 m). Propulsion was provided by a steam turbine, two boilers connected to one shaft giving 9,350 shaft horsepower (6,970 kW), which could propel the ship at 16.5 knots (30.6 km/h; 19.0 mph).

Aircraft facilities were a small combined bridge–flight control on the starboard side, two aircraft lifts 43 feet (13.1 m) by 34 feet (10.4 m), one aircraft catapult and nine arrestor wires. Aircraft could be housed in the 260 feet (79.2 m) by 62 feet (18.9 m) hangar below the flight deck. Armament comprised: two 4"/50, 5"/38 or 5"/51 Dual Purpose guns in single mounts, sixteen 40 mm Bofors anti-aircraft guns in twin mounts and twenty 20 mm Oerlikon anti-aircraft cannons in single mounts. They had a maximum aircraft capacity of twenty-four aircraft which could be a mixture of Hellcat, Vought F4U Corsair or Hawker Sea Hurricane fighter aircraft and or Grumman Avenger anti-submarine aircraft.
