= Operation Sunfish =

Operation Sunfish was a military operation by Allied troops in April 1945. It involved the battleships HMS Queen Elizabeth and French battleship Richelieu. Their aircraft carried out a photo reconnaissance sweep of the area around Port Swettenham, 200 miles north of Singapore, on 14–16 April, before concluding the raid with an attack on Emmahaven (northern Sumatra) and Padang. It had its origins in the proposed Operation Sounder.
