= HMS Stalker (D91) =

1942 Attacker-class escort carrier of the Royal Navy

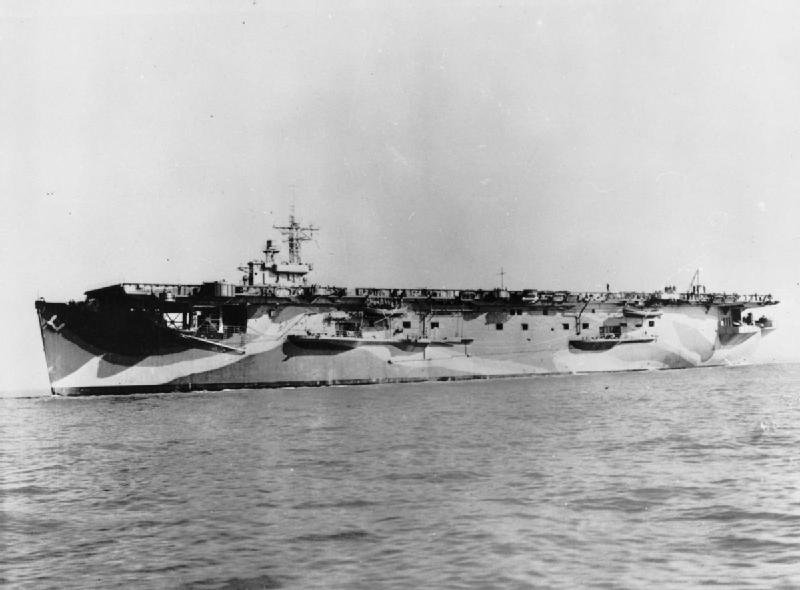
- HMS Stalker January 1943

History

United States
- Name: USS Hamlin
- Namesake: Hamlin Sound in South Carolina
- Builder: Western Pipe and Steel Company
- Laid down: 6 October 1941
- Launched: 5 March 1942
- Fate: Transferred to Royal Navy 21 December 1942

United Kingdom
- Name: HMS Stalker
- Commissioned: 21 December 1942
- Decommissioned: 29 December 1945
- Stricken: 20 March 1946
- Fate: Sold as a merchant ship; scrapped 1975

General characteristics
- Class & type: Attacker-class escort carrier
- Displacement: 14,400 tons
- Length: 491 ft 6 in (149.81 m)
- Beam: 105 ft (32 m)
- Draught: 26 ft (7.9 m)
- Propulsion: Steam turbines, 1 shaft, 8,500 shp (6,300 kW)
- Speed: 18 knots (33 km/h; 21 mph)
- Complement: 646
- Armament: 2 × 4"/50, 5"/38 or 5"/51 guns; 8 × 40 mm AA; 20 × 20 mm guns AA
- Aircraft carried: 20

Service record
- Operations: Salerno landings (1943); Operation Dragoon (1944); Operation Tiderace (1945)

USS Hamlin (CVE-15) was one of a large group of escort aircraft carriers built on Maritime Commission C-3 hulls and transferred to the Royal Navy under Lend Lease during World War II. The ship was launched by Western Pipe and Steel Company, San Francisco, California, on 5 March 1942, as AVG-15, aircraft escort vessel. She was sponsored by Mrs. William H. Shea. Her designation was changed to ACV-15, auxiliary aircraft carrier, 20 August 1942, and she was acquired and simultaneously transferred to the United Kingdom 21 December 1942. Hamlin's designation was changed to CVE-15, escort aircraft carrier, 15 July 1943.

Renamed HMS Stalker (D91), the escort carrier played a vital part in allied operations in the Atlantic. She participated in the Salerno landings in September 1943, providing effective on the spot air support for assault forces. Stalker also took part in the important landings in southern France in August 1944. From March to April 1945 she was attached to the 21st Aircraft Carrier Squadron. Returned to the United States 29 December 1945, she was struck from the Navy Register 20 March 1946 and sold to Waterman Steamship Corp. of Mobile, Alabama, 18 December 1946. Waterman in turn sold her to the Netherlands in August 1947 where she was converted to the merchant ship Riouw. Later renamed Lobito in 1968, she was scrapped in Taiwan in September 1975.

== Design and description ==
There were eight Attacker-class escort carriers in service with the Royal Navy during the Second World War. They were built between 1941 and 1942 by Ingalls Shipbuilding and Western Pipe & Steel shipyards in the United States, both building four ships each.

The ships had a complement of 646 men and accommodation of Royal Navy mess hall control food. The separate messes no longer had to prepare their own food, as everything was cooked in the galley and served cafeteria style in a central dining area. They were also equipped with a modern laundry and a barber shop. The traditional hammocks were replaced by three tier bunk beds, eighteen to a cabin which were hinged and could be tied up to provide extra space when not in use.

The ships dimensions were; an overall length of 492.25 feet (150.04 m), a beam of 69.5 feet (21.2 m) and a height of 23.25 ft (7.09 m). They had a displacement of 11,420 long tons (11,603 t) at deep load. Propulsion was provided by four diesel engines connected to one shaft giving 8,500 brake horsepower (6,300 kW), which could propel the ship at 17 knots (31 km/h; 20 mph).

Aircraft facilities were a small combined bridge–flight control on the starboard side and above the 450-by-120-foot (137 by 37 m) flight deck, two aircraft lifts 42 by 34 feet (13 by 10 m), and nine arrestor wires. Aircraft could be housed in the 260-by-62-foot (79 by 19 m) hangar below the flight deck. Armament comprised two 4"/50, 5"/38 or 5"/51 in single mounts, eight 40 mm anti-aircraft gun in twin mounts and twenty-one 20 mm guns anti-aircraft cannons in single or twin mounts. They had the capacity for up to eighteen aircraft which could be a mixture of Grumman Martlet, Hawker Sea Hurricane, Seafire, Vought F4U Corsair fighter aircraft and Fairey Swordfish or Grumman Avenger anti-submarine aircraft.

== Bibliography ==
- Cocker, Maurice (2008). Aircraft-Carrying Ships of the Royal Navy. Stroud, Gloucestershire: The History Press. ISBN 978-0-7524-4633-2.
- Poolman, Kenneth (1972). Escort Carrier 1941–1945. London: Ian Allan. ISBN 0-7110-0273-8.
