= Paestum Airfield =

WW2 military airfield in Campania, Italy

Paestum Airfield
- Part of Twelfth Air Force

Site information
- Type: Military airfield
- Controlled by: United States Army Air Forces

Location
- Coordinates: 40°25′21.65″N 015°00′38.27″E (Approximate)

Site history
- Built: 1943
- In use: 1943-1944

Location of Paestum Airfield, Italy

Paestum Airfield is an abandoned World War II military airfield in Italy, located approximately 9 km north-northeast of Agropoli, in the province of Salerno, in the Campania region of Italy.

It was an all-weather temporary field built by the United States Army Air Force XII Engineer Command using a graded earth compacted surface, with a prefabricated hessian (burlap) surfacing known as PHS. PHS was made of an asphalt-impregnated jute which was rolled out over the compacted surface over a square mesh track (SMT) grid of wire joined in 3-inch squares. Pierced Steel Planking was also used for parking areas, as well as for dispersal sites, when it was available. In addition, tents were used for billeting and also for support facilities; an access road was built to the existing road infrastructure; a dump for supplies, ammunition, and gasoline drums, along with a drinkable water and minimal electrical grid for communications and station lighting.

Once completed it was turned over for use by the Twelfth Air Force 33d Fighter Group which operated P-40 Warhawks from the field between 13 September-18 November 1943, supporting ground forces as they advanced and attacking enemy aircraft on the air and ground. Later, the 340th Bombardment Group operated B-25 Mitchell medium bombers from the field between 23 March and 14 April 1944.

After the 340th moved out the airfield was dismantled. Today, there are no remaining traces of the airfield as the area around the town of Paestum are heavily farmed and the agricultural use has obliterated any trace of the airfield. It is unknown precisely where the airfield was actually located due to the changed landscape over the past 60 years.
