= List of ship commissionings in 1943 =

The list of ship commissionings in 1943 includes a chronological list of ships commissioned in 1943. In cases where no official commissioning ceremony was held, the date of service entry may be used instead.

Date	Operator	Ship	Class and type	Notes	Ref
9 January	Royal Navy	Hunter	Attacker-class escort carrier	Lend-Lease acquisition, former USS Block Island	
13 January	Royal Navy	Whimbrel	Black Swan-class sloop		
14 January	United States Navy	Independence	Independence-class aircraft carrier		
31 January	Royal Navy	Tracker	Attacker-class escort carrier	Lend-Lease acquisition	
17 February	United States Navy	Lexington	Essex-class aircraft carrier		
20 February	United States Navy	Barnes	Bogue-class escort carrier		
22 February	United States Navy	Iowa	Iowa-class battleship		
25 February	United States Navy	Princeton	Independence-class aircraft carrier		
27 February	Royal Navy	Fencer	Attacker-class escort carrier	Lend-Lease acquisition, former USS Croatan	
1 March	Royal Navy	Kite	Black Swan-class sloop		
8 March	United States Navy	Block Island	Bogue-class escort carrier		
31 March	United States Navy	Belleau Wood	Independence-class aircraft carrier		
1 April	Royal Navy	Starling	Black Swan-class sloop		
7 April	Royal Navy	Searcher	Attacker-class escort carrier	Lend-Lease acquisition	
9 April	Royal Navy	Chaser	Attacker-class escort carrier	Lend-Lease acquisition, former USS Breton	
9 April	United States Navy	Prince William	Bogue-class escort carrier		
10 April	United States Navy	Edsall	Edsall-class destroyer escort		
12 April	United States Navy	Breton	Bogue-class escort carrier		
15 April	United States Navy	Yorktown	Essex-class aircraft carrier		
23 April	United States Navy	Abbot	Fletcher-class destroyer	at Boston Navy Yard under command of Commander Chester E. Carroll	
25 April	Royal Navy	Ravager	Attacker-class escort carrier	Lend-Lease acquisition	
28 April	United States Navy	Croatan	Bogue-class escort carrier		
28 April	Royal Navy	Striker	Attacker-class escort carrier	Lend-Lease acquisition, former USS Prince William	
5 May	Royal Norwegian Navy	MTB 345	torpedo boat	transferred from the Royal Navy	
12 May	Royal Navy	Pheasant	Black Swan-class sloop	modified	
13 May	United States Navy	Bataan	Independence-class aircraft carrier		
23 May	United States Navy	New Jersey	Iowa-class battleship		
24 May	United States Navy	Bunker Hill	Essex-class aircraft carrier		
28 May	United States Navy	Cowpens	Independence-class aircraft carrier		
31 May	United States Navy	Pybus	Bogue-class escort carrier		
8 June	Royal Navy	Savage	S and T-class destroyer	modified	
9 June	United States Navy	Daniel T. Griffin	Buckley-class destroyer escort		
11 June	Royal Navy	Pursuer	Attacker-class escort carrier	Lend-Lease acquisition, former USS St. George	
17 June	United States Navy	Monterey	Independence-class aircraft carrier		
28 June	United States Navy	Baffins	Bogue-class escort carrier		
3 July	United States Navy	Glacier	Bogue-class escort carrier		
8 July	United States Navy	Casablanca	Casablanca-class escort carrier		
19 July	Royal Navy	Ameer	Attacker-class escort carrier	Lend-Lease acquisition, former USS Baffins	
22 July	United States Navy	Bolinas	Bogue-class escort carrier		
24 July	United States Navy	Cabot	Independence-class aircraft carrier		
1 August	Royal Navy	Atheling	Attacker-class escort carrier	Lend-Lease acquisition, former USS Glacier	
4 August	Royal Navy	Trumpeter	Attacker-class escort carrier	Lend-Lease acquisition, former USS Bastian	
6 August	Royal Navy	Emperor	Attacker-class escort carrier	Lend-Lease acquisition, former USS Pybus	
7 August	United States Navy	Liscome Bay	Casablanca-class escort carrier		
11 August	Royal Navy	Slinger	Attacker-class escort carrier	Lend-Lease acquisition, former USS Chatham	
12 August	Royal Navy	Begum	Attacker-class escort carrier	Lend-Lease acquisition, former USS Bolinas	
12 August	Royal Navy	Empress	Attacker-class escort carrier	Lend-Lease acquisition, former USS Carnegie	
16 August	United States Navy	Intrepid	Essex-class aircraft carrier		
17 August	United States Navy	Wasp	Essex-class aircraft carrier		
25 August	Royal Navy	Khedive	Attacker-class escort carrier	Lend-Lease acquisition, former USS Cordova	
27 August	United States Navy	Coral Sea	Casablanca-class escort carrier		
30 August	Royal Navy	Magpie	Black Swan-class sloop	modified	
31 August	United States Navy	Corregidor	Casablanca-class escort carrier		
31 August	United States Navy	Langley	Independence-class aircraft carrier		
2 September	Kriegsmarine	Schnelles Geleitboot 4	Sans Souci-class sloop		
7 September	Royal Navy	Nabob	Bogue-class escort carrier	Lend-Lease acquisition, former USS Edisto	
13 September	United States Navy	Mission Bay	Casablanca-class escort carrier		
25 September	United States Navy	Guadalcanal	Casablanca-class escort carrier		
27 September	Royal Navy	Shah	Attacker-class escort carrier	Lend-Lease acquisition, former USS Jamaica	
29 September	United States Navy	Molala	Abnaki-class fleet ocean tug		
5 October	United States Navy	Manila Bay	Casablanca-class escort carrier		
14 October	United States Navy	Natoma Bay	Casablanca-class escort carrier		
22 October	Royal Navy	Patroller	Attacker-class escort carrier	Lend-Lease acquisition, former USS Keweenaw	
23 October	United States Navy	Midway	Casablanca-class escort carrier		
31 October	United States Navy	Tripoli	Casablanca-class escort carrier		
2 November	Royal Navy	Amethyst	Black Swan-class sloop	modified	
3 November	Royal Navy	Premier	Attacker-class escort carrier	Lend-Lease acquisition, former USS Estero	
7 November	United States Navy	Wake Island	Casablanca-class escort carrier		
8 November	Royal Navy	Ranee	Attacker-class escort carrier	Lend-Lease acquisition, former USS Niantic	
15 November	United States Navy	White Plains	Casablanca-class escort carrier		
19 November	Royal Navy	Thane	Attacker-class escort carrier	Lend-Lease acquisition, former USS Sunset	
20 November	Royal Navy	Speaker	Attacker-class escort carrier	Lend-Lease acquisition, former USS Delgada	
21 November	United States Navy	Solomons	Casablanca-class escort carrier	Former HMS Emperor	
25 November	United States Navy	Abnaki	Abnaki-class fleet ocean tug		
27 November	United States Navy	Kalinin Bay	Casablanca-class escort carrier		
29 November	United States Navy	Hornet	Essex-class aircraft carrier		
4 December	United States Navy	Kasaan Bay	Casablanca-class escort carrier		
7 December	Royal Navy	Queen	Attacker-class escort carrier	Lend-Lease acquisition, former USS St. Andrews	
9 December	United States Navy	Fanshaw Bay	Casablanca-class escort carrier		
15 December	United States Navy	Kitkun Bay	Casablanca-class escort carrier		
15 December	United States Navy	San Jacinto	Independence-class aircraft carrier		
16 December	United States Navy	Grapple	Diver-class rescue and salvage ship		
21 December	United States Navy	Tulagi	Casablanca-class escort carrier		
22 December	Royal Navy	Ruler	Attacker-class escort carrier	Lend-Lease acquisition, former USS St. Joseph	
28 December	United States Navy	Gambier Bay	Casablanca-class escort carrier		
31 December	Royal Navy	Arbiter	Attacker-class escort carrier	Lend-Lease acquisition, former USS St. Simon	
