= 7th Naval Fighter Wing =

Royal Navy Fleet Air Arm aircraft wing

- White Ensign
- Active: 30 October 1943 – 16 December 1944
- Country: United Kingdom
- Branch: Royal Navy
- Type: Naval fighter Wing
- Role: Fleet air defence, fighter-bomber, reconnaissance
- Size: Three / six squadrons
- Part of: Fleet Air Arm
- Aircraft carriers: HMS Emperor; HMS Pursuer; HMS Searcher
- Engagements: World War II: European theatre of World War II; Operation Tungsten; Operation Dragoon; Operation Outing; Operation Manna; Operation Contempt

Commanders
- Notable commanders: Lieutenant Commander(A) M.F. Fell, DSO, RN

Insignia
- Wing Code: W

Aircraft flown
- Fighter: Grumman Hellcat F. Mk. I & F. Mk. II; Grumman Wildcat Mk V & Mk VI

7th Naval Fighter Wing ("7 Wing") was a Fleet Air Arm formation of the Royal Navy during the Second World War. It was formed at RNAS Eglinton on 30 October 1943 with six squadrons: 800 and 804 Naval Air Squadrons, equipped with Grumman Hellcat fighter aircraft, for the assault carrier HMS Emperor, and 881, 896, 882 and 898 Naval Air Squadrons, equipped with Grumman Wildcat fighter aircraft for the escort carriers HMS Pursuer and HMS Searcher, respectively.

The wing operated with the Home Fleet during 1944, including Operation Tungsten, the carrier attack on the German battleship Tirpitz in Norway. In June and July 1944, 804, 896 and 898 Naval Air Squadrons were absorbed into their companion squadrons, reducing the wing from six squadrons to three. The wing subsequently deployed to the Mediterranean and participated in Operation Dragoon, the Allied landings in southern France, in August 1944. It then participated in operations in the Aegean Sea, although 881 and 882 Naval Air Squadrons returned to Britain after the September operations while 800 Squadron continued operations in the Aegean until November. The wing returned to Northern Ireland towards the end of 1944 and was disbanded on 16 December.

== History ==
=== Formation and organisation ===
The 7th Naval Fighter Wing was formed at RNAS Eglinton, County Londonderry, Northern Ireland, on 30 October 1943. Its original organisation reflected the Fleet Air Arm's wartime system of grouping squadrons associated with individual carriers into numbered naval wings. The wing comprised two Grumman Hellcat squadrons and four Grumman Wildcat squadrons.

The two Hellcat squadrons, 800 and 804 Naval Air Squadrons, were allocated to the Ruler class assault carrier HMS Emperor. The four Wildcat squadrons were divided between two escort carriers: 881 and 896 Naval Air Squadrons were allocated to Attacker-class escort carrier HMS Pursuer, while 882 and 898 Naval Air Squadrons were allocated to the Ruler-class escort carrier HMS Searcher.

Having two fighter squadrons in each carrier proved unwieldy, and the wing's organisation was consequently reduced during 1944 as the additional squadrons were absorbed into their companions.

=== Home Fleet ===
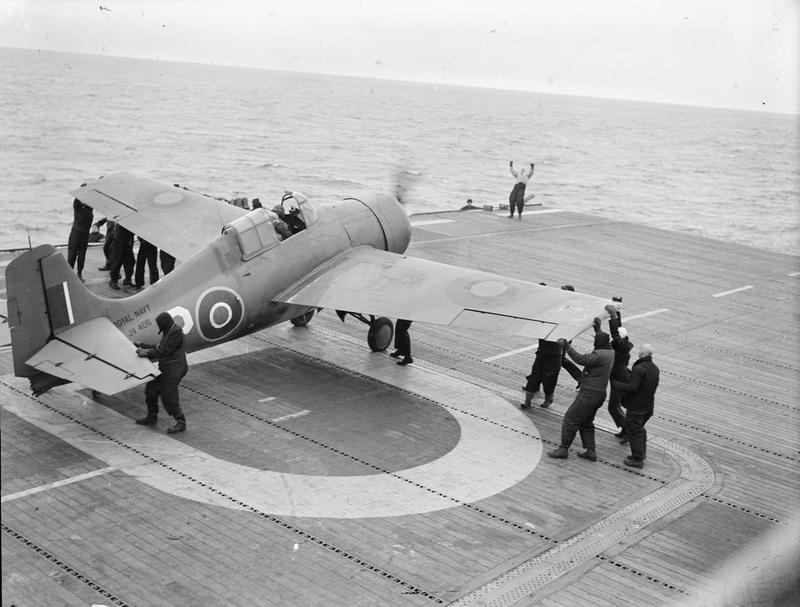
Grumman Wildcat on HMS Pursuer

During the winter of 1943–44 the wing undertook training and work-up activities in preparation for operational service. Its carriers subsequently operated with the Home Fleet in northern waters. In March 1944, HMS Emperor, HMS Pursuer and HMS Searcher joined the forces assembled for operations against German shipping and the German battleship Tirpitz in northern Norway.

The three carriers formed part of the escort-carrier force for Operation Tungsten, the major Fleet Air Arm attack on Tirpitz at Altafjord on 3 April 1944. The wing's squadrons continued to operate in northern waters during the spring of 1944, with the individual squadrons operating from their associated carriers.

=== Reorganisation ===
The two-squadron arrangement aboard each of the three carriers was progressively reduced during June and July 1944. On 12 June, 896 Naval Air Squadron was disbanded aboard HMS Pursuer and its aircraft and aircrew were absorbed into 881 Squadron. 804 Naval Air Squadron was disbanded aboard HMS Emperor on 18 June 1944 and its aircraft and aircrew were absorbed into 800 Squadron. 898 Naval Air Squadron was disbanded aboard HMS Searcher on 5 July 1944 and its aircraft and aircrew were absorbed into 882 Squadron.

The resulting wing consisted of three squadrons: 800 Naval Air Squadron operating Grumman Hellcats from HMS Emperor, 881 Naval Air Squadron operating Grumman Wildcats from HMS Pursuer, and 882 Naval Air Squadron operating Grumman Wildcats from HMS Searcher.

=== Mediterranean and Operation Dragoon ===
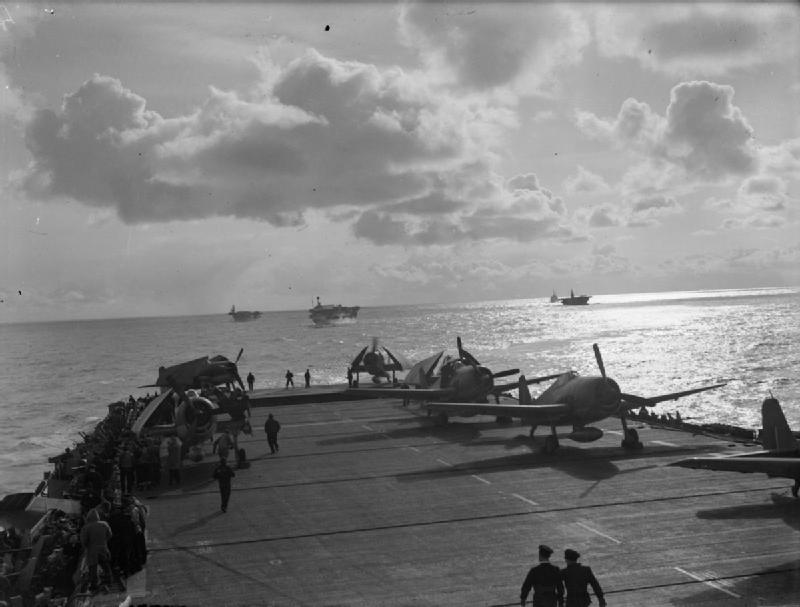
Grumman Hellcats on the deck of HMS Emperor

On 15 July 1944, the three carriers, HMS Emperor, HMS Pursuer and HMS Searcher, sailed from the Clyde for the Mediterranean as part of the forces being assembled for the invasion of southern France.

At Malta the carriers joined Task Force 88 for Operation Dragoon. The wing's three squadrons formed part of Task Group 88.1, with 800 Squadron aboard HMS Emperor, 881 Squadron aboard HMS Pursuer and 882 Squadron aboard HMS Searcher.

The Allied landings in southern France began on 15 August 1944. The wing's aircraft were employed in fighter cover, fighter-bomber attacks, tactical reconnaissance and bombardment spotting. On the first day of the operation, 800 Squadron flew its Grumman Hellcats for sorties from HMS Emperor, while 881 and 882 Squadrons operated their Grumman Wildcats from HMS Pursuer and HMS Searcher respectively.

=== Aegean operations ===
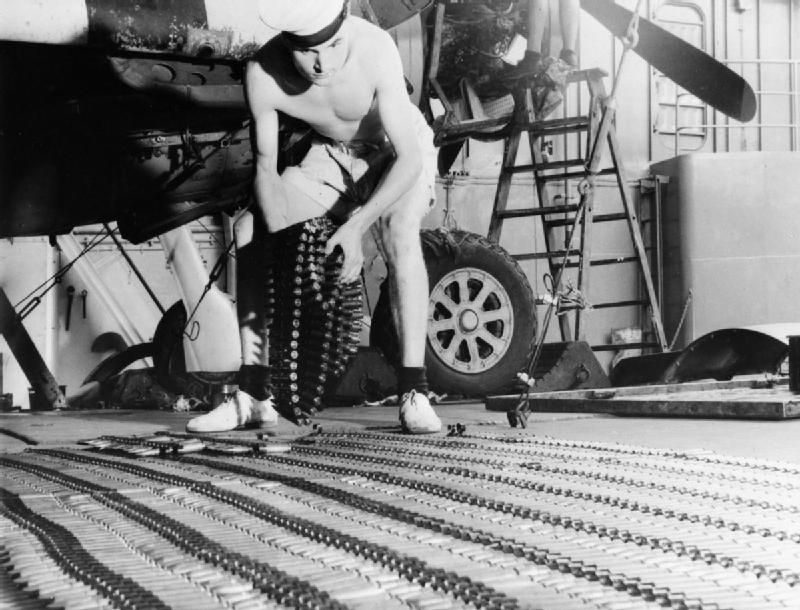
An armourer, surveying the strings of ammunition, laid out on the floor, that he is about to supply to the guns of a Grumman Hellcat of 800 Squadron, on board HMS Emperor

Following Operation Dragoon, the wing's escort carriers were employed in the Aegean Sea. A force including HMS Emperor, HMs Pursuer and HMS Searcher conducted operations against German positions, shipping and communications in the Aegean and eastern Mediterranean during September and October 1944.

The first major Aegean operation, designated Operation Outing, began in September. 881 Squadron, operating from HMS Pursuer and 882 Squadron, operating from HMS Searcher, took part in attacks on German positions and shipping in the Aegean, including operations around Crete and Rhodes. The first phase of the operation ended on 20 September.

HMS Pursuer and HMS Searcher subsequently returned to Britain, taking 881 and 882 Squadrons out of the Aegean campaign. HMS Emperor, however, remained in the theatre with 800 Squadron, which continued to conduct operations during October and November.

During the later Aegean operations, 800 Squadron conducted fighter-bomber and reconnaissance missions against German positions and installations. Targets included German radar facilities, while the squadron also provided fighter cover and support for Allied operations associated with the liberation of Greece. In October, 800 Squadron supported Operation Manna, the Allied reoccupation of mainland Greece, and subsequently took part in Operation Contempt against German positions on the island of Milos. HMS Emperor remained in the Aegean into November, when 800 Squadron carried out further operations before the carrier left the area.

HMS Emperor sailed for Alexandria, Egypt, on 20 November. 800 Squadron subsequently disembarked at RAF Long Kesh, Lisburn, Northern Ireland, on 29 November, marking the end of the squadron's Aegean operations.

=== Disbandment ===
Following the conclusion of its Aegean operations, the wing returned to Northern Ireland towards the end of 1944. Its remaining squadrons were transferred to other wings, and the 7th Naval Fighter Wing was disbanded on 16 December 1944.

== Squadrons ==
7th Naval Fighter Wing consisted of a number of Fleet Air Arm squadrons:

- 800 Naval Air Squadron, October 1943 – December 1944
- 804 Naval Air Squadron, October 1943 – June 1944
- 881 Naval Air Squadron, October 1943 – December 1944
- 896 Naval Air Squadron, October 1943 – June 1944
- 882 Naval Air Squadron, October 1943 – December 1944
- 898 Naval Air Squadron, October 1943 – July 1944

In June and July 1944, 804, 896 and 898 Naval Air Squadrons were absorbed into 800, 881 and 882 Naval Air Squadrons respectively.

== Naval air stations and carrier deployments ==
- Royal Naval Air Station Eglinton (HMS Gannet), County Londonderry.
  - The 7th Naval Fighter Wing was formed at RNAS Eglinton on 30 October 1943 with 800 and 804 Naval Air Squadrons for HMS Emperor, 881 and 896 Naval Air Squadrons for HMS Pursuer, and 882 and 898 Naval Air Squadrons for HMS Searcher. The squadrons subsequently undertook training and work-up activities before joining the Home Fleet.
- HMS Emperor — October 1943–November 1944.
  - 800 and 804 Naval Air Squadrons operated from HMS Emperor with Grumman Hellcats. The carrier operated with the Home Fleet during the spring of 1944, including Operation Tungsten against the German battleship Tirpitz. 804 Squadron was disbanded aboard HMS Emperor on 18 June 1944 and its aircraft and aircrew were absorbed into 800 Squadron. HMS Emperor subsequently participated in Operation Dragoon in August, and remained in the Aegean Sea with 800 Squadron until November.
- HMS Pursuer — October 1943–October 1944.
  - 881 and 896 Naval Air Squadrons operated from HMS Pursuer with Grumman Wildcats. The carrier operated with the Home Fleet in 1944, including in Operation Tungsten. 896 Squadron was disbanded aboard HMS Pursuer on 12 June 1944 and its aircraft and aircrew were absorbed into 881 Squadron. HMS Pursuer subsequently participated in Operation Dragoon and the September 1944 Aegean operations before returning to Britain with 881 Squadron.
- HMS Searcher — October 1943–October 1944.
  - 882 and 898 Naval Air Squadrons operated from HMS Searcher with Grumman Wildcats. The carrier operated with the Home Fleet during the spring of 1944, including Operation Tungsten. 898 Squadron was disbanded aboard HMS Searcher on 5 July 1944 and its aircraft and aircrew were absorbed into 882 Squadron. HMS Searcher subsequently participated in Operation Dragoon and the September 1944 Aegean operations before returning to Britain with 882 Squadron.
- Royal Air Force Long Kesh, Lisburn, Northern Ireland.
  - 800 Naval Air Squadron disembarked from HMS Emperor at RAF Long Kesh on 29 November following the escort carrier's return from the Aegean Sea. The wing subsequently returned to Northern Ireland, where its remaining squadrons were transferred to other wings before the 7th Naval Fighter Wing was disbanded on 16 December 1944.

== Aircraft ==
Naval Air Squadrons assigned to 7 Wing flew different variants of two aircraft types:

- Grumman Wildcat Mk V fighter aircraft (1943 - 1945)
- Grumman Wildcat Mk VI fighter aircraft (1944 - 1945)
- Grumman Hellcat F. Mk. I fighter aircraft (1943 - 1945)
- Grumman Hellcat F. Mk. II fighter aircraft (1944 - 1945)

== Wing leader ==
The wing was commanded by Lieutenant Commander(A) M.F. Fell, DSO, RN, from its formation on 30 October 1943 until its disbandment on 16 December 1944.

== See also ==
- Fleet Air Arm
- List of aircraft wings of the Royal Navy
- 800 Naval Air Squadron
- 804 Naval Air Squadron
- 881 Naval Air Squadron
- 896 Naval Air Squadron
- 882 Naval Air Squadron
- 898 Naval Air Squadron
- HMS Emperor
- HMS Pursuer
- HMS Searcher

== Bibliography ==
- Ballance, Theo; Howard, Lee; Sturtivant, Ray (2016). The Squadrons and Units of the Fleet Air Arm. Air-Britain (Historians) Ltd. ISBN 978-0-85130-489-2.
- Francis, Paul; Crisp, Graham (2008). Military Command and Control Organisation: Volume 1 – The Royal Navy. English Heritage.
- Wragg, David (2019). The Fleet Air Arm Handbook 1939–1945. The History Press.
