= 896 Naval Air Squadron =

Inactive flying squadron of the Royal Navy's Fleet Air Arm

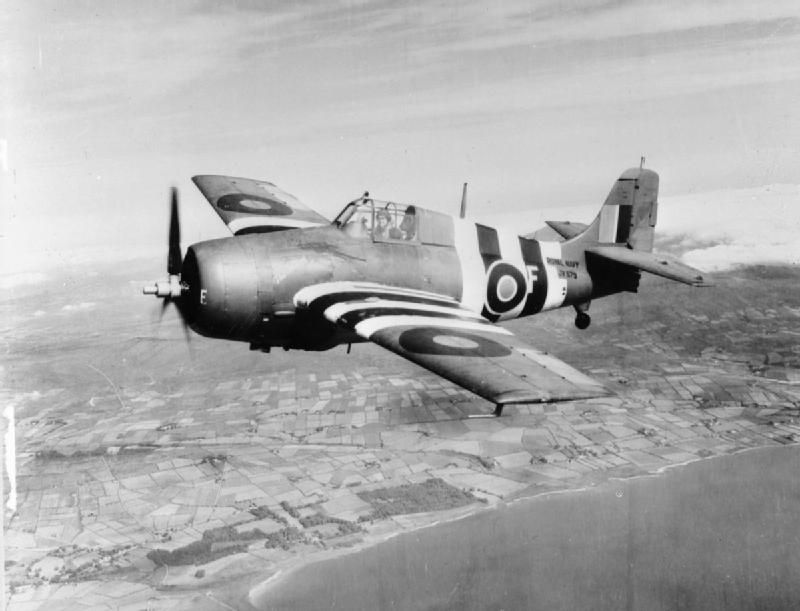
- A Fleet Air Arm Grumman Wildcat, an example of the type used by 896 NAS
- Active: 1942–1944; 1945
- Disbanded: 19 December 1945
- Country: United Kingdom
- Branch: Royal Navy
- Type: Single-seat fighter squadron
- Role: Carrier-based fighter squadron
- Part of: Fleet Air Arm
- Home station: See Naval air stations section for full list.
- Engagements: World War II: Operation Toenails; Operation Cartwheel; Operation Tungsten; Operation Neptune; Operation Collie; Operation Livery; Operation Carson; Operation Zipper
- Battle honours: Norway 1944; Atlantic 1944; Normandy 1944; Burma 1945; East Indies 1945

Commanders
- Notable commanders: Commander Stanley Orr, DSC & Two Bars, AFC, RN

Insignia
- Identification markings: single letters (Martlet/Wildcat); 8A+ (Martlet/Wildcat by February 1943 on HMS Victorious); 2A+ (Hellcat on HMS Ameer); B7+ and B8+ (Hellcat June 1945)

Aircraft flown
- Fighter: Grumman Martlet/Wildcat; Grumman Hellcat

896 Naval Air Squadron (896 NAS) was a Fleet Air Arm (FAA) naval air squadron of the United Kingdom’s Royal Navy (RN). Established as a fighter squadron in September 1942, at Norfolk, Virginia, the squadron joined HMS Victorious in February 1943, heading to the Pacific. In May 1943, it conducted fighter operations over the Coral Sea and later supported United States Marines landings in the Solomons in June 1943, using Tontouta as a shore station. The squadron returned to the UK, in September, having re-equipped with Grumman Wildcat aircraft and joined the 7th Naval Fighter Wing in November. It embarked in HMS Pursuer in November and provided air cover for a convoy to Gibraltar in February 1944. In April, it offered air support for an attack on the battleship Tirpitz before being disbanded into 881 Naval Air Squadron in June.

It reformed in September 1945, at HMS Malagas, RNAS Wingfield, South Africa, as a fighter squadron, with Grumman Hellcat fighter aircraft. It joined HMS Ameer in April for passage to Ceylon. In July 1945, the squadron conducted operations over the Nicobar Islands before moving to HMS Empress in July to support minesweeping operations near Phuket. The squadron returned home and was disbanded in December.

== History ==
=== Single-seat fighter squadron (1942-1944) ===
On 15 August 1942, personnel from 896 Naval Air Squadron gathered at RNAS Stretton (HMS Blackcap), Cheshire, England. Following their transatlantic journey aboard HMT Queen Mary, the squadron was officially established on 15 September at RN Air Section Norfolk, Virginia, as a single-seat fighter unit. The squadron was equipped with six Grumman Martlet Mk IV, an American carrier-based fighter aircraft. These were the counterparts to the US Navy's F4F-4B variant were generally comparable to the Mk II, featuring two extra wing-mounted guns and powered by the Wright Cyclone engine.

In January 1943, the USS Charger served as the carrier for deck landing exercises, following which the squadron was embarked in the Illustrious-class aircraft carrier, HMS Victorious on 1 February. This transition coincided with HMS Victorious's deployment to the Pacific, navigating through the Panama Canal to join forces with the United States Pacific Fleet. The USS Hornet was sunk, while the USS Enterprise incurred considerable damage during the Battle of the Santa Cruz Islands. This left the United States Navy with only one functioning fleet carrier, the USS Saratoga, in the Pacific theater. In light of a request for further carrier assistance, the British aircraft carrier HMS Victorious was provided to the US Navy on loan in late December 1942.

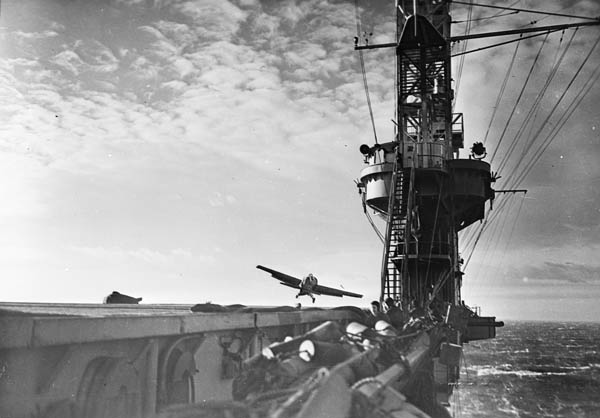
Grumman Wildcat Mk V of 881 or 896 Naval Air Squadron taking off from the escort carrier HMS Pursuer

In May 1943, aerial combat missions were conducted over the Coral Sea, subsequently assisting in the provision of air support for the landings executed by the United States Marines in the Solomon Islands in June 1943. During this period, Tontouta Air Base served as a shore base.

In conjunction with the other squadrons aboard HMS Victorious, 896 Naval Air Squadron underwent re-equipment with Grumman Wildcat Mk V fighter aircraft during its stop at RN Air Section Norfolk, Virginia, in September while en route back to the United Kingdom. This variant of the aircraft was analogous to the FM-1 Wildcat utilised by the United States Navy, which was produced by General Motors and featured the Pratt & Whitney Twin Wasp engine.

The squadron joined the 7th Naval Fighter Wing at RNAS Eglinton (HMS Gannet), County Down, Northern Ireland, in November, subsequently embarking on HMS Pursuer on November 26. The unit then set sail to offer air support for a convoy bound for Gibraltar in February 1944. In April 1944, the squadron played a crucial role in providing air cover during an assault on the German battleship Tirpitz. In June, during the Normandy landings operation, 896 Naval Air Squadron was integrated into 881 Naval Air Squadron while performing escort duties in the Western Channel aboard HMS Pursuer.

=== Grumman Hellcat (1945) ===
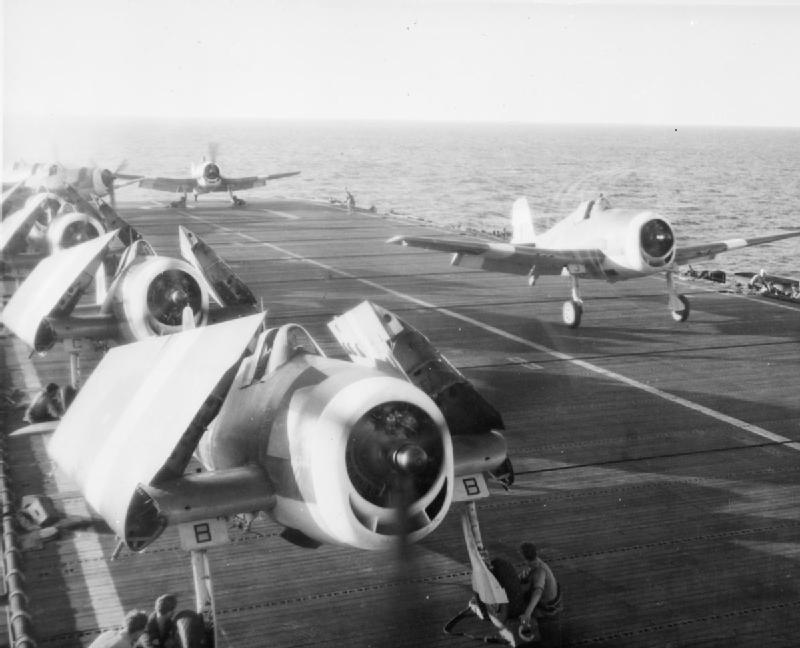
Grumman Hellcats taking off from HMS Ameer

On 5 November 1944, personnel designated for the newly established 896 Naval Air Squadron boarded a troopship in Liverpool, reaching Wingfield, Cape Town, South Africa, by 5 January 1945. The squadron was reformed as a single-seat fighter unit on 9 January, equipped with twenty-four Grumman Hellcat F. Mk. II fighter aircraft and subsequently set sail for Ceylon aboard the Ruler-class escort carrier, HMS Ameer, in April. This version of the Grumman Hellcat was comparable to the F6F-5 Hellcat of the United States Navy and was equipped with the Pratt & Whitney R-2800 Double Wasp engine.

In July, aerial support and bombing missions were conducted in the Nicobar Islands, after which 896 Naval Air Squadron was reassigned to the escort carrier, HMS Empress to conduct fighter patrols during minesweeping activities off the coast of Phuket Island later that month. After V-J Day, assistance was rendered in early September during the occupation of the Malayan Peninsula. Subsequently, the ship returned to its home port, and the squadron was officially disbanded upon its arrival on 19 December 1945.

== Aircraft operated ==
The squadron has operated a couple of different aircraft types, including:

- Grumman Martlet Mk IV fighter aircraft (September 1942 - September 1943)
- Grumman Wildcat Mk V fighter aircraft (September 1943 - June 1944)
- Grumman Hellcat F. Mk. II fighter aircraft (January - November 1945)

== Battle honours ==
The battle honours awarded to 896 Naval Air Squadron are:

- Norway 1944
- Atlantic 1944
- Normandy 1944
- Burma 1945
- East Indies 1945

== Naval air stations and aircraft carriers ==
896 Naval Air Squadron operated from a number of naval air stations of the Royal Navy in the UK and overseas, and also a number of Royal Navy fleet carriers and escort carriers and other airbases overseas:

1942 - 1944

- RN Air Section Norfolk, Virginia, (15 September - 2 November 1942)
- RN Air Section Quonset Point, Rhode Island, (2 November 1942 - 1 February 1943)
  - RN Air Section Norfolk, Virginia, (Deck landing training (DLT) USS Charger 6 January 1943)
- RN Air Section Norfolk, Virginia, (1 February - 4 March 1943)
- Naval Air Station Barbers Point, Hawaii, (4 March - 7 May 1943)

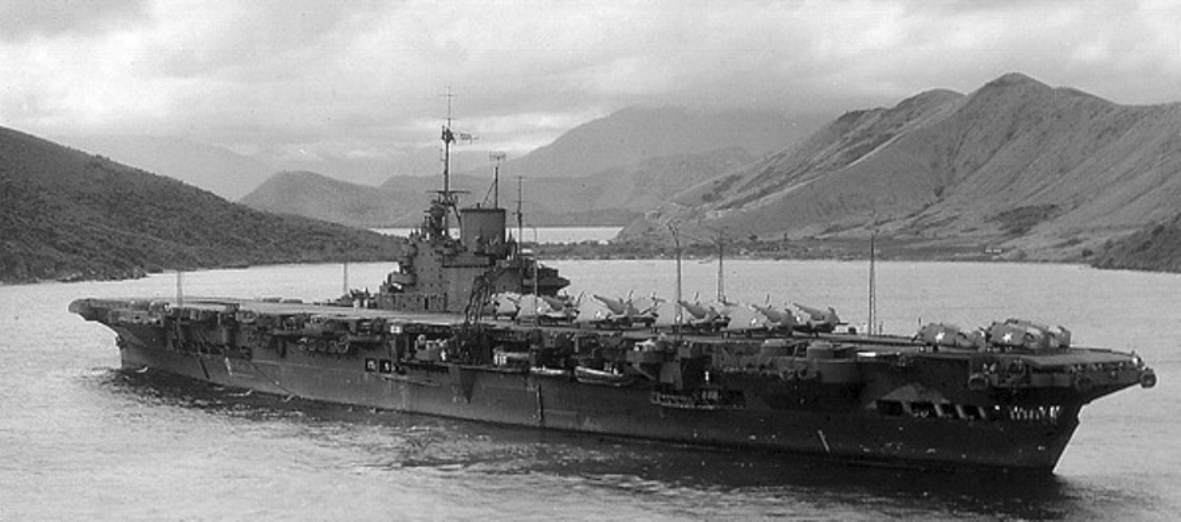
HMS Victorious at Noumea in 1943. during operations with the U.S. Navy Task Force 36 in the Solomons, between May and September 1943

- HMS Victorious (7 May - 3 June 1943)
- Tontouta Air Base, New Caledonia, (3 - 16 June 1943)
- HMS Victorious (16 - 20 June 1943)
- Tontouta Air Base, New Caledonia, (20 - 27 June 1943)
- HMS Victorious (27 June - 25 July 1943)
- Tontouta Air Base, New Caledonia, (25 - 31 July 1943)
- HMS Victorious (31 July - 1 September 1943)
- RN Air Section Norfolk, Virginia, (1 - 2 September 1943)
- Naval Air Station Willow Grove, Pennsylvania, (2 - 11 September 1943)
- RN Air Section Norfolk, Virginia, (11 - 16 September 1943)
- HMS Victorious (16 - 26 September 1943)
- Royal Naval Air Station Eglinton (HMS Gannet), County Londonderry, (26 September - 6 November 1943)
  - Royal Naval Air Station Ayr (HMS Wagtail), South Ayrshire, (Detachment four aircraft 27 October - 6 November 1943)
- HMS Pursuer (26 November 1943 - 6 April 1944)
- Royal Naval Air Station Hatston (HMS Sparrowhawk), Mainland Orkney, (6 - 11 April 1944)
- HMS Pursuer (11 April - 1 May 1944)
- Royal Naval Air Station Burscough (HMS Ringtail), Lancashire, (1 May - 2 June 1944)
- HMS Pursuer (2 - 12 June 1944)
- disbanded - (12 June 1944)

1945

- Royal Naval Air Station Wingfield (HMS Malagas), Cape Town, South Africa, (9 January - 22 April 1945)
- RN Air Section Durban, Durban, South Africa, (22 - 24 April 1945)
- HMS Ameer (24 April - 12 May 1945)
- Royal Naval Air Station Tambaram (HMS Valluru), India, (12 - 30 May 1945)
- Royal Naval Air Station Trincomalee (HMS Bambara), Ceylon, (30 May - 5 June 1945)
- Royal Naval Air Station Tambaram (HMS Valluru), India, (5 - 10 June 1945)
- HMS Empress (10 - 20 June 1945)
  - HMS Emperor DLT (20 - 24 June 1945)
- HMS Ameer (24 June - 16 July 1945)
- Royal Naval Air Station Trincomalee (HMS Bambara), Ceylon, (16 - 17 July 1945)
- HMS Empress (17 - 30 July 1945)
- Royal Naval Air Station Trincomalee (HMS Bambara), Ceylon, (30 July - 24 November 1945)
  - HMS Empress (Detachment eight aircraft 8 - 13 September 1945)
- HMS Empress (crews) 24.11.45
- disbanded - United Kingdom (19 December 1945)

== Commanding officers ==
List of commanding officers of 896 Naval Air Squadron with date of appointment:

1942 - 1944

- Lieutenant(A) S.G. Orr, DSC & Bar, RNVR, from 15 September 1942
- Lieutenant Commander(A) B.H.C. Nation, RN, from 28 March 1943
- Lieutenant Commander(A) L.A. Hordern, DSC, RNVR, from 25 October 1943
- disbanded - 12 June 1944

1945

- Lieutenant Commander(A) R.M. Norris, RNVR, from 9 January 1945 (KiA 7 July 1945)
- Lieutenant Commander(A) G.J. Zegers de Beijl, DSC, RNIN, from 14 July 1945
- Lieutenant Commander(A) M.F. Turner, RNVR, from 12 October 1945
- disbanded - 19 December 1945

Note: Abbreviation (A) signifies Air Branch of the RN or RNVR.
