= Wingfield Aerodrome =

Former airport of Cape Town, South Africa

- IATA: none; ICAO: none

Summary
- Location: Cape Town
- Coordinates: 33°54′24.9″S 18°31′53.46″E

Map
- Location within the Cape Town metropolitan area

Wingfield Aerodrome was first the Cape Town Municipal Aerodrome, then Air Force Station Wingfield under the SAAF, before being used as a Fleet Air Arm base by the Royal Navy. After World War II, the aerodrome reverted to being the municipal airport for a while. The history of Wingfield is synonymous with the history of flight in South Africa, including pioneering attempts at commercial aviation.

== Early landing grounds in the Cape ==
In the early days of aviation, all that was required for take off and landing was a level piece of land relatively free of obstructions. Where a flight commenced and ended depended on the weather, the reason for the flight, the mechanical state of the aircraft and even the whim of the pilot.

Navigation was done by following a road or railway line and referring to prominent landmarks such as Table Mountain.

There were no laws prohibiting low flying or landing within city limits.

Places in the vicinity of Cape Town known to be used as airfields included Kenilworth race course, Green Point Common and Green Point cycle track, Sea Point, Robben Island, Maitland Common, Rosebank Showgrounds and Mr Young's farm near Wynberg as well as local beaches.

It would be several years before the commercial prospects of aviation would be grasped and an aviation infrastructure put in place.

== World War II ==
Following the outbreak of World War II the estate of former Cape Town mayor and businessman, David Pieter de Villiers Graaff, sold the land to the government to aid the war effort on condition that it would revert to his estate when the war was concluded and the government had no further military use for it. This led to the establishment of the Wingfield Aerodrome.

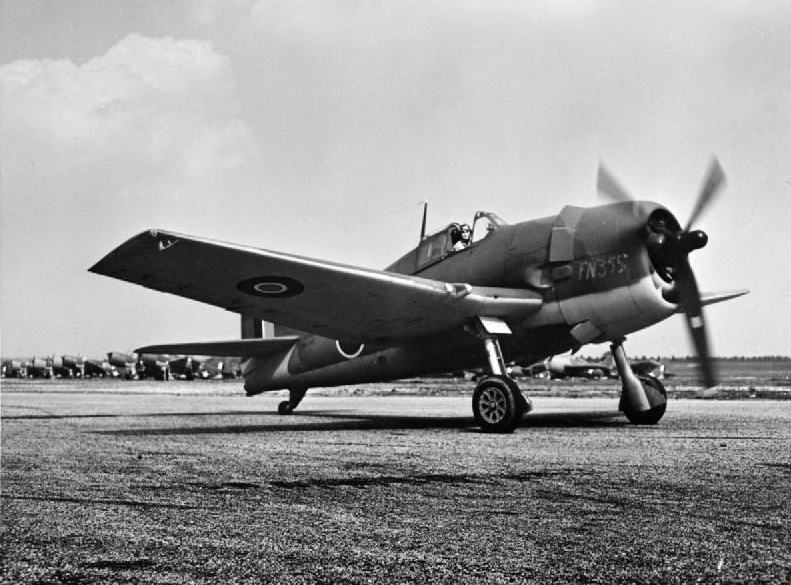
A Fleet Air Arm Hellcat F.I

September 1939 saw the formation of 15 Squadron SAAF at Germiston with three former SAA Junkers Ju 86 airliners used for maritime patrols. After moving to Wingfield the squadron was absorbed as A Flight of 32 Squadron SAAF.

In 1939, Alex Henshaw, Chief Test Pilot for Britain's Spitfire fighter planes, flying a modified Percival Mew Gull registration number G-AEXF, set a number of records for solo flights between Gravesend, Kent (now RAF Gravesend) and Wingfield and back, which still stands today nearly seventy years later.

=== Royal Navy ===
Wingfield was acquired for the Royal Navy and subsequently transferred to Admiralty control from the South African Air Force. It was designated as Royal Naval Air Station Wingfield (RNAS Wingfield) and commissioned as HMS Malagas on 1 July 1942 under the command of Commander J. Friar. During its tenure as HMS Malagas, the airbase supported the Fleet Air Arm by accommodating six disembarked squadrons, as well as squadrons in training, with a capacity for 75 aircraft. It provided facilities for both fighter and torpedo, bomber, reconnaissance (TBR) units, a Fleet Requirements Unit, and a Royal Naval Aircraft Repair Yard, which had a capacity for 150 aircraft.

During this period it had four runways approximately 30 yards (27 m) wide.

Details of runways
Orientation	Length
00/18 (North–South)	1,000 yards (914 m)
02/20 (North East-South West)	1,420 yards (1,298 m)
05/23 (North East-South West)	1,050 yards (960 m)
14/32 (South East–North West)	1,000 yards (914 m).

789 Naval Air Squadron, a Fleet Requirements Unit, was established on 1 July 1942 and operated a variety of aircraft including Avro Anson I, Bristol Beaufighter Mk.IIF, Boulton Paul Defiant TT Mk I, North American Harvard, Vought Kingfisher, Miles Martinet TT.Mk I and Supermarine Walrus, remaining until its disbandment on 25 November 1945. 799 Naval Air Squadron, a pool and aircrew refresher training squadron equipped with Fairey Albacore torpedo bombers, was established on 10 September 1943 and disbanded on 20 June 1944.

On 11 August 1944, 810 Naval Air Squadron with twelve Fairey Barracuda Mk II, together with the fighter squadrons 1830 and 1833 Naval Air Squadrons, with Vought Corsair Mk II, disembarked from HMS Illustrious and remained until 13 October 1944. 818 Naval Air Squadron, equipped with four Fairey Swordfish II aircraft, disembarked from HMS Atheling between 12 and 18 September 1944, while 1838 Naval Air Squadron disembarked from the same carrier on 12 September 1944 with ten Vought Corsair Mk II aircraft but was disbanded the following day, its personnel and aircraft being absorbed into 1830 and 1833 Squadrons.

804 Naval Air Squadron, equipped with twenty-four Grumman Hellcat F. Mk. II fighters, was established on 24 September 1944 and embarked in HMS Ameer in January 1945. 898 Naval Air Squadron was established on 1 January 1945 with twenty-four Grumman Hellcat F. Mk. II aircraft and embarked on HMS Attacker on 23 June 1945, while 896 Naval Air Squadron was formed on 5 January 1945 with the same aircraft type and moved to the Royal Navy Air Section at SAAF Stamford Hill, Durban, on 22 April 1945 to embark on HMS Ameer.

881 Naval Air Squadron, also equipped with Grumman Hellcat F. Mk. II fighters, disembarked from HMS Pursuer on 24 April 1945 before later disbanding. In the post-war period, 827 Naval Air Squadron with eighteen Fairey Barracuda Mk II and 1846 Naval Air Squadron with Vought Corsair Mk II both disembarked from HMS Colossus on 17 January 1946 and remained until 8 April 1946.

HMS Malagas was decommissioned on 31 May 1946 and the airbase was subsequently placed under Care and Maintenance.

== The present ==
The SA Navy is to relocate its sprawling technical training school, SAS Wingfield, along with some depots from a run-down World War II-era site near Goodwood to a purpose built new facility at Simon’s Town.

The move – for which the Navy has already received an initial R40 million – follows a comprehensive multiyear investigation into the rationalisation of the Navy’s training institutions.

The SAS Wingfield Naval Unit continues to exercise its right to the Freedom of Goodwood annually "to enter and march in the town with colours flying, drums beating and bayonets fixed".

== Municipal Aerodrome ==
Cape Town International Airport is now the primary airport serving the city of Cape Town, and is the second busiest airport in South Africa and third busiest in Africa. The airport was opened in 1954 to replace Cape Town's previous airport at Wingfield.

== Goodwood Correctional Centre ==
On 17 October 1997 one of the most modern prisons in South Africa, the Goodwood Correctional Centre, with a capacity of 1692 beds was officially opened. It was built on Wingfield land to the north of the N1 highway. It is aligned to the concept of rehabilitation.

== Acacia Park ==
In 1947 a township called Sassar was erected on a portion of Wingfield Aerodrome for the accommodation of officials of the South African Railways and Harbours. From 1948 it also provided accommodation for civil servants and members of Parliament who annually migrate to Cape Town for the parliamentary session.

On 1 December 1959, after a competition for a new name, the name was changed to Acacia Park on account of the many Port Jackson willow trees growing there. A primary school was built and provision made for sport and other recreational facilities.

At that stage children in the primary school were taught in accordance with the Transvaal syllabus and under the control of the Transvaal Education Department.

Acacia Park is currently one of three Parliamentary villages in Cape Town.
