= Operation Collie =

1945 British attacks on the Nancowry Islands

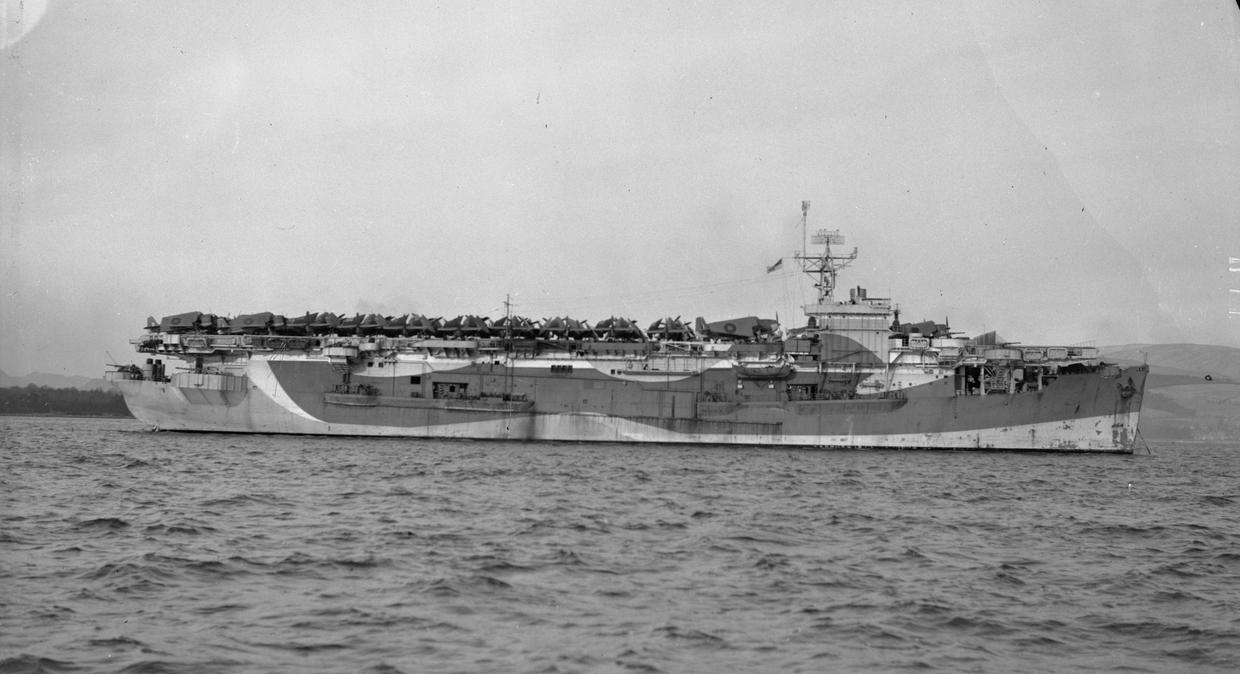
HMS Ameer, one of two aircraft carriers involved in Operation Collie.

Operation Collie was a British naval operation in World War II, from 5–11 July 1945. Its objectives were, firstly, naval bombardment and aerial strikes on Japanese positions in the Nicobar Islands, particularly on Nancowry Island; secondly, providing cover for minesweeping operations in advance of a possible invasion; and thirdly, making carrier raids on Japanese airfields in northern Sumatra. These measures were a prelude for an invasion, Operation Zipper, which was never carried out due to the Surrender of Japan.

== Operational detail ==
Operation Collie was carried out under the direction of Rear Admiral Wilfrid Patterson, by Ruler-class aircraft carriers HMS Ameer and HMS Emperor, light cruiser HMS Nigeria, destroyers HMS Roebuck, HMS Eskimo, and HMS Vigilant, and escort carriers HMS Stalker and HMS Empress, and the 6th Minesweeping Flotilla. The carriers transported Grumman F6F Hellcats of the 884 Naval Air Squadron, which flew 82 sorties. Accounts of casualties vary, but one report indicates that two pilots were killed, one during take-off, one in action; and six aircraft were lost, three to enemy action; while another indicated that seven aircraft were lost from the Ameer, with all pilots rescued. Overall, the mission was a success, with one report noting that "three flotillas of minesweepers cleared 167 mines off the northwest coast of Malaya and from the waters around the Nicobars."
