= SS Mormacland =

SS Mormacland may refer to one of several Type C3 ships built for the United States Maritime Commission on behalf of Moore-McCormack Lines:

- SS Mormacland (1939) (MC hull number 46, Type C3), built by Sun Shipbuilding; delivered to Moore-McCormack in April 1940; acquired by the United States Navy in March 1941 for conversion to escort carrier USS Archer (BAVG-1); transferred to Royal Navy as HMS Archer (D78); converted to merchant aircraft carrier MS Empire Lagan, 1945; returned to U.S. custody in 1946; sold for commercial service in 1948; wrecked and scrapped in 1962
- SS Mormacland (1942) (MC hull number 163, Type C3-S-A2), built at Ingalls Shipbuilding; acquired by the United States Navy for conversion to Bogue-class USS St. George (CVE-17); transferred to the Royal Navy under Lend-Lease; served as HMS Pursuer (D73) of the Royal Navy's Attacker class; returned to U.S. custody in 1946 and scrapped the same year
- SS Mormacland (1945) (MC hull number 2796, Type C3-S-A5), built by Ingalls Shipbuilding; delivered to Moore-McCormack in September 1946; scrapped in 1971
