= 898 Naval Air Squadron =

Inactive flying squadron of the Royal Navy's Fleet Air Arm

- Squadron badge
- Active: 1942–1944; 1945; 1951–1953; 1953–1956; 1956–1959
- Disbanded: 2 May 1959
- Country: United Kingdom
- Branch: Royal Navy
- Type: Single-seat fighter squadron
- Role: Carrier-based fighter squadron
- Part of: Fleet Air Arm
- Home station: See Naval air stations section for full list.
- Mottos: Far and Wide
- Engagements: World War II: Operation Toenails; Operation Cartwheel; Operation Tungsten; Operation Ridge Able; Operation Croquet; Operation Hoops; Suez Crisis: Operation Musketeer
- Battle honours: Atlantic 1944; Norway 1944

Commanders
- Previous Commanders: See Commanding officers for full list.
- Notable commanders: Lieutenant Commander D.G. Parker, DSO, DSC, DFC, RN

Insignia
- Squadron Badge Description: Blue, a sun in splendour gold charged with a flying fish in bend black (1944)
- Identification Markings: 7A+ (Martlet/Wildcat); 3A+ (Hellcat); B9A+ and BOA+ (Hellcat July 1945); 143-149 (Sea Fury); 100-112 to 130-141 (Sea Hawk June 1955); 470-483 (Sea Hawk January 1956)
- Fin Carrier Codes: O:T (Sea Fury); Z to O:Z (Sea Hawk from June 1955); O:B:E (Sea Hawk from January 1956)

Aircraft flown
- Fighter: Grumman Martlet/Wildcat; Grumman Hellcat; Hawker Sea Hawk

898 Naval Air Squadron (898 NAS), also referred to as 898 Squadron, was a Fleet Air Arm (FAA) naval air squadron of the United Kingdom’s Royal Navy (RN). It most recently operated Hawker Sea Hawk at RNAS Brawdy (HMS Goldcrest), in Pembrokeshire, between July 1956 and May 1959.

The squadron, which was last disbanded at HMS Goldcrest, RNAS Brawdy, on 2 May 1959, was initially established as a fighter unit on 15 October 1942. It joined HMS Victorious in February 1943 and participated in operations over the Coral Sea during May and June, providing support for the landings in the Solomon Islands. After its return to the United Kingdom, the squadron became part of the 7th Naval Fighter Wing. In April 1944, it provided fighter cover for an assault on the German battleship Tirpitz and conducted anti-shipping operations off the coast of Norway from May to June 1944, before disbanding into 882 Naval Air Squadron in July 1944. The squadron was re-established as a fighter unit in January 1945; however, it was too late to engage in further operations, leading to its eventual disbandment in December 1945.

In July 1951, 898 Naval Air Squadron was re-established and subsequently engaged in six months of active flight operations in the Mediterranean while attached to HMS Ocean. However, on 1 January 1953, the squadron was merged into 807 Naval Air Squadron after having spent most of its operational time abroad. The squadron was reformed in August 1953 at RNAS Brawdy and later boarded HMS Albion in September for a six-month deployment in the Mediterranean. Following a brief period with HMS Bulwark, the squadron reembarked on HMS Ark Royal in September for another six months in the Mediterranean, disbanding at RNAS Brawdy in April 1956. The squadron was reformed at RNAS Brawdy in July 1956 and joined HMS Ark Royal in January 1957. In June, it transitioned to HMS Bulwark, returned to HMS Ark Royal, and then moved back to HMS Bulwark in November. In May 1958, the squadron joined HMS Eagle for a six-month deployment, with another period aboard in early 1959.

== History ==
=== Single seat fighter squadron (1942-1944) ===
On 17 September 1942, personnel for 898 Naval Air Squadron gathered at RNAS Lee-on-Solent (HMS Daedalus) in Hampshire. They embarked in HMT Queen Mary, setting sail for the United States and arriving at NAS Norfolk, Virginia, where the squadron was officially established as a fighter unit on 15 October, under the command of Royal Marines Captain A.J. Wright. The squadron was equipped with six Grumman Martlet Mk IV, an American carrier-based fighter aircraft. These aircraft were the counterparts to the US Navy's F4F-4B variant and were generally comparable to the Mk II, but featuring two extra wing-mounted guns and powered by a Wright Cyclone engine.

In January 1943, deck landing exercises were conducted on the USS Charger at Brunswick, Maine, after which the squadron joined HMS Victorious on 3 February. This occurred as HMS Victorious embarked on a journey to the Pacific through the Panama Canal to integrate with the United States Pacific Fleet. The USS Hornet was lost, and the USS Enterprise sustained significant damage during the Battle of the Santa Cruz Islands, resulting in the United States Navy (USN) having only one operational fleet carrier, the USS Saratoga, in the Pacific theater. In response to a request for additional carrier support, the Royal Navy aircraft carrier HMS Victorious was loaned to the USN in late December 1942.

A number of months was dedicated to operations in that theater, which encompassed reconnaissance missions in the Coral Sea region during May, succeeded in June by providing assistance for the landings conducted by United States forces in the Middle Solomons. HMS Victorious arrived back in the United Kingdom on 26 September, with the squadron disembarking at RNAS Eglinton (HMS Gannet) in County Down, Northern Ireland. By this time, the unit had been re-equipped with ten Grumman Wildcat Mk V fighter aircraft and was integrated into the 7th Naval Fighter Wing. This version of aircraft was comparable to the FM-1 Wildcat of the United States Navy, manufactured by General Motors and equipped with the Pratt & Whitney R-1830 Twin Wasp engine.

On 12 September, the unit commenced operations aboard HMS Searcher, a Ruler-class escort carrier, to support North Atlantic convoys, primarily utilising RNAS Hatston (HMS Sparrowhawk), Mainland, Orkney, as a base of operations. In April 1944, the 7th Naval Fighter Wing took part in an assault on the German battleship Tirpitz located in Altafjord, Norway. Over the subsequent two months, multiple shipping strikes were executed off the coast of Norway, resulting in the downing of a Focke-Wulf Fw 200 Condor maritime patrol aircraft and four Blohm & Voss BV 138 Seedrache flying boats. In June 1944, the squadron offered protection for a convoy heading to Gibraltar, before being amalgamated into 882 Naval Air Squadron on July 5, 1944.

=== Grumman Hellcat (1945) ===
898 Naval Air Squadron was reformed at RNAS Wingfield (HMS Malagas), in Cape Town, South Africa on 8 January 1945, as a single-seat fighter unit. The squadron was equipped with twenty-four Grumman Hellcat F. Mk. II fighter aircraft. This version was comparable to the F6F-5 Hellcat of the United States Navy and was equipped with the Pratt & Whitney R-2800 Double Wasp engine. In June, it embarked in the escort carrier HMS Attacker for deployment to Ceylon. The aircraft were equipped with rocket projectiles in July; however, the squadron did not engage in any combat prior to V-J Day. Subsequently, the pilots returned home aboard the Attacker-class escort carrier HMS Pursuer, without their aircraft, and the squadron was officially disbanded upon their arrival to the United Kingdom on 12 December.

=== Hawker Sea Fury (1951-1953) ===
898 Naval Air Squadron was reestablished at RNAS Arbroath (HMS Condor), Angus, Scotland, in July 1951. It was equipped with eight Hawker Sea Fury FB.11 fighter-bomber aircraft. The squadron subsequently embarked on the Colossus-class light fleet aircraft carrier, HMS Ocean for a six-month period of rigorous flight operations in the Mediterranean region. In February 1952, the squadron transitioned to Ocean's sister ship HMS Theseus while still in the Mediterranean, followed by a transfer to another sister ship, HMS Glory in July, and a return to HMS Theseus in October. After rejoining HMS Ocean in December, the squadron was merged into 807 Naval Air Squadron on 1 January 1953.

=== Hawker Sea Hawk (1953-1959) ===
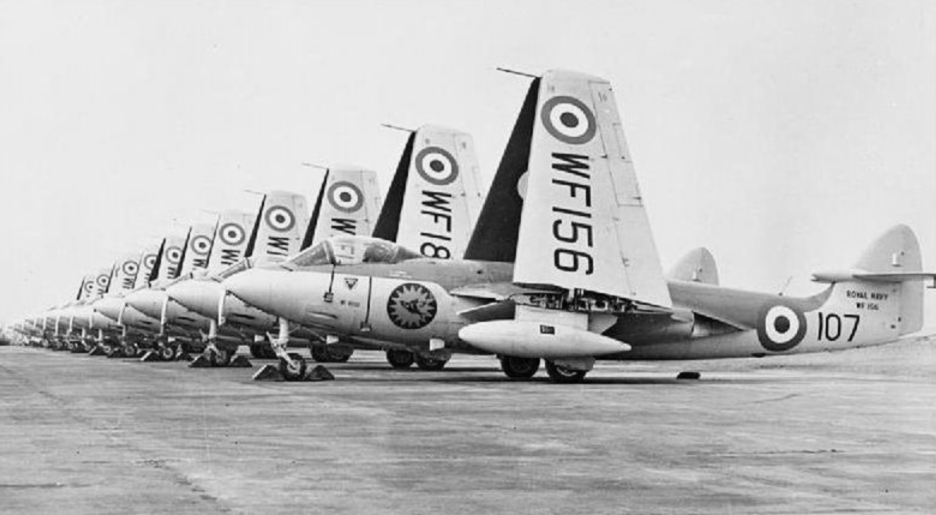
Hawker Sea Hawk F.1 of 898 Squadron at RNAS Brawdy, Pembrokeshire, in 1954.

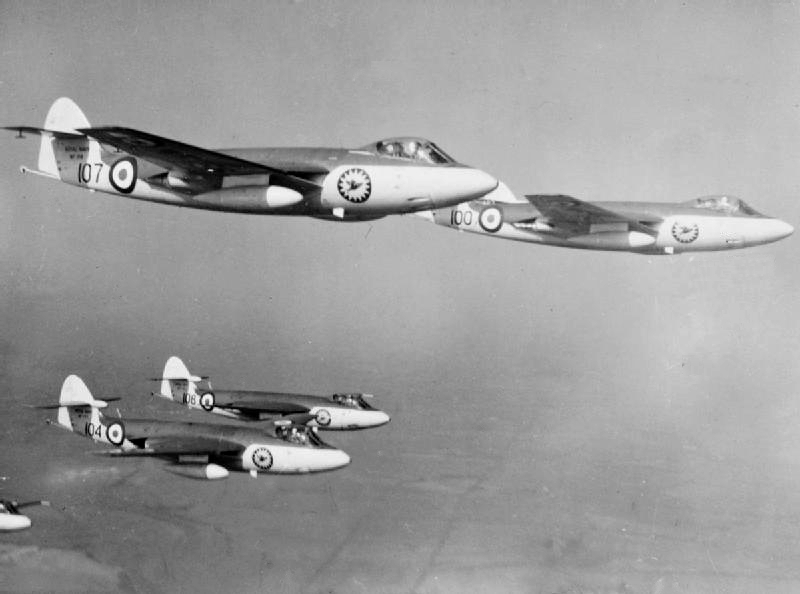
Hawker Sea Hawk F.1 from 898 Squadron

On 24 August 1953, the squadron was reestablished at RNAS Brawdy (HMS Goldcrest) in Pembrokeshire, Wales, initially equipped with twelve Hawker Sea Hawk F.1 jet day fighter aircraft. In July 1954, these were replaced with the FB.3 variant, designed for fighter-bomber operations. 898 Naval Air Squadron remained on land until it boarded the Centaur-class light fleet carrier, HMS Albion in September for a six-month deployment in the Mediterranean. In May 1955, the squadron had a brief deployment with sister ship, HMS Bulwark, during a visit to Oslo, after which it re-equipped with the Fighter/Ground attack variant FGA.6 upon its return. In September, the squadron embarked in the Audacious-class aircraft carrier, HMS Ark Royal for another six-month operation in the Mediterranean, ultimately disbanding at RNAS Brawdy on April 19, 1956.

898 Naval Air Squadron was reformed at RNAS Brawdy on 30 July 1956, initially equipped with twelve Hawker Sea Hawk FGA.4 aircraft. These were gradually substituted with the FGA.6 variant starting in January 1957, during which time the squadron embarked in HMS Ark Royal. In June of the same year, the squadron transitioned to HMS Bulwark, only to return to HMS Ark Royal in September, and then revert back to HMS Bulwark in November. The squadron was assigned to Ark Royal's sister ship HMS Eagle in May 1958 for a six-month deployment in the Mediterranean, followed by another period aboard her in early 1959, before eventually being disbanded at RNAS Brawdy on 2 May.

== Aircraft operated ==
The squadron has operated a number of different aircraft types, including:

- Grumman Martlet Mk IV fighter aircraft (October 1942 - September 1943)
- Grumman Wildcat Mk V fighter aircraft (September 1943 - July 1944)
- Grumman Hellcat F. Mk. II fighter aircraft (January - November 1945)
- Hawker Sea Fury FB.11 fighter-bomber (July 1951 - January 1953)
- Hawker Sea Hawk F1 jet day fighter (August 1953 - August 1954)
- Hawker Sea Hawk FB 3 fighter-bomber (July 1954 - June 1955)
- Hawker Sea Hawk FGA.6 Fighter/Ground attack aircraft (June 1955 - May 1956, January 1957 - April 1959)
- Hawker Sea Hawk FGA.4 Fighter/Ground attack aircraft (November 1955 - February 1956, July 1956 - July 1957)

== Battle honours ==
The battle honours awarded to 898 Naval Air Squadron are:

- Norway 1944
- Atlantic 1944

== Naval air stations and aircraft carriers ==
898 Naval Air Squadron operated from a number of naval air stations of the Royal Navy in the UK and overseas, and also a number of Royal Navy fleet carriers and escort carriers and other airbases overseas:

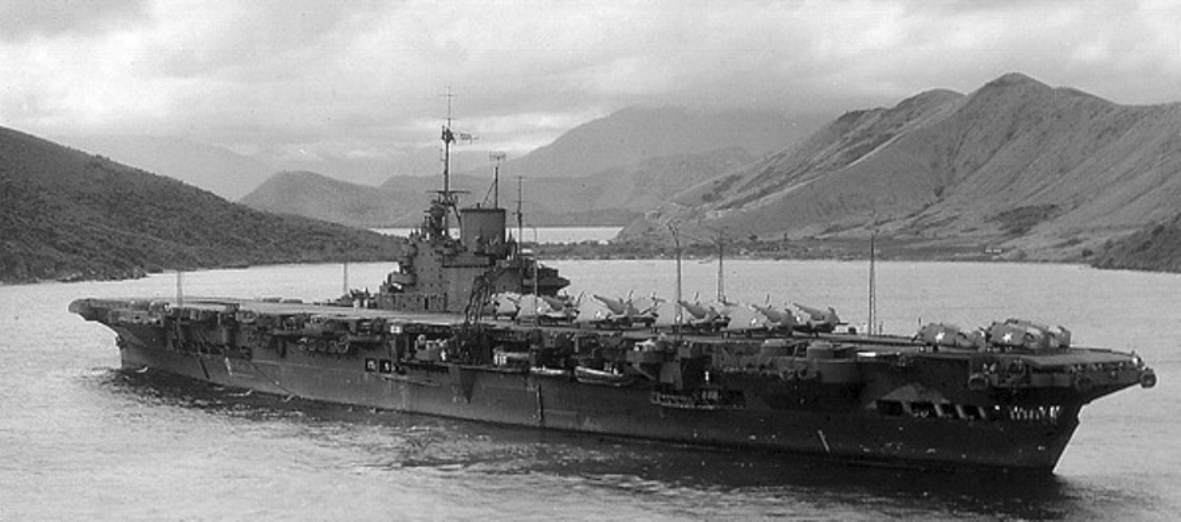
HMS Victorious at Noumea in 1943. during operations with the U.S. Navy Task Force 36 in the Solomons, between May and September 1943

1942 - 1944

- RN Air Section Norfolk (15 October - 4 November 1942)
- Royal Naval Air Station Quonset Point (HMS Asbury) (4 November 1942 - 10 January 1943)
- RN Air Section Brunswick (DLT USS Charger from 10 January 1943)
- Royal Naval Air Station Quonset Point (HMS Asbury) (January - 3 February 1943)
- HMS Victorious (3 February - 4 March 1943)
- Naval Air Station Barbers Point (4 March - 19 April 1943)
- HMS Victorious (19 - 24 April 1943)
- Naval Air Station Barbers Point (24 April - 7 May 1943)
- Ford Island / HMS Victorious (7 May -3 June 1943)
- Tontouta Air Base (3 - 16 June 1943)
- HMS Victorious (16 June - 25 July 1943)
- Tontouta Air Base (25 - 31 July 1943)
- HMS Victorious (31 July - 1 September 1943)
- RN Air Section Norfolk (1 - 2 September 1943)
- Naval Air Station Willow Grove (2 - 11 September 1943)
- RN Air Section Norfolk / HMS Victorious (11 - 26 September 1943)
- Royal Naval Air Station Eglinton (HMS Gannet) (26 September - 9 December 1943)

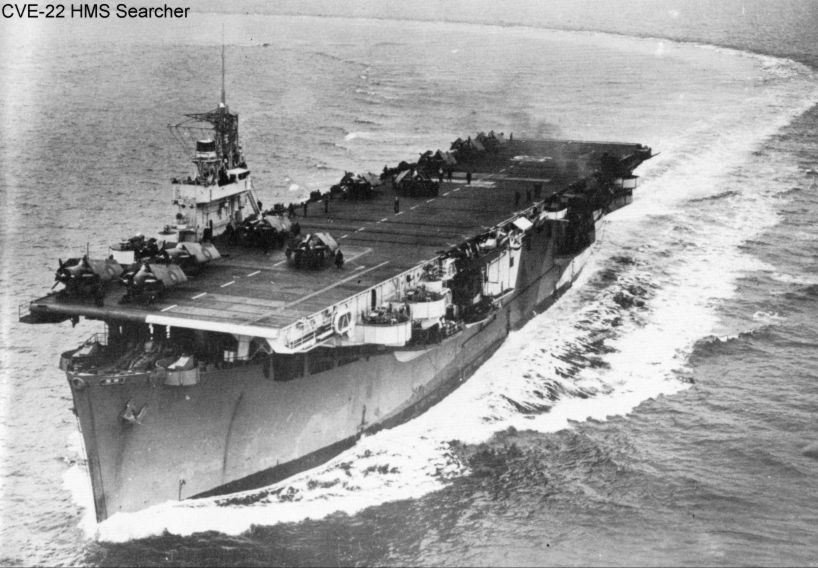
HMS Searcher

- HMS Searcher (9 December 1943 - 4 January 1944)
- RN Air Section Brunswick (4 January - 8 February 1944)
- HMS Searcher (8 - 28 February 1944)
- Royal Naval Air Station Eglinton (HMS Gannet) (28 February - 2 March 1944)
- HMS Searcher (2 March - 7 April 1944)
- Royal Naval Air Station Hatston (HMS Sparrowhawk) (7 - 11 April 1944)
- HMS Fencer (11 - 15 April 1944)
- Royal Naval Air Station Hatston (HMS Sparrowhawk) (15 - 18 April 1944)
- HMS Searcher (18 - 28 April 1944)
- Royal Naval Air Station Hatston (HMS Sparrowhawk) (28 April - 3 May 1944)
- HMS Searcher (3 May - 1 June 1944)
- Royal Naval Air Station Hatston (HMS Sparrowhawk) (1 - 8 June 1944)
- HMS Searcher (8 June - 3 July 1944)
- disbanded - (3 July 1944)

1945

- Royal Naval Air Station Wingfield (HMS Malagas) (8 January - 23 June 1945)
- HMS Attacker (23 June - July 1945)
- Royal Naval Air Station Colombo Racecourse (HMS Berhunda) (July - 19 July 1945)
- Royal Naval Air Station Katukurunda (HMS Ukussa) (19 - 29 July 1945)
- HMS Pursuer (29 July - 1 August 1945)
- Royal Naval Air Station Trincomalee (HMS Bambara) (1 - 6 August 1945)
- HMS Pursuer (6 - 18 August 1945)
- Royal Naval Air Station Puttalam (HMS Rajaliya) (18 August - 14 September 1945)
- Royal Naval Air Station Katukurunda (HMS Ukussa) (14 September - 20 November 1945)
- HMS Pursuer (personnel) (20 November - 12 December 1945
- disbanded - United Kingdom (12 December 1945)

1951 - 1953

- Royal Naval Air Station Arbroath (HMS Condor) (4 - 24 July 1951)

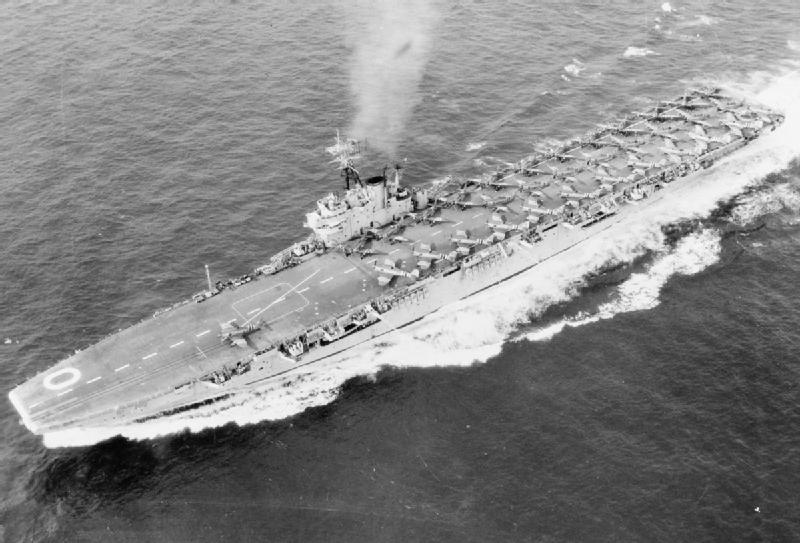
HMS Ocean with Hawker Sea Fury on deck

- HMS Ocean (24 July - 3 August 1951)
- Royal Naval Air Station Hal Far (HMS Falcon) (3 August - 12 September 1951)
- HMS Ocean (12 September - 17 October 1951)
- Royal Naval Air Station Hal Far (HMS Falcon) (17 October - 12 November 1951)
- HMS Ocean (12 November 1951 - 26 February 1952)
- HMS Theseus (26 February - 9 April 1952)
- Royal Naval Air Station Hal Far (HMS Falcon) (9 - 21 April 1952)
- HMS Theseus (21 - 30 April 1952)
- Royal Naval Air Station Hal Far (HMS Falcon) (30 April - 23 June 1952)
- Royal Air Force Kasfareet (23 June - 6 July 1952)
- HMS Glory (6 - 8 July 1952)
- Royal Naval Air Station Hal Far (HMS Falcon) (8 - 21 July 1952)
- HMS Glory (21 July - 15 August 1952)
- Royal Naval Air Station Hal Far (HMS Falcon) (15 August - 15 October 1952)
- HMS Theseus (15 October - 12 November 1952)
- Royal Naval Air Station Hal Far (HMS Falcon) (12 November - 8 December 1952)
  - HMS Ocean (Detachment 28 November - 8 December 1952)
- HMS Ocean (8 December 1952 - 1 January 1953)
- disbanded - (1 January 1953)

1953 - 1956

- Royal Naval Air Station Brawdy (HMS Goldcrest) (24 August - 19 September 1953)
- HMS Albion (19 September - 13 December 1954)
- Royal Naval Air Station Hal Far (HMS Falcon) (13 December 1954 - 12 January 1955)
- HMS Albion (12 January - 31 March 1955)
  - Royal Naval Air Station Hal Far (HMS Falcon) (Detachment four aircraft 4 - 14 February 1955)
- Royal Naval Air Station Stretton (HMS Blackcap) (31 March - 23 May 1955)
- HMS Bulwark (23 May - 4 June 1955)
- Royal Naval Air Station Stretton (HMS Blackcap) (4 June - 28 September 1955)

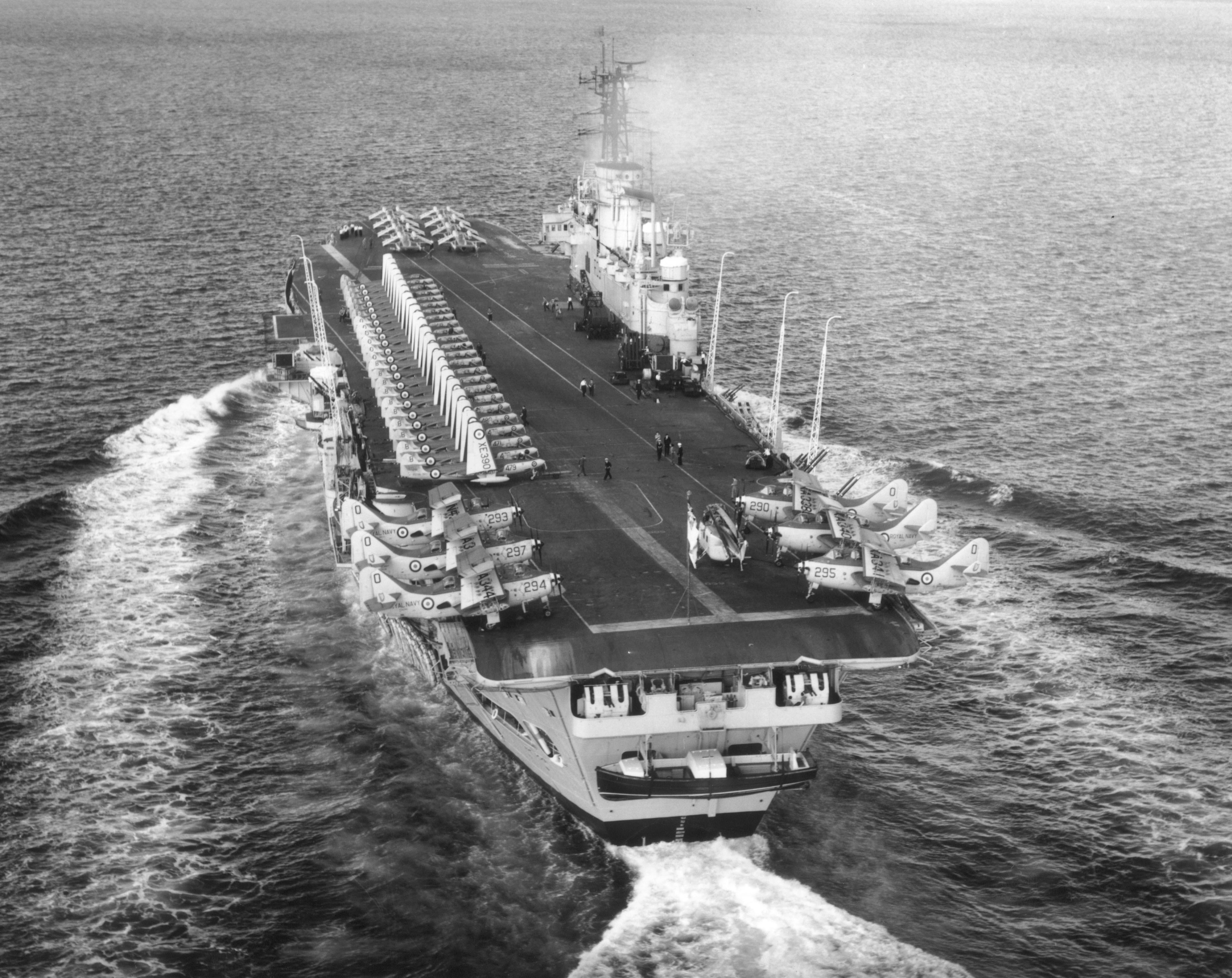
HMS Ark Royal during the 1950s

- HMS Ark Royal (28 September 1955 - 6 March 1956)
- Royal Naval Air Station Brawdy (HMS Goldcrest) (6 March - 19 April 1956)
- disbanded - (19 April 1956)

1956 - 1959

- Royal Naval Air Station Brawdy (HMS Goldcrest) (30 July 1956 - 9 January 1957)
- HMS Ark Royal (9 January - 25 February 1957)
- Royal Naval Air Station Brawdy (HMS Goldcrest) (25 February - 6 May 1957)
- HMS Ark Royal (6 May - 28 June 1957)
- HMS Bulwark (28 June - 4 August 1957)
- Royal Naval Air Station Brawdy (HMS Goldcrest) (4 August - 5 September 1957)
- HMS Ark Royal (5 September - 1 November 1957)
- HMS Bulwark (1 - 27 November 1957
- Royal Naval Air Station Brawdy (HMS Goldcrest) (27 November 1957 - 20 May 1958)
- HMS Eagle (20 May - 2 December 1958)
- Royal Naval Air Station Brawdy (HMS Goldcrest) (2 December 1958 - 14 January 1959)
- HMS Eagle (14 January - 29 April 1959)
  - RN Air Section Gibraltar (Detachment three aircraft 2 - 13 March 1959)
- Royal Naval Air Station Brawdy (HMS Goldcrest) (29 April - 2 May 1959)
- disbanded - (2 May 1959)

== Commanding officers ==
List of commanding officers of 898 Naval Air Squadron with date of appointment:

1942 - 1944

- Captain A.J. Wright, RM, from 15 October 1942
- Lieutenant Commander(A) I.L.F. Lowe, DSC, RN, from 24 November 1942
- Lieutenant Commander(A) G.R. Henderson, DSC, RNVR, from 20 October 1943
- disbanded - 3 July 1944

1945

- Lieutenant Commander(A) R.W. Kearsley, RN, from 1 January 1945
- disbanded - 12 December 1945

1951 - 1956

- Lieutenant Commander T.L.M. Brander, DSC, RN, from 4 July 1951
- disbanded - 1 January 1953
- Lieutenant Commander D.G. Parker, DSO, DSC, DFC, RN, from 24 August 1953
- Lieutenant Commander W.I. Campbell, RN, from 12 July 1954
- Lieutenant Commander J.H.S. Pearce, DSC, RN, from 29 August 1955
- disbanded - 19 April 1956

1956 - 1959

- Lieutenant Commander D.B. Morison, RN, from 30 July 1956
- Lieutenant Commander P.L. Keighly-Peach, DSO, RN, from 5 November 1957
- Lieutenant Commander W.H. Cowling, RN, from 2 December 1957
- disbanded - 2 May 1959

Note: Abbreviation (A) signifies Air Branch of the RN or RNVR.

== See also ==
- Exercise Strikeback
