= 881 Naval Air Squadron =

Defunct flying squadron of the Royal Navy's Fleet Air Arm and Royal Canadian Navy

881 Naval Air Squadron VS 881
- VS 881 badge (top) and 881 NAS badge (bottom)
- Active: Royal Navy; 1 June 1941 – 27 October 1945; Royal Canadian Navy; 1 May 1951 - 7 July 1959
- Country: United Kingdom; Canada
- Branch: Royal Navy; Royal Canadian Navy
- Type: Single-seat fighter squadron
- Role: Carrier-based fighter squadron
- Part of: Fleet Air Arm
- Motto(s): Ense constantor alato (Latin for 'Steadfastly with winged sword')
- Aircraft: See Aircraft operated section for full list.
- Battle honours: Diego Suarez 1942; Norway 1943-44; Atlantic 1944; Normandy 1944; South France 1944; Aegean 1944

Insignia
- Squadron Badge Description (RN): Blue, a base water barry wavy of four white and blue a sword in pale white winged gold (1944)
- Squadron Badge Description (RCN): Blue, in base two barulets wavy white over all a sword in pale point downwards of the second, pommel and hilt gold enfiling a coronet of Canada of the last and issuing in the base from behind the sword blade wings conjoined white (1955)

881 Naval Air Squadron (881 NAS) was a Fleet Air Arm (FAA) naval air squadron of the United Kingdom’s Royal Navy (RN), formed in June 1941. It served as a fighter squadron in the Second World War, taking part in the British invasion of Madagascar in 1942, in the Allied invasions of Northern France and Southern France in 1944, also taking part in operations in the Aegean Sea and off Norway before disbanding in October 1945.

The squadron was reformed within the Royal Canadian Navy (RCN) as a carrier-based anti-submarine warfare squadron, when 826 Squadron RCN was renumbered 881 Squadron RCN in May 1951. It was later re designated VS 881 (Note: Canadian naval squadron designations are correctly written with a space rather than a hyphen, unlike the otherwise similar US Navy designations.) in 1952 and subsequently disbanded in 1959 when it was merged with VS 880.

== Royal Navy ==
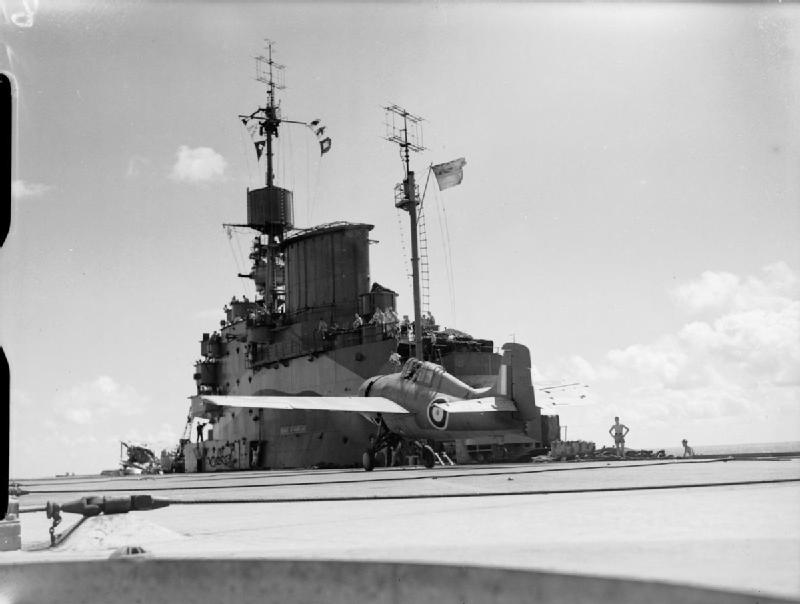
A Martlet of 881 Squadron aboard HMS Illustrious in 1942

881 Naval Air Squadron was first formed at RNAS Lee-on-Solent on 1 June 1941 as a fleet fighter squadron equipped with six Grumman Martlet I and IIs. (Note: The Martlet was the British name for the American Grumman F4F Wildcat fighter. The Fleet Air Arm adopted the name Wildcat in January 1944.) The squadron was intended to deploy aboard the aircraft carrier Ark Royal, but Ark Royal was sunk before the squadron could embark, and 880 Squadron was instead allocated to Illustrious. In March 1942, its strength now increased to nine aircraft, the squadron first embarked aboard Illustrious as the carrier set out for the Indian Ocean. In May 1942, the squadron took part in the invasion of Madagascar, providing fighter cover and carrying out during the initial attacks on Diego Suarez, shooting down two Potez 63-11 reconnaissance bombers on 6 May and three Morane-Saulnier MS 406 fighters on 7 May (for the loss of one Martlet) in the only air-to-air combats of the campaign. On 19 May 1942, 882 Naval Air Squadron, the other Martlet-equipped squadron aboard Illustrious, merged with 881 Squadron. While the important port of Diego Suarez and environs were captured in May, the rest of Madagascar remained under Vichy French control, and on 10 September 1942, an offensive to take the rest of the island, with an amphibious landing at Majunga. Illustrious' air wing, including 881 Squadron, covered the landings at Majunga on 10 September and Tamatave on 17 September.

881 Squadron disembarked from Illustrious when the carrier returned to British waters in February 1943. The squadron embarked on the carrier Furious in July 1943 as the carrier took part in Home Fleet sweeps off the coast of Norway to distract German attention from the Allied invasion of Sicily. The squadron claimed one German reconnaissance aircraft shot down during these operations. The squadron re-equipped with Wildcat V fighters in August 1943 and embarked on the Escort carrier Pursuer in November as the carrier worked up. In February Pursuer escorted convoys between Britain and Gibraltar, shooting down two German aircraft. On 3 April 1944, 881 Squadron took part in Operation Tungsten, a carrier strike against the German battleship Tirpitz at Kaafjord in the far north of Norway. 881 Squadron's Wildcats, together with those of 882, 896 and 898 Squadrons, the Hellcats of 800 and 804 Squadrons and the Corsairs of 1834 and 1836 Squadrons, escorted the strike against Tirpitz. Later that month, Pursuer, with 881 Squadron aboard, took parts in raids against shipping off the coast of Norway.

In June 1944, Pursuer, with an airwing of 881 and 896 Squadrons, was deployed as part of the forces patrolling to protect the invasion forces during the Invasion of Normandy. The squadron then deployed aboard the escort carrier Fencer for Operation Wanderer, an anti-submarine sweep off the coast of Norway designed to make the Germans believe that an invasion of Norway was immanent, to discourage them from withdrawing troops to Normandy. In July, the squadron re-embarked on Pursuer which departed for the Mediterranean, taking part in Operation Dragoon, the Allied invasion of Southern France, in August 1944. The squadron's Wildcats were used for reconnaissance and artillery spotting, as well as for dive bombing and combat air patrol duties during the invasion. The squadron flew 180 sorties over Southern France, with three Wildcats being lost as a result of enemy fire, two due to running out of fuel and two as a result of landing accidents. In September that year, Pursuer took part in Operation Outing, an offensive by the Royal Navy against German forces in the Aegean Sea. 881 Squadron carried out attack and reconnaissance missions, sinking a number of Caïques.

Pursuer returned to Britain in October with 881 Squadron, and in November, 881 Squadron, operating from Pursuer, took part in a number of operations against German shipping in Norwegian waters, sinking the German Vorpostenboot (patrol boat) V6413 off Trondheim on 14 November and escorting Grumman Avengers from the carrier Premier on a mine-laying mission on 20 November. From December 1944 to January 1945, detachments of the squadron operated from the carriers Premier and Trumpeter, taking part in Operation Urbane, another carrier operation off Norway, in December, where they escorted minelaying and anti-shipping missions. Operations off Norway continued through January and February.

In March 1945, the squadron took passage on Pursuer to Cape Town, arriving in April. where it replaced its Wildcats with Grumman Hellcat fighters in preparation for joining the British Pacific Fleet. The end of the year interrupted the squadron's work-up with its new aircraft, and it was disbanded on 27 October 1945.

== Canada ==
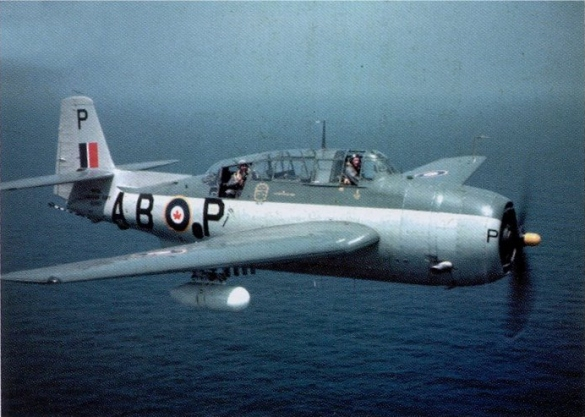
Grumman Avenger AS3, 881 Anti-Submarine Squadron, HMCS Magnificent, Royal Canadian Navy, 1950-1952

The squadron was re-formed as an anti-submarine squadron of the Royal Canadian Navy on 1 May 1951, when, as part of a renumbering of Commonwealth Naval Air Squadrons, 826 Squadron was renumbered 881 Squadron. The squadron, equipped with Grumman TBM-3E Avengers, had a shore base of HCMS Shearwater, a Canadian Naval airbase at Dartmouth, Nova Scotia, and regularly deployed aboard the Canadian aircraft carrier Magnificent. In November 1952, the squadron adopted the US Navy-like styling of VS 881 for its designation. In March 1955, a flight of four Avengers equipped for Airborne Early Warning was added, but in practice, the AEW Avengers were used to locate surface targets for the squadron's regular anti-submarine aircraft. The squadron re-equipped with Grumman CS2F-1 Trackers in February–March 1957, starting operations on Canada's new carrier, Bonaventure, later that year. On 7 July 1959, VS 881 was disbanded when it was merged with VS 880, with the combined unit operating under the VS 880 designation.

== Aircraft operated ==
The squadron has operated a number of different aircraft types when under the command of the Royal Navy, then subsequently the Royal Canadian Navy, including:

=== Royal Navy ===
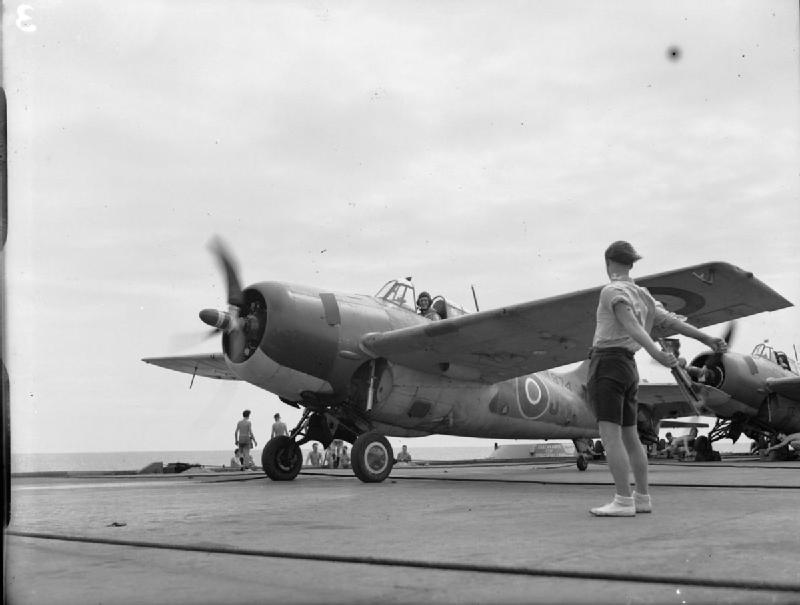
Grumman Wildcat of 881 Naval Air Squadron cleared to take off from HMS Illustrious

- Grumman Martlet Mk I fighter aircraft (June - December 1941)
- Grumman Martlet Mk II fighter aircraft (June 1941 - August 1943)
- Grumman Martlet Mk IV fighter aircraft (June 1942 - August 1943)
- Grumman Wildcat Mk V fighter aircraft (August 1943 - June 1944)
- Grumman Wildcat Mk VI fighter aircraft (June 1944 - March 1945)
- Grumman Hellcat F. Mk. II fighter aircraft (May - September 1945)

=== Royal Canadian Navy ===
- Grumman Avenger AS3 anti-submarine aircraft (May 1951 - March 1957)
- Grumman Avenger Mk.3W2 airborne early warning and control (AEW&C) and relay platform (March 1955 - March 1957)
- de Havilland Canada (Grumman) CS2F Tracker CS2F-1 anti-submarine warfare aircraft (February 1957 - July 1959)

== Battle honours ==
The following Battle Honours have been awarded to 881 Naval Air Squadron.

- Atlantic 1939–45
- Norway 1940–5
- Diego Suarez 1942
- Aegean 1943–4
- Normandy 1944
- South France 1944

== Commanding officers ==
=== Royal Navy ===
List of commanding officers of 881 Naval Air Squadron.

- Lieutenant Commander J.C. Cockburn, RN, from 1 June 1941
- Lieutenant O.N. Bailey, RN, from 10 April 1942
- Lieutenant Commander R.A. Bird, RN, from 1 March 1943
- Lieutenant Commander D.R.B. Cosh, RCNVR, from 27 November 1943 (Killed in flight accident 24 June 1944)
- Lieutenant Commander(A) L.A. Hordern, DSC, RNVR, from 25 June 1944
- Lieutenant Commander(A) C. Ballard, RNVR, from 23 October 1944
- Lieutenant(A) A.N. Pym, RNVR, from 15 February 1945
- Lieutenant Commander(A) C. Ballard, RNVR, from 17 May 1945
- disbanded - 27 October 1945

Note: Abbreviation (A) signifies Air Branch of the RN or RNVR.

=== Royal Canadian Navy ===
List of commanding officers of 881 Squadron RCN, VS 881:

- Lieutenant-commander J.N. Donaldson, RCN, from 1 May 1951
- Lieutenant-commander W.H.I. Atkinson, DSC, RCN, from 4 March 1953
- Lieutenant-commander M.H.E. Page, RCN, from 13 August 1953
- Lieutenant-commander R.W.J. Cocks, RCN, from 30 August 1954
- Lieutenant-commander N.J. Geary, CD, RCN, from 26 May 1955
- Lieutenant-commander V.M. Langman, DSC, RCN, from 10 June 1956
- Lieutenant-commander H.J.C. Bird, CD, RCN, from 27 November 1956
- Commander W.H. Fearon, CD, RCN, from 6 April 1959
- absorbed into VS 880 - 7 July 1959

== Sources ==
- Ballance, Theo; Howard, Lee; Sturtivant, Ray (2016). The Squadrons and Units of the Fleet Air Arm. Air Britain Historians Limited. ISBN 978-0-85130-489-2.
- Hobbs, David (2013). British Aircraft Carriers: Design, Development and Service Histories. Barnsley, UK: Seaforth Publishing. ISBN 978-1-84832-138-0.
- Konstam, Angus (2018). Sink The Tirpitz 1942–44: The RAF and Fleet Air Arm duel with Germany's mighty battleship. Osprey Publishing. ISBN 9781472831576.
- Rohwer, Jürgen; Hümmelchen, Gerhard (1992). Chronology of the War At Sea 1939–1945. London: Greenhill Books. ISBN 1-85367-117-7.
- Shores, Christopher (1996). Dust Clouds in the Middle East: The Air War for East Africa, Iraq, Syria, Iran and Madagascar, 1940–42. London: Grub Street. ISBN 1-898697-37-X.
- Shores, Christopher; Massimello, Giovanni; Guest, Russell; Olynyk, Frank; Bock, Winfried; Thomas, Andy (2021). A History of the Mediterranean Air War 1940–1945: Volume Five: From the Fall of Rome to the End of the War 1944 – 1945. London: Grub Street. ISBN 978-1-911621-97-3.
- Stitt, Robert M. (January–February 1996). "Willing Tracker: The Grumman S2F Tracker in Canadian Service: Part One". Air Enthusiast. No. 61. pp. 40–51. ISSN 0143-5450.
- Sturtivant, Ray; Ballance, Theo (1994). The Squadrons of the Fleet Air Arm. Tonbridge, Kent, UK: Air Britain (Historians) Ltd. ISBN 0-85130-223-8.
- Thetford, Owen (1978). British Naval Aircraft since 1912 (4th ed.). London: Putnam. ISBN 0-370-30021-1.
- Wragg, David (2019). The Fleet Air Arm Handbook 1939-1945. Cheltenham, Gloucestershire, UK: The History Press. ISBN 978-0-7509-9303-6.
