= HMS Emperor =

Two ships of the Royal Navy have borne the name HMS Emperor. A third was planned, but never entered service:

- HMS Emperor (1856) was a steam yacht purchased in 1856 and commissioned in 1857. She was given in 1858, becoming the Japanese Banryū.
- HMS Emperor was to have been an escort carrier. She was laid down for the Royal Navy in 1942, but was taken over and launched in 1943 as USS Nassuk Bay, and later renamed USS Solomons.
- HMS Emperor (D98) was an Ameer-class escort carrier, originally built as the Bogue-class escort carrier USS Pybus. She was launched in 1942, transferred to the Royal Navy under lend-lease in 1943 and returned to the US Navy in 1946.

== See also ==
- HMS Emperor of India
