= 882 Naval Air Squadron =

Inactive flying squadron of the Royal Navy's Fleet Air Arm

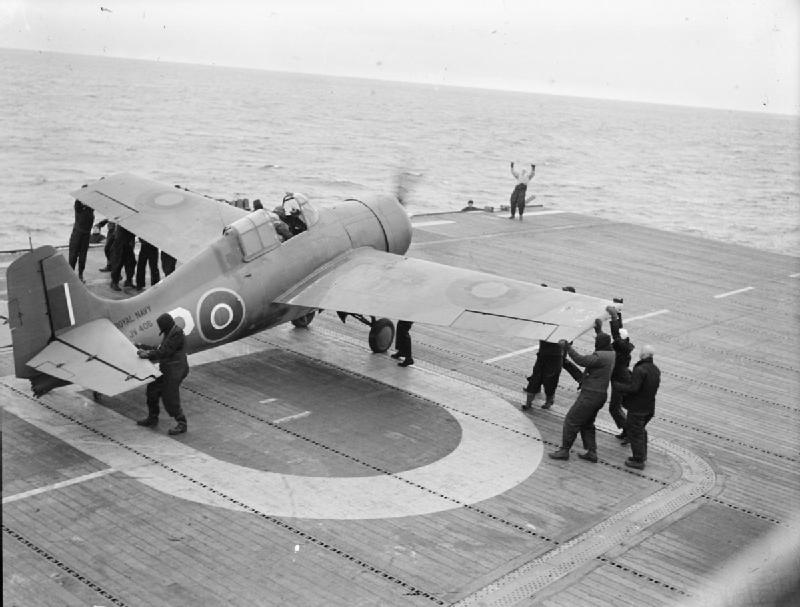
- Grumman Wildcat of 882 NAS positioned for take-off from HMS Pursuer
- Active: 1941–1942; 1942–1945
- Disbanded: 9 October 1945
- Country: United Kingdom
- Branch: Royal Navy
- Type: Single-seat fighter squadron
- Role: Fleet fighter squadron
- Part of: Fleet Air Arm
- Home station: See Naval air stations section for full list.
- Engagements: World War II: Operation Ironclad; Operation Torch; Operation Tungsten; Operation Judgement; Operation Dragoon
- Battle honours: Diego Suarez 1942; North Africa 1942; Atlantic 1943–44; South of France 1944; Norway 1944–45; Arctic 1945

Insignia
- Identification Markings: individual letters Martlet/Wildcat; 6A+ (HMS Victorious, February 1943); S:A+ (HMS Searcher, March 1945); B1A+ (August 1945)

Aircraft flown
- Fighter: Hawker Sea Hurricane; Grumman Martlet; Grumman Wildcat

882 Naval Air Squadron (882 NAS), also referred to as 882 Squadron, is an inactive Fleet Air Arm (FAA) naval air squadron of the United Kingdom's Royal Navy (RN). It was formed as a carrier based fighter squadron in July 1941 and served through the rest of the Second World War, operating with Hawker Sea Hurricane, Grumman Martlet and Grumman Wildcat fighter aircraft.

It took part in the British invasion of Madagascar and Operation Torch, the Anglo-American invasion of North Africa in 1942, and in the invasion of Southern France in August 1945, also taking part in operations in the Aegean and off Norway. It was disbanded after the end of the war, in October 1945.

== Service ==
881 Naval Air Squadron was first formed on 15 July 1941 at RNAS Donibristle in Fife, Scotland as a carrier fighter squadron. Initial equipment was a mixture of Grumman Martlets (Note: The Martlet was the British name for the American Grumman F4F Wildcat fighter. The Fleet Air Arm adopted the name Wildcat in January 1944.) and Hawker Sea Hurricanes, although it settled on the Martlet before it embarked on its first carrier, Illustrious, in March 1942. While a detachment of two aircraft joined the escort carrier Archer in April that year, the rest of the squadron remained with Illustrious as the fleet carrier took part in the invasion of Madagascar in May 1942. The squadron's Martlets, together with those of 881 Squadron, carried out fighter patrols and ground attack missions during the initial attacks on Diego Suarez from 5 to 7 May. 882 Squadron was merged into 881 Squadron on 19 May, although the former 882 Squadron operated as a semi-independent unit at first. The detachment aboard Archer continued to operate after the main part of the squadron disbanded, disembarking from Archer at New York in July and disbanding at Floyd Bennett Field, Brooklyn on 30 September.

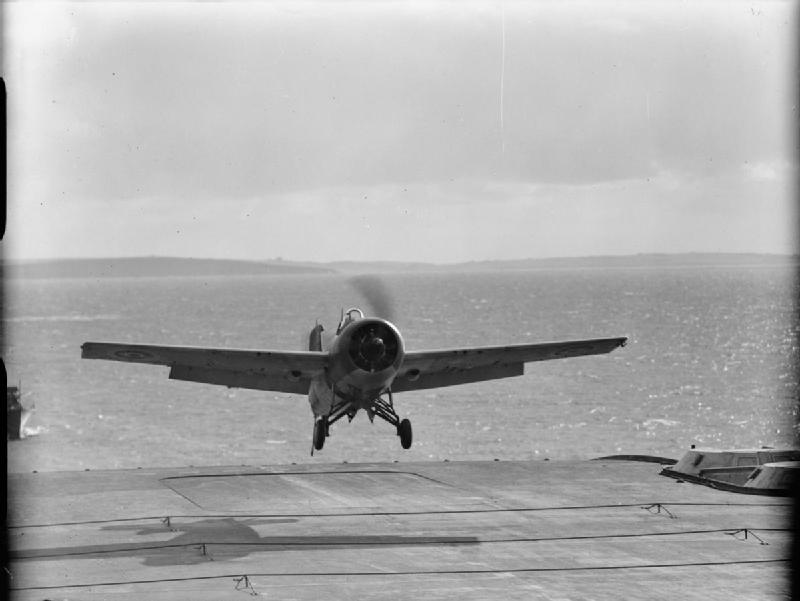
An 882 Naval Air Squadron Martlet landing on Victorious

The squadron reformed at Donibristle on 7 September 1942, from a core of personnel from "A" Flight of 806 Squadron, embarking on the carrier Victorious in October that year to take part in Operation Torch, the Anglo-American invasion of North Africa. On the morning of 8 November, the first day of the landings, four of the squadron's Martlets strafed Blida Airfield, claiming two Vichy French aircraft, a Douglas DB-7 bomber and a Potez 540 transport destroyed on the ground, while later that morning, when a second flight of four 882 Squadron Martlets patrolled over Blida, White flags were seen being waved, and one of the Martlets landed and took the surrender of the airfield, waiting there until a group of Commandos arrived to take possession of the airfield. On 9 November, two of the squadron's Martlets shot down a German Heinkel He 111 bomber, while a German Junkers Ju 88 bomber was damaged by two more Martlets. 882 Squadron remained aboard Victorious when the carrier was deployed to the Pacific to work with the US Fleet in May–July 1943, supplementing its Martlets with a few US Navy Wildcats during the deployment.

The squadron disembarked from Victorious in September 1943, joining the escort carrier Searcher in December that year alongside 898 Squadron, also equipped with Martlets. In March 1944, Searcher joined the British Home Fleet and on 3 April 1944, took part in Operation Tungsten, a carrier strike against the German battleship Tirpitz at Kaafjord in the far north of Norway. 882 Squadron provided close escort to the attacking Fairey Barracuda dive bombers, and strafed Tirpitz to suppress anti-aircraft fire before the Barracudas bombed. Searcher carried out further operations off Norway through the rest of April and into May, and was then used to escort convoys to Gibraltar. On 5 July 1944, 882 Squadron absorbed 898 Squadron, which was disbanded, with the strength of 882 Squadron increasing to 24 Wildcats.

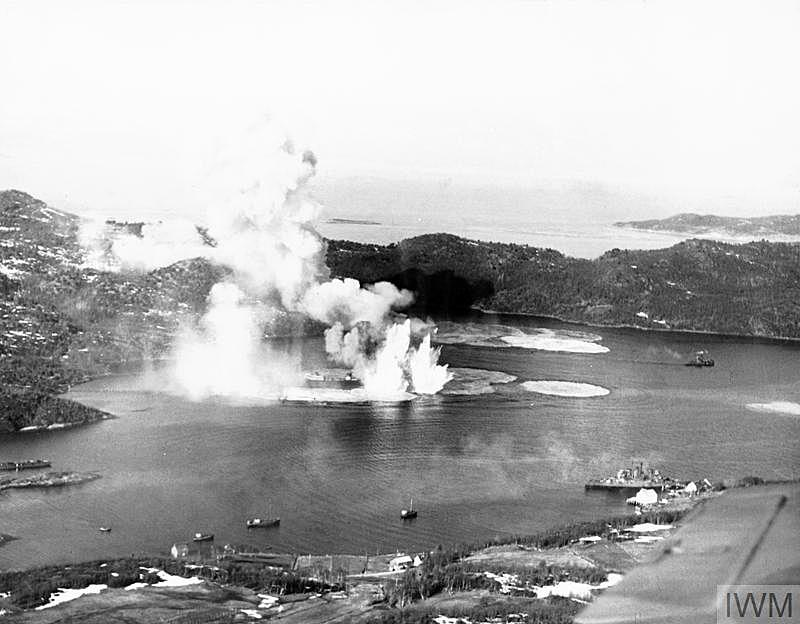
Operation Judgement, 4 May 1945, an attack on the U-boat base at Kilbotn, near Harstad, Norway

On 15 July 1944, Searcher left for the Mediterranean with 882 Squadron aboard, and from 15 August took part in Operation Dragoon, the Allied invasion of Southern France. 882's Wildcats flew 167 sorties during Dragoon, with three aircraft missing and one ditched due to engine failure. In September that year, Searcher took part in Operation Outing, an offensive by the Royal Navy against German forces in the Aegean Sea, with 882 Squadron flying Combat Air Patrol over the allied fleet, as well as armed reconnaissance missions over Crete and bombing a German radar station. Searcher returned to British waters in October, with 882 Squadron disembarking for training and re-equipment with Wildcat VI aircraft at RNAS Ballyhalbert and RAF Long Kesh, Northern Ireland while Searcher was refitted at a shipyard on the River Clyde. The squadron returned to Searcher in February 1945, and continued to be employed in operations off Norway, taking part in Operation Judgement, a strike by aircraft from Searcher, HMS Trumpeter and Queen attacked a German U-boat base at Kilbotn, Norway on 4 May 1945, the last combat operation by the Home Fleet.

The squadron left for the Far East in June 1945 aboard Searcher, but had only reached Ceylon when the war against Japan ended on 15 August. The squadron disbanded when Searcher arrived back at Britain on 9 October 1945.

== Aircraft operated ==
The squadron has operated a number of different aircraft types, including:

- Hawker Sea Hurricane Mk IB fighter aircraft (July 1941 - July 1942)
- Grumman Martlet Mk I fighter aircraft (July 1941 - September 1942)
- Grumman Martlet Mk II fighter aircraft (April - December 1942)
- Grumman Martlet Mk IV fighter aircraft (September 1942 - July 1943)
- Grumman Wildcat F4F-4 fighter aircraft (June - July 1943)
- Grumman Wildcat Mk V fighter aircraft (September 1943 - January 1945)
- Grumman Wildcat Mk VI fighter aircraft (January - September 1945)

== Battle honours ==
The following Battle Honours have been awarded to 882 Naval Air Squadron.

- Diego Suarez 1942
- North Africa 1942
- Atlantic 1943–44
- South of France 1944
- Norway 1944–45
- Arctic 1945

== Naval air stations and aircraft carriers ==
882 Naval Air Squadron operated from a number of naval air stations of the Royal Navy, and Royal Air Force stations in the UK and overseas, and also a number of Royal Navy fleet carriers and escort carriers and other airbases overseas:

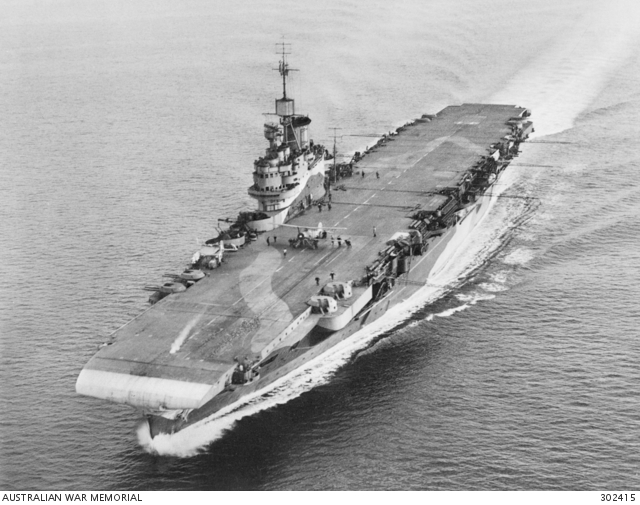
HMS Illustrious ~1942

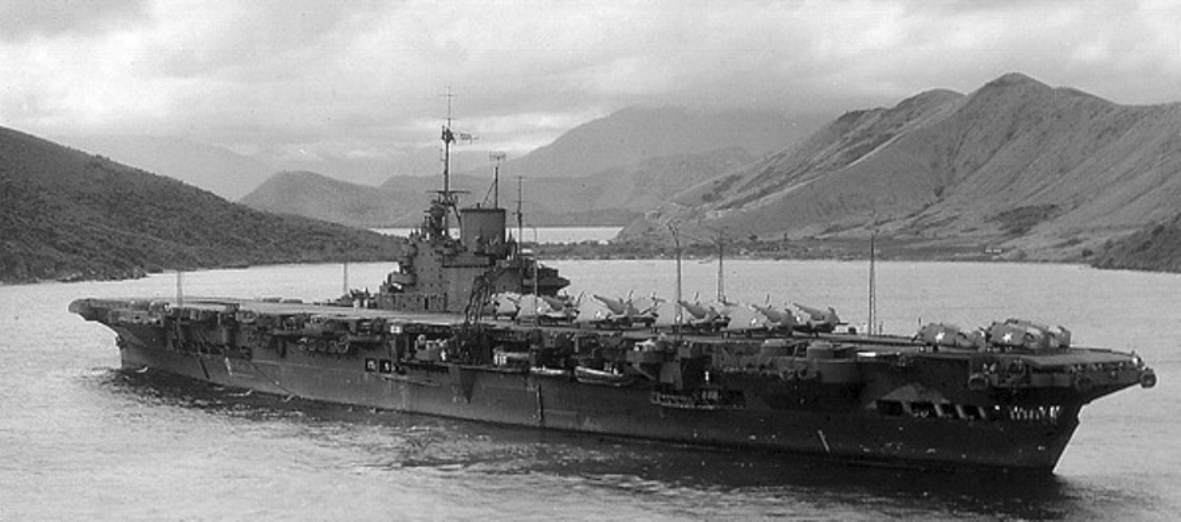
HMS Victorious at Noumea in 1943. during operations with the U.S. Navy Task Force 36 in the Solomons, between May and September 1943

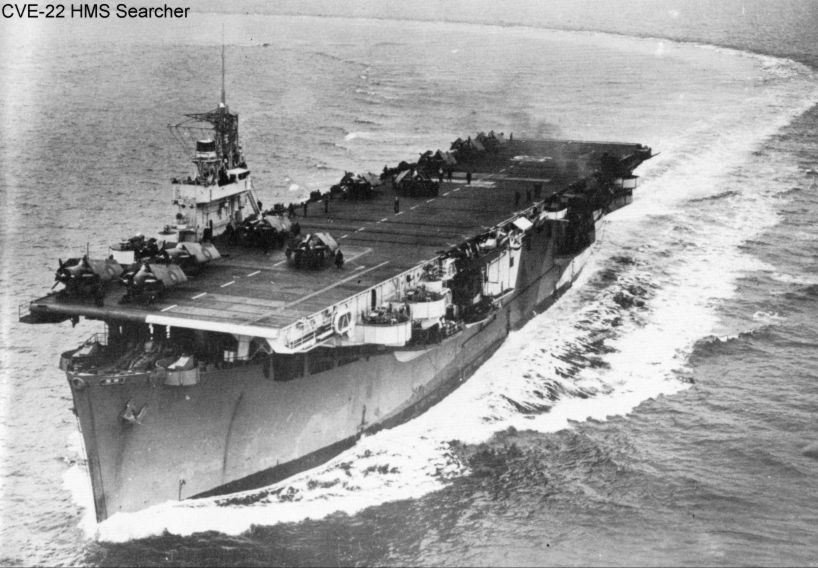
HMS Searcher

- Royal Naval Air Station Donibristle (HMS Merlin), Fife, (16 July - 3 November 1941)
- Royal Naval Air Station St Merryn (HMS Vulture), Cornwall, (3 November - 1 December 1941)
- Royal Naval Air Station Yeovilton (HMS Heron), Somerset, (1 - 15 December 1941)
- Royal Air Force Gosport, Hampshire, (15 December 1941 - 13 February 1942)
- Royal Air Force Turnhouse, Edinburgh, (13 Gp) (13 February - 17 March 1942)
- Royal Naval Air Station Machrihanish (HMS Landrail), Argyll and Bute, (17 - 22 March 1942)
- HMS Illustrious (22 March - 13 July 1942)
  - Detached Flight two aircraft:
    - HMS Archer (9 April - 13 July 1942)
    - RN Air Section Floyd Bennett Field, Brooklyn, New York, (13 July - 30 September 1942)
    - Detached Flight disbanded - (30 September 1942)
  - RN Air Section Stamford Hill, South Africa, (Detachment four aircraft 22–28 April 1942)
- Royal Naval Air Station Mackinnon Road, Kenya, (19 August - 5 September 1942)
- HMS Illustrious (merged into 881 Naval Air Squadron 5 September 1942)
- Royal Naval Air Station Donibristle (HMS Merlin), Fife, (7 - 29 September 1942)
- Royal Air Force Lossiemouth, Moray, (29 September - 1 October 1942)
- Royal Air Force Skeabrae, Mainland, Orkney, (14 Gp) (1 - 6 October 1942)
- HMS Victorious (6 October - 22 November 1942)
- Royal Naval Air Station Machrihanish (HMS Landrail), Argyll and Bute, (22 - 23 November 1942)
- Royal Naval Air Station Hatston (HMS Sparrowhawk), Mainland, Orkney, (23 November - 14 December 1942)
- Royal Naval Air Station Machrihanish (HMS Landrail), Argyll and Bute, (14 - 20 December 1942)
- HMS Victorious (20 December 1942 - 1 January 1943)
- RN Air Section Norfolk, Virginia, (1 January - 1 February 1943)
- HMS Victorious (1 February - 4 March 1943)
- Naval Air Station Barbers Point, Hawaii, (4 March - 7 May 1943)
- HMS Victorious (7 - 17 May 1943)
- Tontouta Air Base, New Caledonia, (17 - 24 May 1943)
- HMS Victorious (24 May - 3 June 1943)
- Tontouta Air Base, New Caledonia, (3 - 16 June 1943)
- HMS Victorious (16 - 20 June 1943)
- Tontouta Air Base, New Caledonia, (20 - 27 June 1943)
- HMS Victorious (27 June - 24 July 1943)
- Tontouta Air Base, New Caledonia, (25 - 31 July 1943)
- HMS Victorious (31 July - 9 August 1943)
- Naval Air Station Barbers Point, Hawaii, (9 -12 August 1943)
- HMS Victorious (12 August - 1 September 1943)
- Naval Air Station Willow Grove, Pennsylvania, (1 - 11 September 1943)
- RN Air Section Norfolk, Virginia, (11 - 14 September 1943)
- HMS Victorious (14 - 26 September 1943)
- Royal Naval Air Station Eglinton (HMS Gannet), County Londonderry, (26 September - 9 December 1943)
- HMS Searcher (9 December 1943 - 10 January 1944)
- RN Air Section Floyd Bennett, Brooklyn, New York, (10 - 12 January 1944))
- RN Air Section Brunswick, Maine, (12 January - 3 February 1944)
- RN Air Section Floyd Bennett, Brooklyn, New York, (3 - 4 February 1944)
- RN Air Section Norfolk, Virginia, (4 - 8 February 1944)
- HMS Searcher (8 - 28 February 1944)
- Royal Naval Air Station Eglinton (HMS Gannet), County Londonderry, (28 February 2 March 1944)
- HMS Searcher (2 March - 6 April 1944)
- Royal Naval Air Station Hatston (HMS Sparrowhawk), Mainland, Orkney, (6 - 11 April 1944)
- HMS Fencer (11 - 15 April 1944)
- Royal Naval Air Station Hatston (HMS Sparrowhawk), Mainland, Orkney, (15 - 18 April 1944)
- HMS Searcher (18 April - 17 May 1944)
  - Royal Naval Air Station Hatston (HMS Sparrowhawk), Mainland, Orkney/HMS Striker (Detachment four aircraft 11 May 1944)
- Royal Naval Air Station Hatston (HMS Sparrowhawk), Mainland, Orkney, (17 May - 2 June 1944)
  - HMS Furious (Detachment four aircraft 28 May - 2 June 1944)
- Royal Naval Air Station Hatston (HMS Sparrowhawk), Mainland, Orkney, (2 - 7 June 1944)
- HMS Searcher (7 June - 12 October 1944)
  - Royal Naval Air Station Takali (HMS Goldfinch), Malta, (Detachment ten aircraft 25 July - 7 August 1944)
  - Royal Naval Air Station Dekheila (HMS Grebe), Egypt, (Detachment sixteen aircraft 1–9 September 1944)
  - Royal Naval Air Station Dekheila (HMS Grebe), Egypt, (Detachment four aircraft 21 Septmebr - 1 October 1944)
- Royal Naval Air Station Ballyhalbert, County Down, (12 - 29 October 1944)
- Royal Air Force Long Kesh, Lisburn, (29 October - 2 December 1944)
- Royal Naval Air Station Ауr (HMS Wagtail), South Ayrshire, (2 - 9 December 1944)
- Royal Air Force Long Kesh, Lisburn, (9 December 1944 - 9 February 1945)
- HMS Searcher (9 February - 29 March 1945)
- Royal Naval Air Station Grimsetter (HMS Robin), Mainland, Orkney, (29 March - 5 April 1945)
- HMS Searcher (5 - 13 April 1945)
- Royal Naval Air Station Grimsetter (HMS Robin), Mainland, Orkney, (13 - 17 April 1945)
- HMS Searcher (17 - 19 April 1945)
  - HMS Vindex (Detachment four aircraft 17 April - 6 May 1945)
- Royal Naval Air Station Grimsetter (HMS Robin), Mainland, Orkney, (19 - 27 April 1945)
- HMS Searcher (27 April - 10 May 1945)
- Royal Naval Air Station Grimsetter (HMS Robin), Mainland, Orkney, (10 - 21 May 1945)
- Royal Naval Air Station Machrihanish (HMS Landrail), Argyll and Bute, (21 - 27 May 1945)
- Royal Naval Air Station Ауr (HMS Wagtail), South Ayrshire, (27 May - 26 June 1945)
- HMS Searcher (25 June - 20 July 1945)
- RN Air Section Cochin (HMS Kalugu), India, (20 July - 8 August 1945)
- HMS Searcher (8 - 20 August 1945)
- Royal Naval Air Station Katukurunda (HMS Ukussa), Ceylon, (20 August - 19 September 1945)
- HMS Searcher (19 September - 9 October 1945)
- disbanded United Kingdom (9 October 1945)

== Commanding officers ==
List of commanding officers of 882 Naval Air Squadron:

- Lieutenant O.N. Bailey, RN, from 16 July 1941
- Lieutenant F.C. Furlong, RNVR, from 10 August 1941
- Lieutenant Commander H.J.F. Lane, RN, from 12 September 1941
- disbanded - 5 September 1942
- Lieutenant(A) I.L.F. Lowe, DSC, RN, from 7 September 1942
- Lieutenant Commander E.A. Shaw, RN, from 3 December 1942
- Lieutenant Commander(A) J. Cooper, DSC, RNVR, from 25 October 1943
- Lieutenant Commander(A) G.R. Henderson, DSC, RNVR, from 5 July 1944
- Lieutenant Commander R.A. Bird, RN, from 18 November 1944
- Lieutenant Commander(A) G.A.M. Flood, RNVR, from 5 June 1945
- disbanded - 9 October 1945

Note: Abbreviation (A) signifies Air Branch of the RN or RNVR.
