= HMS Empress (D42) =

American escort carrier transferred to the Royal Navy

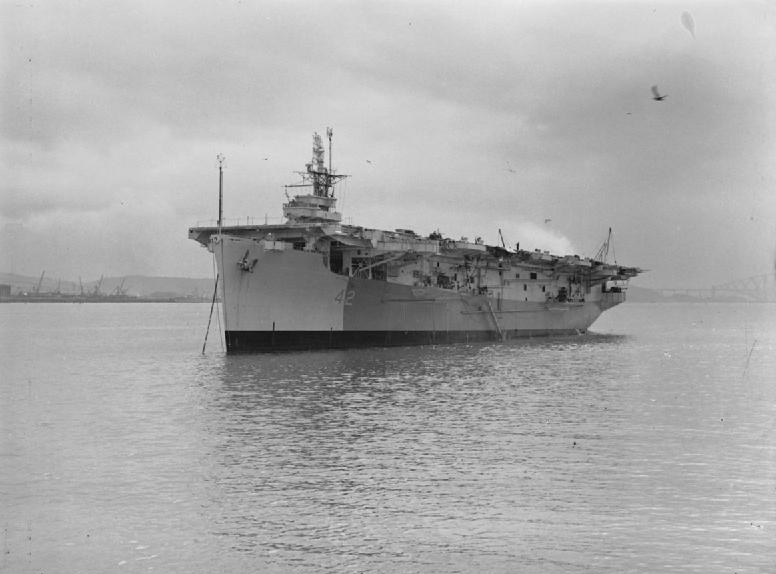
- HMS Empress

History

United States
- Name: USS Carnegie
- Laid down: 9 September 1942
- Launched: 30 December 1942
- Fate: Transferred to Royal Navy

United Kingdom
- Name: HMS Empress
- Commissioned: 12 August 1943
- Decommissioned: 28 March 1946
- Identification: Pennant number:D42
- Fate: Sold for scrap 1946

General characteristics
- Class & type: Bogue-class escort carrier (USA); Ruler-class escort carrier (UK)
- Displacement: 7,800 tons
- Length: 495 ft 7 in (151.05 m)
- Beam: 69 ft 6 in (21.18 m)
- Draught: 26 ft (7.9 m)
- Propulsion: Steam turbines, 1 shaft, 8,500 shp (6.3 MW)
- Speed: 17.5 knots (32.4 km/h)
- Complement: 890 officers and men
- Armament: 2 × 4"/50, 5"/38 or 5"/51 guns; 8 × twin 40 mm Bofors; 35 × single 20 mm Oerlikon
- Aircraft carried: 28

USS Carnegie (CVE-38) (previously AVG-38 then later ACV-38) was an escort aircraft carrier built in 1942-43 for transfer to the United Kingdom. She was reclassified ACV-38 on 20 August 1942, and CVE-38 on 15 July 1943. She was commissioned on 9 August 1943 for a period of three days prior to being turned over to the United Kingdom, under whom she served as HMS Empress (D42).

== Design and description ==
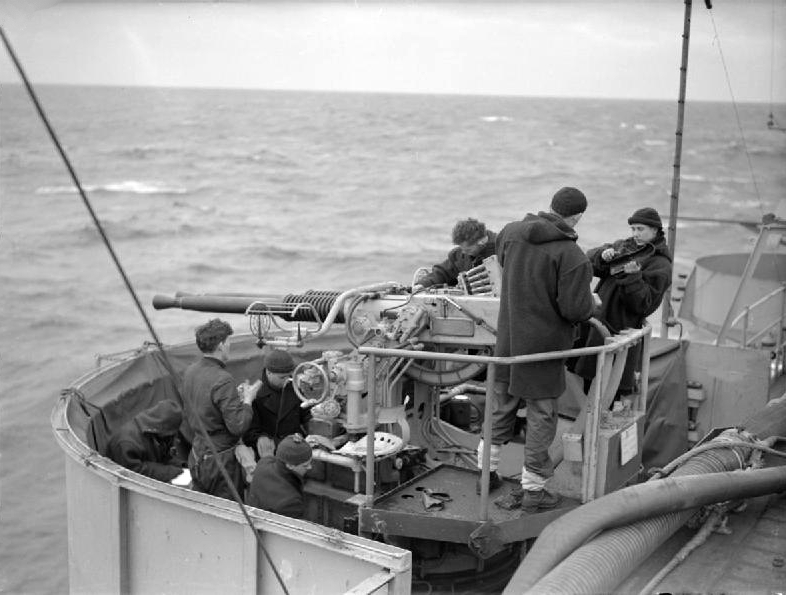
Twin 40 mm Bofors anti-aircraft gun.

These ships were all larger and had a greater aircraft capacity than all the preceding American built escort carriers. They were also all laid down as escort carriers and not converted merchant ships. All the ships had a complement of 646 men and an overall length of 492 feet 3 inches (150.0 m), a beam of 69 feet 6 inches (21.2 m) and a draught of 25 ft 6 in (7.8 m). Propulsion was provided a steam turbine, two boilers connected to one shaft giving 9,350 brake horsepower (SHP), which could propel the ship at 16.5 knots (30.6 km/h; 19.0 mph).

Aircraft facilities were a small combined bridge–flight control on the starboard side, two aircraft lifts 43 feet (13.1 m) by 34 feet (10.4 m), one aircraft catapult and nine arrestor wires. Aircraft could be housed in the 260 feet (79.2 m) by 62 feet (18.9 m) hangar below the flight deck. Armament comprised: two 4"/50, 5"/38 or 5"/51 Dual Purpose guns in single mounts, sixteen 40 mm Bofors anti-aircraft guns in twin mounts and twenty 20 mm Oerlikon anti-aircraft cannons in single mounts. They had a maximum aircraft capacity of twenty-four aircraft which could be a mixture of Grumman Martlet, Vought F4U Corsair or Hawker Sea Hurricane fighter aircraft and Fairey Swordfish or Grumman Avenger anti-submarine aircraft.

== Service history ==
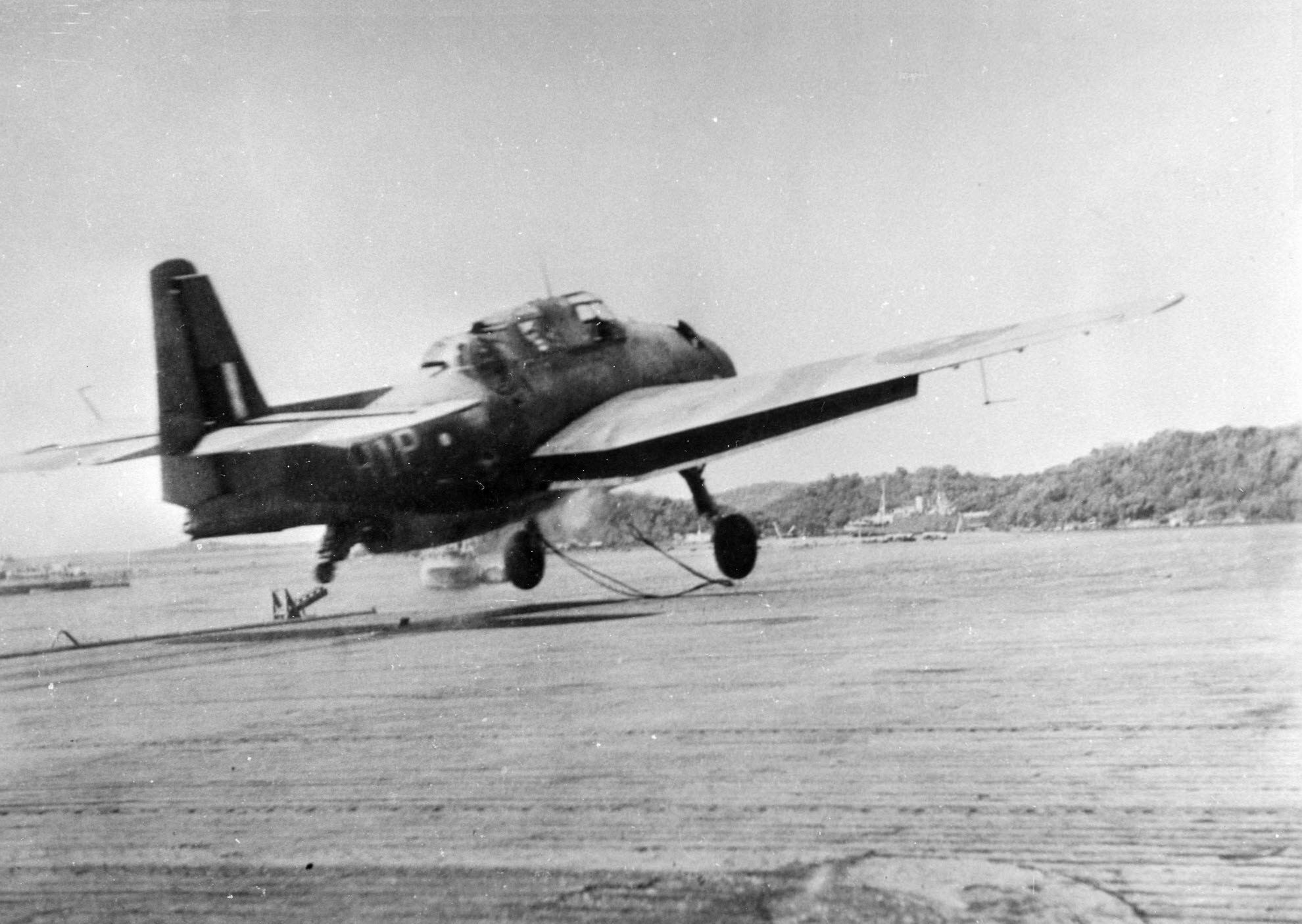
An 845 NAS Avenger taking off from HMS Empress off Trincomalee.

During World War II, she served in both the Pacific and Indian Oceans. In September 1945, Empress was involved in Operation Tiderace, the reoccupation of Singapore from the Japanese. On 28 January 1946, she was restored to United States custody, was stricken from the Naval Vessel Register on 28 March 1946 and was sold for scrap 21 June 1946.

== See also ==
- Andrew Carnegie
