= HMS Emperor (D98) =

Former U.S. Navy escort carrier transferred to Royal Navy

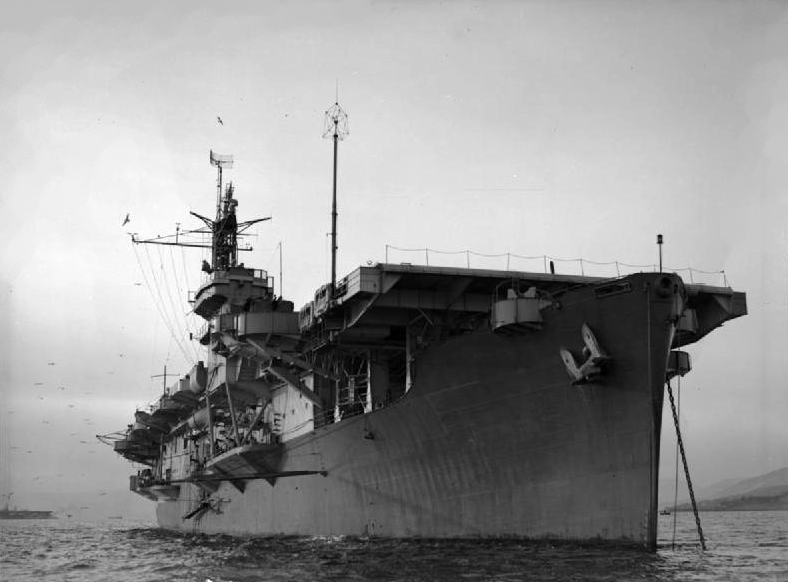
- HMS Emperor

History

United States
- Name: USS Pybus
- Builder: Seattle-Tacoma Shipbuilding Corporation
- Laid down: 23 June 1942
- Launched: 7 October 1942
- Commissioned: 31 May 1943
- Decommissioned: 6 August 1943
- Identification: AVG-34; ACV-34; CVE-34
- Fate: Transferred to Royal Navy

United Kingdom
- Name: HMS Emperor
- Commissioned: 6 August 1943
- Decommissioned: 28 March 1946
- Identification: Pennant number:D98
- Fate: Returned to US, sold for scrap 1946

General characteristics
- Class & type: Bogue-class escort carrier (USA); Ruler-class escort carrier (UK)
- Displacement: 15,126 tons (full load)
- Length: 492 ft (150 m)
- Beam: 69 ft 6 in (21.18 m)
- Draught: 26 ft 3 in (8.00 m)
- Propulsion: Steam turbines, 1 shaft, 8,500 shp (6,300 kW)
- Speed: 16.5 knots (30.6 km/h; 19.0 mph)
- Complement: 646 officers and men
- Armament: 2 × 4"/50, 5"/38 or 5"/51 guns
- Aircraft carried: 24

Service record
- Operations: Operation Tungsten (1944); Operation Overlord (1944); Operation Dragoon (1944); Operation Dracula (1945); Operation Tiderace (1945)

USS Pybus (CVE-34) was initially a United States Navy Bogue-class escort carrier. The ship was transferred to the United Kingdom for service in the Royal Navy as the Ruler-class escort carrier HMS Emperor (D98) as part of the Lend-Lease program of World War II. Entering service in 1943, the ship took part in operations against the Tirpitz and the invasions of Normandy and southern France. She was transferred to the Indian Ocean fleet for the last stages of the war, supporting the landings in Burma and the early stages of the naval hunt for the Japanese cruiser Haguro. After the war she was tasked with assisting the re-occupation of Malaya before returning to the UK in December 1945 carrying 800 Squadron home as passengers. She left the UK in January 1946 and was returned to the USA The carrier was sold for scrap in 1946.

== Design and description ==
The Bogue class were all larger and had a greater aircraft capacity than all the preceding American built escort carriers. They were also all laid down as escort carriers and not converted merchant ships. All the ships had a complement of 646 and an overall length of 492 feet 3 inches (150.0 m), a beam of 69 feet 6 inches (21.2 m) and a draught of 25 ft 6 in (7.8 m). Propulsion was provided a steam turbine, two boilers connected to one shaft giving 9,350 shaft horsepower (6,970 kW), which could propel the ship at 16.5 knots (30.6 km/h; 19.0 mph).

Aircraft facilities were a small combined bridge–flight control on the starboard side, two aircraft lifts 43 feet (13.1 m) by 34 feet (10.4 m), one aircraft catapult and nine arrestor wires. Aircraft could be housed in the 260 feet (79.2 m) by 62 feet (18.9 m) hangar below the flight deck. Armament comprised two 4"/50, 5"/38 or 5"/51 dual purpose guns in single mounts, sixteen 40 mm Bofors anti-aircraft guns in twin mounts and twenty 20 mm Oerlikon anti-aircraft cannons in single mounts. They had a maximum aircraft capacity of twenty-four aircraft which could be a mixture of Grumman Martlet, Grumman F6F Hellcat, Vought F4U Corsair or Hawker Sea Hurricane fighter aircraft and Fairey Swordfish or Grumman Avenger anti-submarine aircraft.

== Construction and career ==
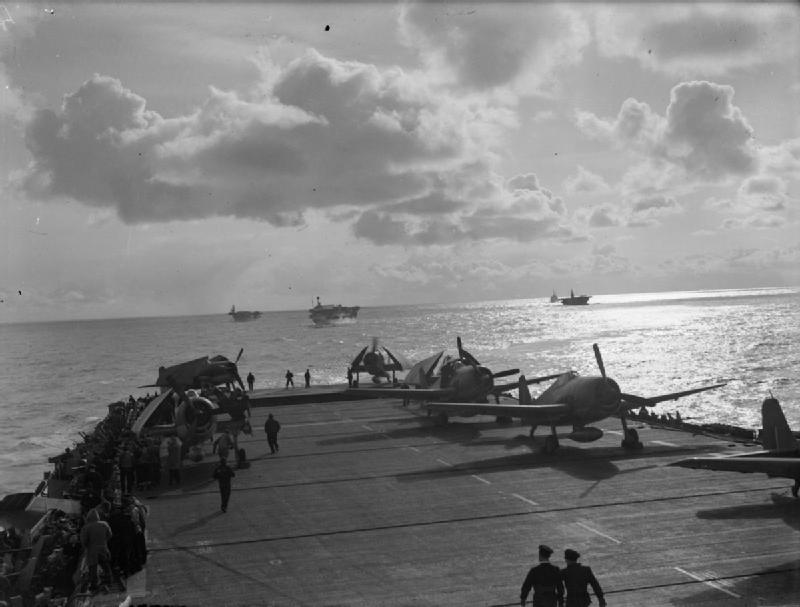
F6F Hellcats aboard HMS Emperor, 4 April 1944

Pybus, originally designated AVG-34, was laid down on 23 June 1942 as MC Hull No. 245 by Seattle-Tacoma Shipbuilding, Washington. Reclassified as ACV-34 on 20 August 1942, the ship was launched on 7 October 1942 and commissioned into the United States Navy on 31 May 1943 at the Puget Sound Navy Yard, Washington. Pybus was reclassified as CVE-34 on 15 July 1943 and assigned for transfer to the United Kingdom under the Lend-Lease agreement. From March to April 1945 she was attached to the 21st Aircraft Carrier Squadron.

Pybus reported for duty with the Pacific Fleet after shakedown, in a temporary status, before she decommissioned on 6 August 1943 at New York. She was accepted that day by the UK and placed in service as HMS Emperor with the pennant number D98. During her British service, she helped provide fighter cover for airstrikes on Tirpitz, served on anti-submarine detail during Operation Overlord, and helped support the invasion of Southern France (Operation Dragoon).

Following the war, Emperor was returned to the United States Navy on 12 February 1946, struck from the Naval Vessel Register on 28 March 1946, and sold 14 May to Patapsco Scrap Co., Baltimore, Maryland for scrapping.
