= HMS Pursuer (D73) =

1943 Attacker-class escort carrier

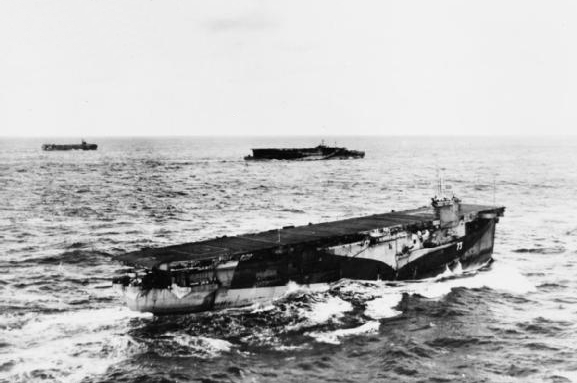
- HMS Pursuer in March 1944. HMS Furious can be seen in the background

History

United States
- Name: USS St. George
- Builder: Ingalls Shipbuilding
- Laid down: 31 July 1941
- Launched: 18 July 1942
- Fate: Transferred to Royal Navy

United Kingdom
- Name: HMS Pursuer
- Commissioned: 14 June 1943
- Decommissioned: 12 February 1946
- Stricken: 28 March 1946
- Fate: Scrapped in 1946

General characteristics
- Class & type: Attacker-class escort carrier
- Displacement: 14,400 tons
- Length: 491 ft 6 in (149.81 m)
- Beam: 105 ft (32 m)
- Draught: 26 ft (7.9 m)
- Propulsion: Steam turbines, one shaft, 8,500 shp (6,300 kW)
- Speed: 18 knots (33 km/h; 21 mph)
- Complement: 646 officers and ratings
- Armament: 2 × 4"/50, 5"/38 or 5"/51 guns; 8 × twin 40 mm Bofors; 35 × single 20 mm Oerlikon
- Aircraft carried: 20

Service record
- Part of: Home Fleet
- Operations: Operation Tungsten; Invasion of Normandy; Operation Dragoon

The ship which became HMS Pursuer (D73) was laid down on 31 July 1941 as the (second) SS Mormacland, a C3-S-A2 freighter being built for Moore-McCormick Lines, Inc., under a Maritime Commission contract (MC 163) at the yard of Ingalls Shipbuilding, of Pascagoula, Mississippi, as that yard's Hull No. 296. She was given the provisional designation USS St. George (AVG-17) by the United States Navy on 7 January 1942, and was earmarked for assignment to the British Royal Navy under Lend-Lease on 24 February 1942. Sponsored by Mrs. Mary Ann S. Bartman, the vessel was launched on 18 July 1942; reclassified as ACV-17 on 20 August 1942; and commissioned into the US Navy, transferred to Britain, decommissioned, and commissioned into the Royal Navy as HMS Pursuer (D73), all on 14 June 1943. She was reclassified as CVE-17 on U.S. Navy books on 15 July 1943.

== Design and description ==
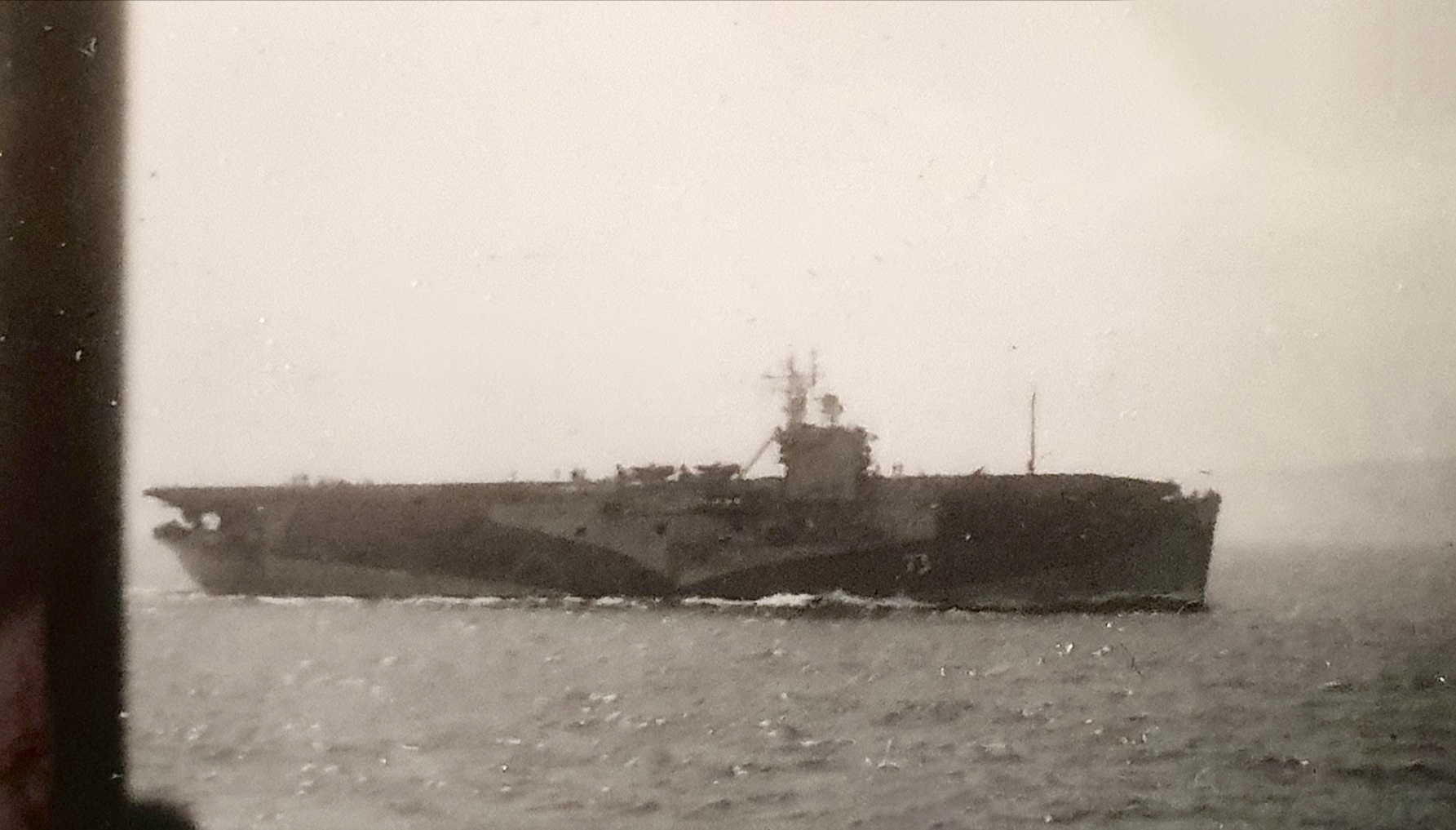
HMS Pursuer in the Mediterranean Sea in 1943

There were eight Attacker-class escort carriers in service with the Royal Navy during the Second World War. They were built between 1941 and 1942 by the Ingalls Shipbuilding and Western Pipe & Steel shipyards in the United States, both building four ships each.

The vessels had a complement of 646 officers and ratings and crew accommodation was different from the normal Royal Navy's arrangements. The separate messes no longer had to prepare their own food, as everything was cooked in the galley and served cafeteria style in a central dining area. They were also equipped with a modern laundry and a barber shop. The traditional hammocks were replaced by three tier bunk beds, eighteen to a cabin which were hinged and could be tied up to provide extra space when not in use.

The ships dimensions were; an overall length of 492.25 feet (150.04 m), a beam of 69.5 feet (21.2 m) and a height of 23.25 ft (7.09 m). They had a displacement of 11,420 long tons (11,600 t) at deep load. Propulsion was provided by four diesel engines connected to one shaft giving 8,500 brake horsepower (6,300 kW), which could propel the ship at 17 knots (31 km/h; 20 mph).

Aircraft facilities were a small combined bridge–flight control on the starboard side above the 450-by-120-foot (137 m × 37 m) flight deck, two aircraft lifts 42 by 34 feet (13 by 10 m), and nine arrestor wires. Aircraft could be housed in the 260-by-62-foot (79 by 19 m) hangar below the flight deck. Armament comprised two 4"/50, 5"/38 or 5"/51 in single mounts, eight 40 mm anti-aircraft guns in twin mounts and twenty-one 20 mm anti-aircraft cannon in single or twin mounts. The ships had the capacity for up to eighteen aircraft which could be a mixture of Grumman Martlet, Hawker Sea Hurricane, Vought F4U Corsair fighters and Fairey Swordfish or Grumman Avenger anti-submarine aircraft.

== Operational history ==
Pursuer served in the Home Fleet during World War II, primarily on convoy escort duty. However, on 3 April 1944, she provided fighter support for an air strike on the German battleship Tirpitz in Altenfjord, Norway. On 26 April 1944 Grumman Wildcats of 882 Naval Air Squadron took part in the successful attack on a German convoy off Bodo, northern Norway. It consisted of four medium-sized supply ships and five escort craft. All four supply vessels and one of the escorts were hit with bombs and three of the supply ships were left on fire, the largest having run aground. While this attack was in progress other naval aircraft penetrated Bodo Harbour, where one large supply ship was hit by bombs and set on fire amidships. Pursuer suffered storm damage during this operation and repairs took a month to complete.

She served as an anti-submarine warfare vessel at the Battle of Normandy and in August and September 1944 she was part of a British carrier group providing air cover for the landings in southern France. The carrier was returned to United States custody on 12 February 1946, struck from the Navy Register on 28 March 1946, and sold for scrapping on 14 May that year to the Patapsco Steel Scrap Co., Bethlehem, Pennsylvania.

== Bibliography ==
- Cocker, Maurice (2008). Aircraft-Carrying Ships of the Royal Navy. Stroud, Gloucestershire: The History Press. ISBN 978-0-7524-4633-2.
- Hobbs, David (1996). Aircraft Carriers of the Royal and Commonwealth Navies. London: Greenhill Books. ISBN 1-85367-252-1.
- Hobbs, David (2013). British Aircraft Carriers: Design, Development and Service Histories. Barnsley, UK: Seaforth Publishing. ISBN 978-1-84832-138-0.
- Poolman, Kenneth (1972). Escort Carrier 1941–1945. London: Ian Allan. ISBN 0-7110-0273-8.
