= 4th Naval Fighter Wing =

Royal Navy Fleet Air Arm aircraft wing

- White Ensign
- Active: 25 October 1943 – 25 January 1946
- Country: United Kingdom
- Branch: Royal Navy
- Type: Naval fighter Wing
- Role: Carrier-based fighter
- Size: Three squadrons
- Part of: Fleet Air Arm
- Engagements: World War II: Battle of the Mediterranean; Operation Dragoon; Indian Ocean in World War II; Operation Dracula; Operation Balsam

Commanders
- Notable commanders: Lieutenant Commander(A) A.C. Wallace, RNVR; Lieutenant Commander(A) G.C. Baldwin, DSC, RN

Insignia
- Wing Code: D

Aircraft flown
- Fighter: Supermarine Seafire L Mk.IIc/LR Mk.IIc, L Mk.III, F Mk.XV & F Mk.XVII

4th Naval Fighter Wing ("4 Wing") was a Fleet Air Arm fighter formation of the Royal Navy during the Second World War. It was formed at RNAS Burscough on 25 October 1943 with 807, 809 and 879 Naval Air Squadrons, operating Supermarine Seafire fighter aircraft. The three squadrons were assigned respectively to the escort carriers HMS Hunter, HMS Stalker and HMS Attacker, which were converted to assault carriers. The squadrons subsequently operated from their carriers and from naval air stations during the wing's operational service.

The wing's squadrons deployed to the Mediterranean in 1944 and took part in Operation Dragoon, the Allied invasion of southern France, providing fighter cover, fighter-bomber attacks, tactical reconnaissance and bombardment spotting. They subsequently operated in the Aegean before returning to the United Kingdom in November. In 1945 the squadrons operated with the East Indies Fleet, including during the Burma campaign and subsequent operations against Japanese-held territory in Malaya and Sumatra. The wing was disbanded at RNAS Nutts Corner on 25 January 1946.

== History ==
=== Formation and work-up ===
The 4th Naval Fighter Wing was formed at RNAS Burscough, Lancashire, on 25 October 1943 with 807, 809 and 879 Naval Air Squadrons, operating Supermarine Seafire fighter aircraft. They were assigned to the assault carriers HMS Hunter, HMS Stalker and HMS Attacker respectively. The three carriers had been selected for conversion from escort carriers into assault carriers intended to provide air support during amphibious operations.

879 Squadron moved to RNAS Machrihanish, Argyll and Bute, on 6 October 1943 and then to RAF Andover, Hampshire, the following day before joining the wing at RNAS Burscough on 29 November. HMS Attacker re-embarked 879 Squadron on 29 December. Following damage in a collision with HMS Fencer on 24 January 1944, HMS Attacker entered dockyard repair and her squadrons flew ashore to RNAS Burscough on 6 February. 879 Squadron rejoined the carrier on 16 February and moved to RAF Long Kesh, Lisburn, Norther Ireland, on 24 February for Army co-operation training.

807 Squadron embarked in HMS Hunter on 20–21 January 1944. It subsequently operated ashore before rejoining HMS Hunter at the end of April.

=== Mediterranean operations ===
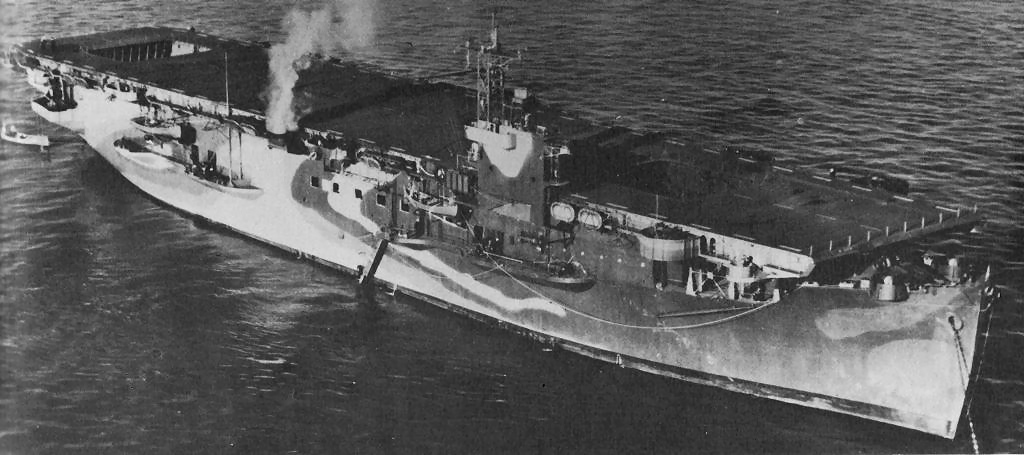
HMS Stalker

The three assault carriers sailed for the Mediterranean on 14 May 1944. During the deployment, the squadrons operated both from their carriers and from shore bases. 879 Squadron operated from Blida, in Algeria, Pomigliano, near Naples, Capodichino, Naples, Orvieto, Umbria and Castiglione during June and July.

During Operation Dragoon in August 1944, HMS Attacker and 879 Squadron formed part of TG88.1, while HMS Hunter with 807 Squadron and HMS Stalker with 809 Squadron formed part of TG88.2. The Supermarine Seafires undertook fighter-bomber, strafing, tactical reconnaissance, force-cover, beach-cover and bombardment-spotting missions in support of the invasion. On D-Day, 879 Squadron had 28 serviceable aircraft available.

807 Squadron flew 307 sorties during Operation Dragoon, while 809 Squadron flew 337. 879 Squadron completed 226 sorties during the operation, including strikes against ground targets, bombardment spotting and tactical reconnaissance.

=== Aegean operations ===
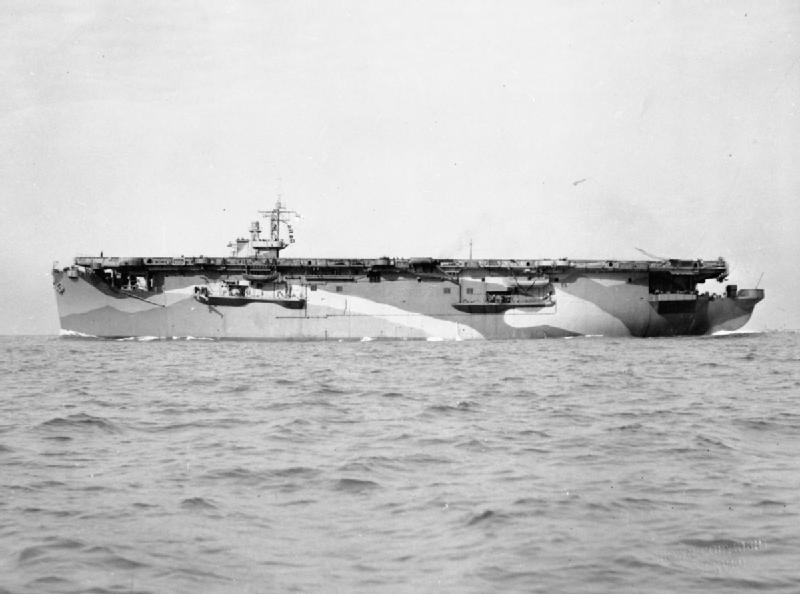
HMS Hunter

In September and October 1944, 807 and 809 Squadrons operated from HMS Hunter and HMS Stalker respectively in the Aegean Sea. Their missions included armed reconnaissance and attacks against shipping and other targets. On 7 October, aircraft from both squadrons attacked a vessel south-west of Lemnos.

879 Squadron also operated in the Aegean during September and October. It flew 240 sorties between 16 September and 29 October.

The three assault carriers sailed together for the United Kingdom on 31 October 1944, reaching Plymouth on 10 November. They were subsequently allocated to the 21st Aircraft Carrier Squadron of the East Indies Fleet.

=== East Indies Fleet ===
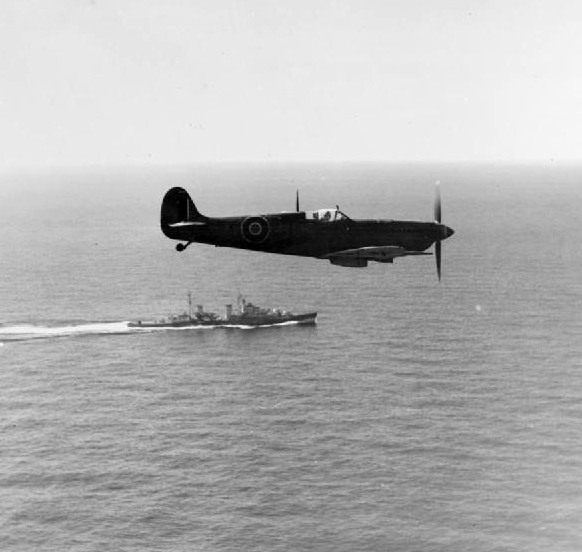
Supermarine Seafire of 807 Squadron during a training flight from RNAS Dekhelia

After returning to the United Kingdom, HMS Hunter, HMS Stalker and HMS Attacker underwent refit and prepared for service with the East Indies Fleet. When HMS Stalker underwent refit at Gibraltar, 809 Squadron transferred to HMS Attacker. On 11 December 1944, 809 and 879 Squadrons were disembarked from HMS Attacker at RNAS Dekheila (HMS Grebe), Alexandria, in Egypt.

807 Squadron re-embarked in HMS Hunter at RNAS Dekheila on 6 March 1945, while 809 Squadron re-embarked in HMS Stalker on 7 March. Both carriers subsequently proceeded to Ceylon, where their squadrons were disembarked at RNAS Katukurunda. 879 Squadron re-embarked in HMS Attacker at RNAS Dekheila on 14 April. The squadron was disembarked at RNAS Katukurunda on 29 April.

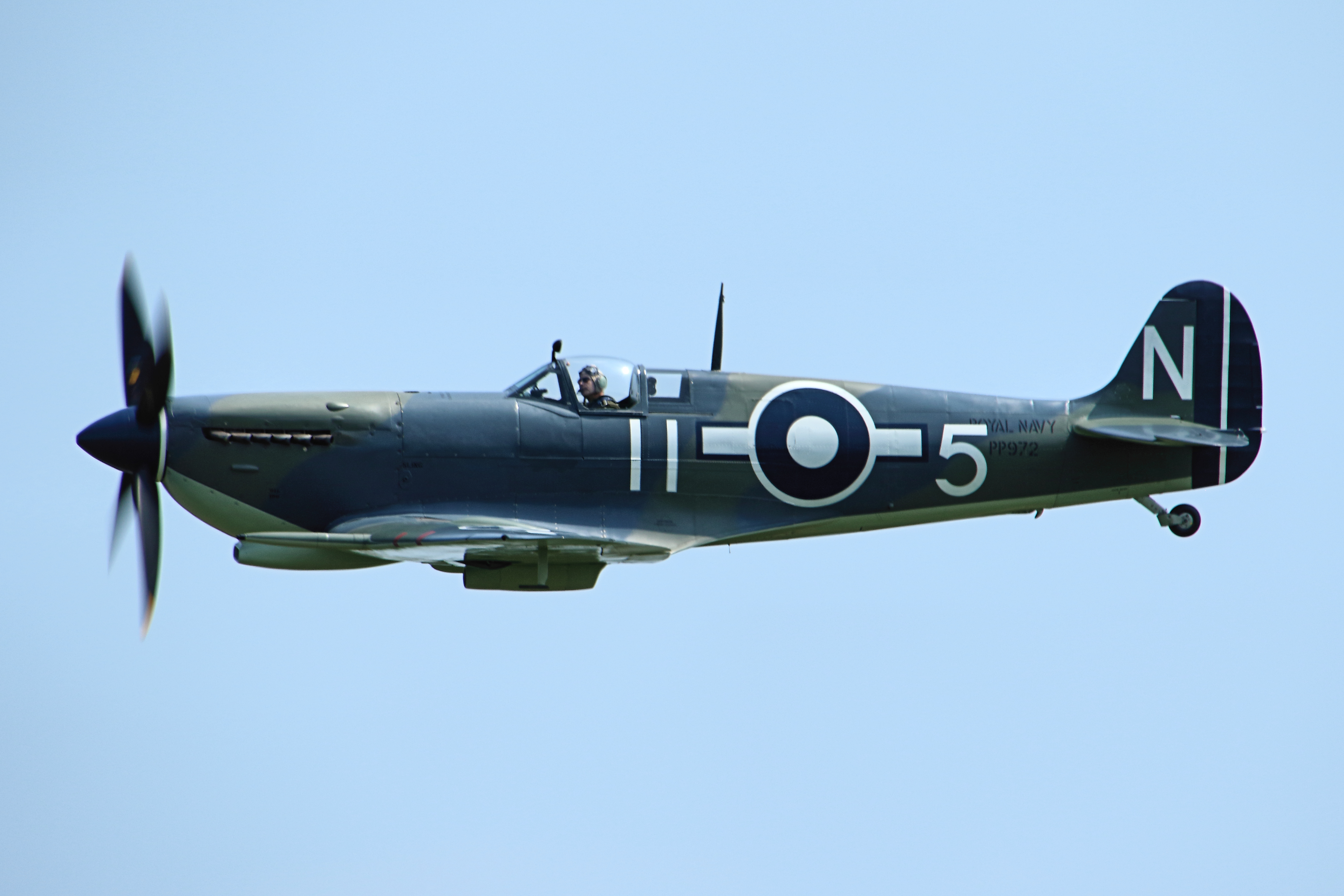
Supermarine Seafire this airframe was operated by 809 Squadron saw service in the Far East onboard HMS Stalker

807 and 809 Squadrons took part in Operation Dracula, the Allied assault on Rangoon, Burma. During the operation, their Supermarine Seafires flew fighter-cover, reconnaissance and attack missions in support of the landings.

In June 1945, 809 Squadron participated in Operation Balsam. HMS Stalker formed part of Force 63, which conducted photographic reconnaissance over southern Malaya and airstrikes against Japanese airfields in Sumatra. On 20 June, 809 Squadron's Supermarine Seafires attacked the airfields at Lhoksemawe, Medan and Binjai.

879 Squadron re-embarked in HMS Attacker on 10 June, returned to RNAS Katukurunda on 7 July, re-embarked three days later and was subsequently disembarked at RNAS Trincomalee (HMS Bambara), Ceylon, on 19 July.

Following the Japanese surrender in August 1945, the three carriers and their squadrons were allocated to operations associated with the reoccupation of Japanese-held territory. HMS Attacker with 879 Squadron, HMS Hunter with 807 Squadron and HMS Stalker with 809 Squadron were all allocated to forces assigned to Operation Jurist, the planned reoccupation of Penang. The operation was postponed following the Japanese surrender.

=== Return and disbandment ===
Following the Japanese surrender, the constituent squadrons continued their post-war service with the East Indies Fleet. 879 Squadron returned to HMS Attacker in October 1945 and sailed for the United Kingdom. It was subsequently flown ashore to RNAS Nutts Corner, County Antrim, Northern Ireland, where it re-equipped with Supermarine Seafire F Mk.XVII fighter aircraft. The squadron was disbanded on 7 January 1946.

The 4th Naval Fighter Wing was disbanded at RNAS Nutts Corner on 25 January 1946.

== Squadrons ==
4th Naval Fighter Wing consisted of a number of Fleet Air Arm squadrons:

- 807 Naval Air Squadron, October 1943 - January 1946
- 809 Naval Air Squadron, October 1943 - January 1946
- 879 Naval Air Squadron, October 1943 - January 1946

== Naval air stations and carrier deployments ==
The wing's squadrons operated from Royal Navy and Royal Air Force stations and from the three assault carriers to which they were assigned.

- Royal Naval Air Station Burscough (HMS Ringtail), Lancashire.
  - The wing was formed there on 25 October 1943. 879 Squadron arrived on 29 November and returned to HMS Attacker on 29 December. 807 Squadron embarked in HMS Hunter on 20–21 January 1944.
- Royal Air Force Andover, Hampshire.
  - 879 Squadron moved there from RNAS Machrihanish on 7 October 1943 before joining the wing at RNAS Burscough.
- HMS Hunter
  - 807 Naval Air Squadron embarked on 20–21 January 1944. It subsequently operated ashore before rejoining the carrier at the end of April. HMS Hunter then deployed to the Mediterranean and later to the East Indies Fleet with 807 Squadron.
- HMS Stalker
  - 809 Naval Air Squadron operated with HMS Stalker during the Mediterranean deployment and Aegean operations. In November 1944 it transferred to HMS Attacker during HMS Stalker's refit, re-embarking in HMS Stalker at RNAS Dekheila on 7 March 1945.
- HMS Attacker
  - 879 Naval Air Squadron re-embarked on 29 December 1943 and operated with the carrier in the Mediterranean in 1944. During Operation Dragoon, 879 Squadron formed part of TG88.1. In December 1944, 809 Squadron also operated from HMS Attacker before both squadrons were disembarked at RNAS Dekheila on 11 December. 879 Squadron re-embarked on 14 April 1945, was disembarked at RNAS Katukurunda on 29 April, re-embarked on 10 June, returned to RNAS Katukurunda on 7 July, re-embarked three days later and was finally disembarked at RNAS Trincomalee on 19 July.
- Royal Air Force Long Kesh, Lisburn, Northern Ireland.
  - 879 Squadron operated there from 24 February 1944 for Army co-operation training before the Mediterranean deployment.
- RN Air Section Gibraltar, Gibraltar.
  - 879 Squadron operated a detachment from the station during the Mediterranean deployment in May and June 1944.
- Blida, Algeria.
  - 879 Squadron operated from the station during its Mediterranean deployment in 1944.
- Pomigliano, near Naples and Capodichino, Naples, Italy.
  - 879 Squadron operated from these Italian bases during the Mediterranean campaign.
- Orvieto, Umbria and Castiglione, Italy.
  - 879 Squadron operated from these Italian bases during the Mediterranean campaign.
- Royal Naval Air Station Dekheila (HMS Grebe), Alexandria, Egypt.
  - 809 and 879 Squadrons were disembarked there from HMS Attacker on 11 December 1944. 807 Squadron also re-embarked from RNAS Dekheila in HMS Hunter on 6 March 1945, while 809 Squadron re-embarked in HMS Stalker on 7 March.
- Royal Naval Air Station Katukurunda (HMS Ukussa), Ceylon.
  - 807 and 809 Squadrons were disembarked there from HMS Hunter and HMS Stalker respectively in March 1945. 879 Squadron was disembarked there from HMS Attacker on 29 April and returned there on 7 July.
- Royal Naval Air Station Trincomalee (HMS Bambara), Ceylon.
  - 879 Squadron was disembarked there on 19 July 1945. 809 Squadron also operated from RNAS Trincomalee during the later East Indies Fleet operations.
- Royal Naval Air Station Nutts Corner (HMS Pintail), County Antrim, Northern Ireland.
  - 879 Squadron returned there in November 1945 and re-equipped with Supermarine Seafire F.XVII aircraft before disbandment on 7 January 1946. The 4th Naval Fighter Wing was disbanded at RNAS Nutts Corner on 25 January 1946.

== Aircraft ==
Naval Air Squadrons assigned to 4 Wing flew different variants of one aircraft type:

- Supermarine Seafire L Mk.IIc/LR Mk.IIc fighter aircraft (1943 - 1945)
- Supermarine Seafire L Mk.III fighter aircraft (1944 - 1945)
- Supermarine Seafire F Mk.XV fighter aircraft (1945)
- Supermarine Seafire F Mk.XVII fighter aircraft (1945 - 1946)

== Wing leader ==
The wing's recorded commanding officer chronology was:

- Lieutenant Commander(A) A.C. Wallace, RNVR, from 25 October 1943
- Lieutenant Commander(A) G.C. Baldwin, DSC, RN, from 3 June 1944
- none, from 16 November 1945
- disbanded - 25 January 1946

Note: Abbreviation (A) signifies Air Branch of the RN or RNVR.

== See also ==
- Fleet Air Arm
- List of aircraft wings of the Royal Navy
- 807 Naval Air Squadron
- 809 Naval Air Squadron
- 879 Naval Air Squadron
- HMS Hunter
- HMS Stalker
- HMS Attacker
- East Indies Fleet
