= George Baldwin (Royal Navy officer) =

Royal Navy officer and Fleet Air Arm pilot (1921–2005)

Captain George Clifton Baldwin CBE DSC & Bar
- Born: 17 January 1921
- Died: 11 November 2005 (aged 84)
- Military career
- Allegiance: United Kingdom
- Branch: Royal Navy
- Service years: 1939–1968
- Rank: Captain
- Nickname: Jimmy Baldwin
- Commands: RNAS Yeovilton; RNAS Lossiemouth; 800 Naval Air Squadron; 4th Naval Fighter Wing; 807 Naval Air Squadron
- Conflicts: Second World War
- Awards: Commander of the Order of the British Empire; Distinguished Service Cross and bar

Captain George Clifton Baldwin, CBE, DSC & Bar (17 January 1921 – 11 November 2005), known as Jimmy Baldwin, was a Royal Navy officer and Fleet Air Arm aviator. He served as a naval fighter pilot during the Second World War, commanding 807 Naval Air Squadron and the 4th Naval Fighter Wing. After the war he qualified as an Empire Test Pilot and worked in carrier trials and naval jet aviation. He later commanded 800 Naval Air Squadron, which introduced the Supermarine Attacker into operational naval service, and subsequently held senior appointments including Director of Naval Air Warfare at the Ministry of Defence. He was an advocate of retaining and developing British aircraft-carrier aviation.

== Early life and entry into the Royal Navy ==
Baldwin was born on 17 January 1921. He was educated at Sleaford Grammar School and Hitchin Grammar School. He entered the Royal Navy in March 1939 as a short-service midshipman, shortly before the outbreak of the Second World War.

He undertook flying training while attending the Royal Naval College, Greenwich, travelling to Gravesend, Kent, for instruction on de Havilland Tiger Moth trainer aircraft. He received his pilot's wings in January 1940 and subsequently undertook deck-landing training aboard the aircraft carrier HMS Argus off southern France. He was then posted to 801 Naval Air Squadron, which operated Blackburn Skua and Blackburn Roc aircraft.

=== Second World War ===
Baldwin served with 801 Naval Air Squadron during the early wartime campaigns, including operations associated with the Norwegian campaign. He subsequently became a pilot with 807 Naval Air Squadron, which was equipped with the Supermarine Seafire. Baldwin was awarded the Distinguished Service Cross in 1941. In July 1942 he became 807 Squadron's senior pilot.

During operations in North Africa, flying from the fleet carrier HMS Furious, Baldwin engaged Vichy French Dewoitine D.520 fighters and he was credited him with shooting one down, described as the first air-to-air victory by a Seafire.

In September 1943, Baldwin operated with Force V during the Allied landings at Salerno. Flying Seafires from the Attacker-class escort carrier HMS Battler, he and other pilots supported the landings and subsequently operated from an improvised airstrip at Paestum. The carrier force remained in the area after the initial landings because of the difficulty of establishing adequate land-based air support.

Baldwin took command of 807 Naval Air Squadron in October 1943. In 1944 the squadron formed part of the 4th Naval Fighter Wing, which he commanded. The wing participated in Operation Dragoon, the Allied landings in southern France in August 1944, and subsequently operated against German forces in the Aegean during operations including Outing, Cablegram and Contempt.

Baldwin was awarded a bar to his Distinguished Service Cross for his service during the Aegean operations and the relief of Greece. The award being attributed to his distinguished service, efficiency and zeal while serving in the Bogue-class escort carrier HMS Attacker and with light coastal forces during the clearance of the Aegean and relief of Greece.

Following operations in the Mediterranean, the 4th Naval Fighter Wing was rested in Egypt before embarking in the escort carriers HMS Hunter and HMS Stalker for service with the East Indies Fleet. Baldwin was present at the Japanese surrender in Singapore in September 1945. The wing was disbanded later that year.

=== Post-war test pilot and carrier aviation ===
After five years of continuous flying operations, Baldwin accepted a permanent Royal Navy commission in late 1945, retaining the rank of acting lieutenant commander. In 1946–47 he qualified as an Empire Test Pilot. He was appointed to the Carrier Trials Unit in 1948 and subsequently served at the Central Flying School in 1949.

Baldwin became commanding officer of 800 Naval Air Squadron on 22 August 1951. The squadron was established as the Royal Navy's first operational squadron of jet aircraft and was equipped with the Supermarine Attacker, intended to embark in the Audacious-class aircraft carrier HMS Eagle.

His post-war flying work also involved the development of carrier aviation. Baldwin participated in early trials of the British-designed angled flight deck aboard the United States Navy's aircraft carrier USS Antietam.

On 19 June 1958, Baldwin flew a United States Navy Vought F-8 Crusader jet fighter at more than 1,000 miles per hour (1,600 km/h) in level flight, making him as one of the first British pilots to exceed that speed in level flight.

=== Senior naval appointments ===
From 1958 Baldwin held a series of staff appointments in Washington and at the Admiralty. His subsequent professional education included the NATO Senior Officers' Nuclear Weapons Course at Oberammergau, the Civil Defence Staff College at Sunningdale and the Imperial Defence College in London.

He commanded Royal Naval Air Station Lossiemouth, Moray, from 1961 to 1963 and during the mid-1960s he served as Director of Naval Air Warfare at the Ministry of Defence.

During this appointment Baldwin advocated the retention and development of aircraft carriers for the Royal Navy. He was a strong supporter of a new generation of large carriers and reportedly argued the Royal Navy's case in discussions with the then Defence Secretary, Denis Healey. This took place during the wider controversy over the proposed CVA-01 carrier programme, which was cancelled in 1966.

Baldwin subsequently commanded Royal Naval Air Station Yeovilton, Somerset, from 1966 to 1968. He maintained his flying qualification until retirement and flew a de Havilland Sea Vixen from RNAS Yeovilton on the day before he left the service.

He retired from the Royal Navy in 1968 with the rank of captain. He was appointed a Commander of the Order of the British Empire in the 1968 Birthday Honours.

== Later life ==
After retirement Baldwin continued to take an interest in naval aviation. He was one of the founders of the Fleet Air Arm Officers' Association and served as its chairman. He wrote letters to The Daily Telegraph advocating the acquisition of the Sea Harrier for the Royal Navy's through-deck cruisers, including the ships of the Invincible-class class.

He was a member of the Press Council from 1973 to 1978 and subsequently served on the Press Council Appointments Commission from 1978 to 1990.

Baldwin died on 11 November 2005, aged 84.
