= RAF Nutts Corner =

Former Royal Air Force station in County Antrim, Northern Ireland

RAF Nutts Corner RNAS Nutts Corner HMS Pintail USAAF Station 235
- Crumlin, County Antrim in Northern Ireland

Site information
- Type: Royal Air Force Station
- Owner: Air Ministry; Admiralty
- Operator: Royal Air Force; Royal Navy
- Controlled by: RAF Coastal Command; Fleet Air Arm
- Condition: Disused

Location
- Shown within Northern Ireland RAF Nutts Corner (the United Kingdom)
- Coordinates: 54°37′52″N 006°09′14″W

Site history
- Built: 1940
- In use: 1941-1946
- Fate: Industry / Leisure / Public road
- Battles/wars: European theatre of World War II

Airfield information
- Elevation: 96 metres (315 ft) AMSL
Runways
Direction	Length and surface
04/22	5,400 ft (1,600 m) Asphalt
10/28	6,000 ft (1,800 m) Asphalt
16/34	3,600 ft (1,100 m) Asphalt

Royal Air Force Nutts Corner, or more simply RAF Nutts Corner, is a former Royal Air Force (RAF) station located 2.7 miles (4.3 km) east of Crumlin, County Antrim, Northern Ireland and 9.2 miles (14.8 km) north west of Belfast.

== Second World War ==
The site was selected for use as a Royal Air Force (RAF) airfield in mid-1940 and within months construction was accorded high priority, enabling No. 120 Squadron RAF flying Consolidated Liberator to begin operations there when the station opened on 2 June 1941. No. 220 Squadron arrived from RAF Wick in January 1942 with Lockheed Hudsons and soon began converting to Boeing Fortress I, flying the first sortie with the type on 29 April before transferring to Ballykelly on 20 June.

As Nutts Corner had been selected as trans-Atlantic reception centre 120 Squadron moved to Ballykelly in July 1942 and the following year the first USAAF United States Army Air Forces Boeing B-17 Flying Fortresses began to arrive. Although the airfield remained under overall RAF control an American presence was established on the airfield in relation to activities involved with ferrying aircraft from the United States and 385 USAAF aircraft (mostly B-17) had passed through the airfield by the end of 1943.

July 1944 saw American activity peak when 372 aircraft arrived that month. The majority of transatlantic deliveries shifted to Prestwick and by the end of 1944 American activity at the airfield was minimal. In July 1945 the airfield began a period of use by the Royal Navy, commissioned as HMS Pintail but was returned to RAF control in April 1946.

The following Royal Air Force squadrons and units were here at some point:

Squadrons
- No. 44 Squadron RAF
- No. 120 Squadron RAF
- No. 160 Squadron RAF
- No. 220 Squadron RAF
- No. 231 Squadron RAF

Units

- No. 104 (Transport) Operational Training Unit RAF (March 1943 - February 1944)
- No. 1332 (Transport) Heavy Conversion Unit RAF (October 1944 - April 1945)
- No. 1674 Heavy Conversion Unit RAF (February - March 1944)

=== Royal Navy ===
RAF Nutts Corner was transferred on loan to the Admiralty from RAF Northern Ireland and known as Royal Naval Air Station Nutts Corner, (RNAS Nutts Corner). It was used to provide accommodation for Fleet Air Arm first-line fighter squadrons. On 11 July 1945 it commissioned as HMS Pintail.

List of Fleet Air Arm first and second line squadrons, Royal Naval Air Station flight and other Royal Navy flying units based at this location:

- 4th Naval Fighter Wing
- 772 Naval Air Squadron
- 802 Naval Air Squadron
- 803 Naval Air Squadron
- 807 Naval Air Squadron
- 809 Naval Air Squadron
- 879 Naval Air Squadron
- 883 Naval Air Squadron
- 891 Naval Air Squadron
- 1835 Naval Air Squadron
- 1837 Naval Air Squadron
- 1852 Naval Air Squadron

On 14 November 1945 the airbase was put to Care & Maintenance status, 'on books of HMS Gadwall'. RNAS Nutts Corner finally paid off 1 April 1946 and was returned to RAF Northern Ireland control.

== After the war ==
On 1 December 1946 civil air operations were transferred from HMS Gadwall/Belfast Harbour Airport (now the George Best Belfast City Airport) to Nutts Corner due to the longer runways available at that airfield. Other reasons included the limited space available at Belfast for expansion and the danger associated with obstacles such as the cranes around Belfast harbour. Other sites were studied as possible alternative civil airports including RAF Long Kesh and Lisburn. The advantage of choosing Nutts Corner was the large amount of existing hardstanding which was necessary for civil aircraft movements. The former RAF station then became known as Belfast-Nutts Corner Airport.

By the end of the 1950s the steep approach necessary for aircraft flying to Nutts Corner was deemed unsuitable. This was due to the location of the airport, close to the Belfast mountains and the obstacles located there, particularly transmitters and aerials. Another factor was the fact that of Nutts Corner's three runways, only one was suitable for modern aircraft. Aldergrove's two runways set at 100 degrees (07-25 and 17-35) to each other made operations possible even if conditions (particularly wind) changed dramatically. The decision to restore civil flights to Aldergrove was taken in July 1959. The move was made official in September 1963 and a month later the present terminal was opened.

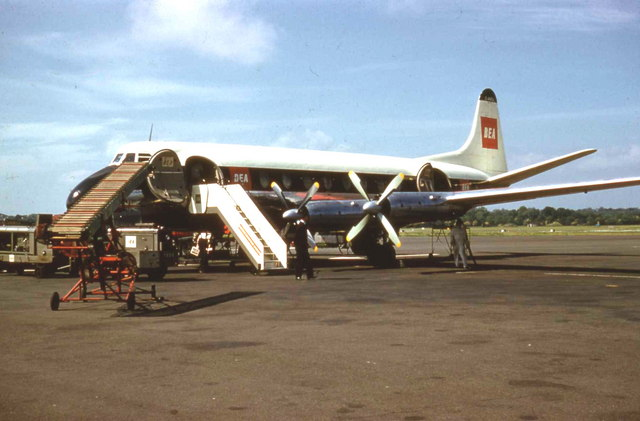
A British European Airways, Vickers Viscount at Nutts Corner Airport in 1960

== Current use ==
A section of the A26 Moira Road, running from Nutts Corner Roundabout for approximately 2 km, is constructed on one of the old runways. The airfield was used from 1984 to 2004 for events such as the Irish Superbike Championships and Rallycross, but it was restricted due to noise complaints from local residents. A small section of the circuit continues to be used by the Northern Ireland Karting Club (NIKA) and the Ulster Karting Club. The site is also used for a weekly market and a model aircraft club is on the site.

== Accidents and incidents ==
- On 18 February 1942 a Liberator bomber which was leaving for an Atlantic patrol failed to gain height, struck a radio mast and crashed. Six of the crew survived but four were killed.
- On 21 August 1942, the First World War air ace Harry King Goode was killed on a demonstration flight with a 120 Squadron Consolidated Liberator stationed at the base.
- On 27 March 1951 a Douglas Dakota 3 cargo aircraft operated by Air Transport Charter and en route from Ringway Airport, Manchester, crashed shortly after take-off following failure to gain height. There were four fatalities, two of the three crew on board and two of the three passengers. The subsequent investigation found that the crash resulted from a loss of engine power caused by ice formation in the carburetor intakes attributable to the captain's failure to make use of the heat controls. An extended undercarriage and the presence of snow on the wings may have also been contributory factors.
- Nutts Corner was the site of the worst air disaster in Ireland, when on 5 January 1953 a British European Airways (BEA) Vickers Viking crashed after striking landing lights and then a building at the airfield, killing 27 people out of 35 on board.
- On 23 October 1957 a Vickers Viscount of BEA crashed at the airport, killing all seven on board.

== See also ==
- List of former Royal Air Force stations
