= 879 Naval Air Squadron =

Inactive flying squadron of the Royal Navy's Fleet Air Arm

- Squadron badge
- Active: 1942–1946
- Disbanded: 7 January 1946
- Country: United Kingdom
- Branch: Royal Navy
- Type: Single-seat fighter squadron
- Role: Fleet fighter squadron
- Part of: Fleet Air Arm
- Home station: See Naval air stations section for full list.
- Mottos: Si vis defendere oppugna (Latin for 'Attack is the best means of defence')
- Engagements: World War II: Operation Avalanche; Operation Dragoon; Operation Outing
- Battle honours: Salerno 1943; South of France 1944; Aegean 1944

Insignia
- Squadron Badge Description: White, a peregrine falcon reguardant proper perched upon a portcullis black ( 1943)
- Identification Markings: AA+, later D4A+ Seafire

Aircraft flown
- Fighter: Fairey Fulmar; Supermarine Spitfire; Supermarine Seafire

879 Naval Air Squadron (879 NAS), also known as 879 Squadron, is an inactive Fleet Air Arm (FAA) naval air squadron of the United Kingdom's Royal Navy (RN). It was last active during the Second World War and from 1943 was equipped with Supermarine Seafire fighters.

It was formed in 1942, and first flew Fairey Fulmar, these followed with Supermarine Spitfire. Operating mainly in the Mediterranean Sea, it took part in the Allied landings at Salerno, Italy in 1943 and Operation Dragoon, the Allied invasion of southern France. It was disbanded in 1946.

== Service ==
879 Squadron was formed on 1 October 1942 at RNAS St Merryn when it was split from 809 Squadron. It was a carrier-based fighter squadron equipped with Fairey Fulmar two-seat fighters. The squadron moved to Old Sarum Airfield in November that year and carried training on army support operations, before moving to RNAS Stretton in March 1943 for re-equipping with Supermarine Seafire Ib fighters. More army-co-operation training followed at RAF Andover in June, with the squadron re-equipping with new Seafire L.IIcs.

The squadron deployed aboard the escort carrier Attacker in July 1943, forming an all Seafire airwing aboard Attacker with 886 Squadron when the carrier sailed for the Mediterranean on 3 August 1943. In September 1943, Attacker took part in the Allied landings at Salerno, Italy, the carrier's Seafires providing fighter cover for the landings. The squadron flew 75 patrols over the beachhead, claiming one Focke-Wulf Fw 190 fighter damaged. After the end of her duties off Salerno, Attacker returned to Britain for refit, with 879 Squadron disembarking. Further training followed, with the squadron strength increasing to 20 Seafires in February 1944.

In April 1944, the squadron again embarked on Attacker, this time as the sole embarked squadron, with the carrier sailing for the Mediterranean in May. When Attacker arrived in the Mediterranean, the squadron was split up, with some detachments at Gibraltar and Blida, and others to Italy where they were attached to squadrons of the Desert Air Force, including 4 Squadron SAAF, carrying out bombing and reconnaissance operations in support of the army. The squadron re-embarked on Attacker at the end of July 1944, and from 15 August took part in Operation Dragoon, the Allied invasion of southern France, providing air cover for the landings, carrying out ground attack and reconnaissance operations, with the squadron having several pilots specially trained in reconnaissance operations attached. The squadron had flown 193 operational missions by the time Attacker withdrew on 23 August.

From 14 September, Attacker took part in Operation Outing, an offensive by the Royal Navy against German forces in the Aegean Sea, with 879 Squadron's Seafires carrying out armed reconnaissance and attack operations, continuing with similar operations over the Aegean through September and October, and covering amphibious landings on Mytilene and Piskopi as the Germans retreated from the Aegean. The squadron disembarked at Dekheila in Egypt in December 1944, not re-embarking on Attacker until April 1945, when the carrier was on passage to Ceylon to join the East Indies Fleet. The squadron flew operations over the Malay Peninsula shortly before VJ-Day, but returned to Britain on Attacker, disembarking on 10 November 1945 and disbanding at RNAS Nutts Corner (HMS Pintail) in Northern Ireland on 7 January 1946.

== Aircraft operated ==
The squadron has operated a number of different aircraft types, including:

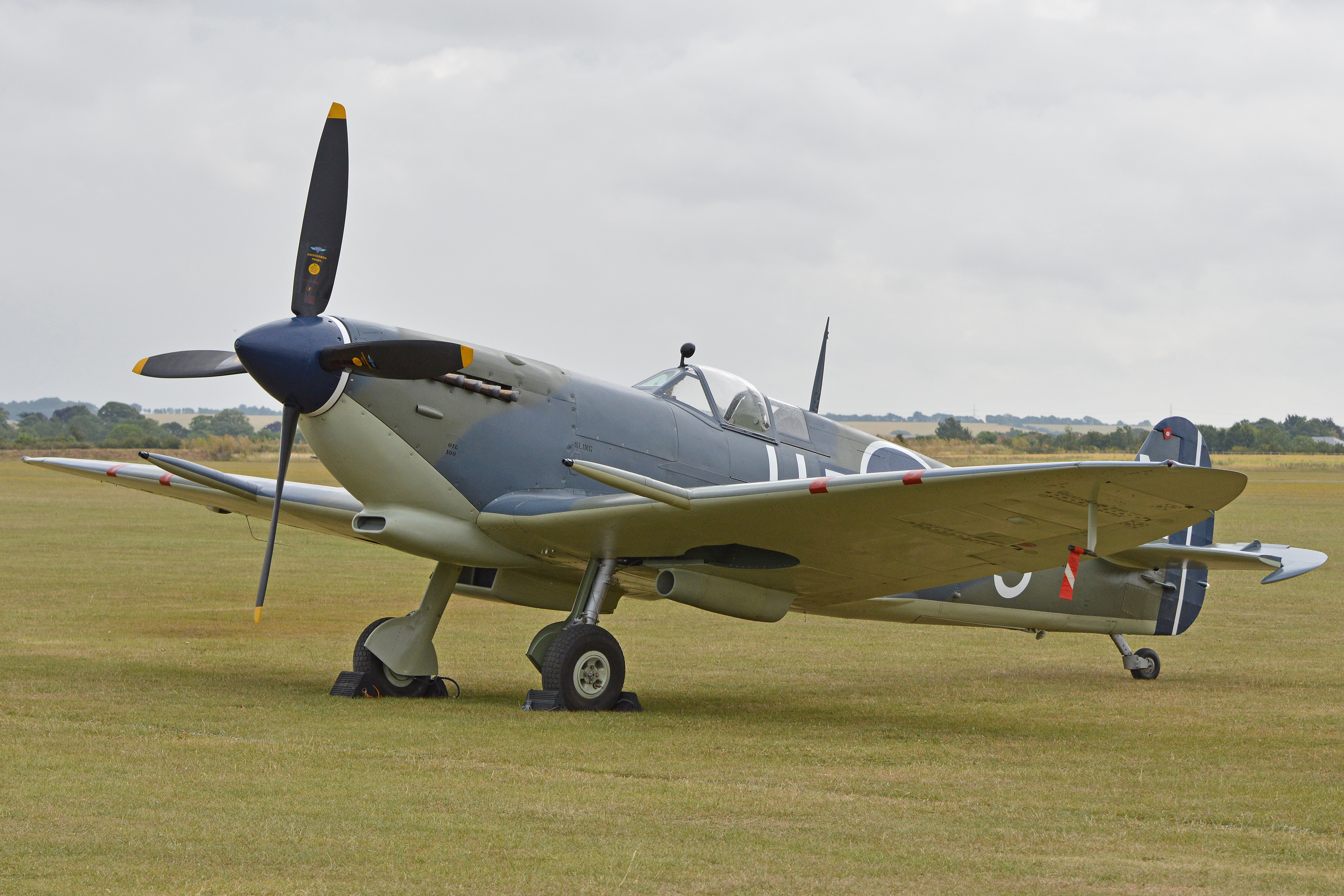
Supermarine Seafire L Mk.III

- Fairey Fulmar Mk.II reconnaissance/fighter aircraft (October 1942 - March 1943)
- Supermarine Spitfire Mk Va fighter aircraft (March - May 1943)
- Supermarine Spitfire Mk Vb/hooked fighter aircraft (March - May 1943)
- Supermarine Seafire Mk.Ib fighter aircraft (March - June 1943)
- Supermarine Seafire L Mk.IIc/LR Mk.IIc fighter aircraft (June 1943 - November 1945)
- Supermarine Seafire L Mk.III fighter aircraft (March 1944 - November 1945)
- Supermarine Seafire F Mk.XVII fighter aircraft (November 1945 - January 1946)

== Battle honours ==
The battle honours awarded to 879 Naval Air Squadron are:

- Salerno 1943
- South of France 1944
- Aegean 1944

== Naval air stations and aircraft carriers ==
879 Naval Air Squadron operated from a number of naval air stations of the Royal Navy, and Royal Air Force stations in the UK and overseas, and also a number of Royal Navy escort carriers and other airbases overseas:

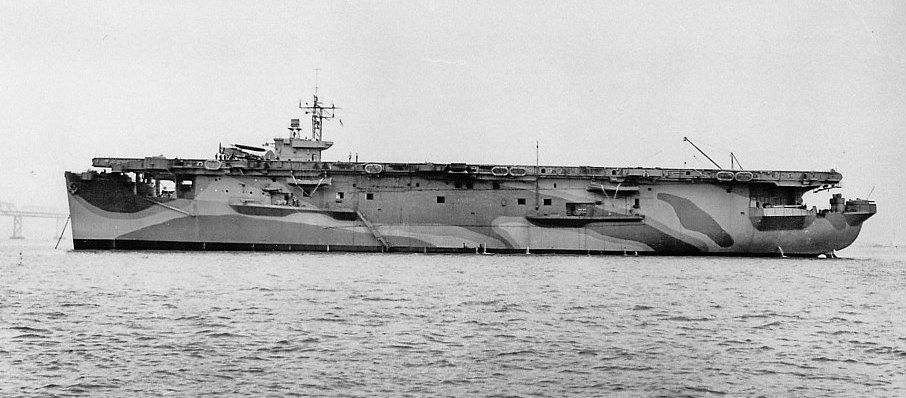
HMS Attacker

- Royal Naval Air Station St Merryn (HMS Vulture), Cornwall, (1 - 10 October 1942)
- Royal Naval Air Station Charlton Horethorne (HMS Heron II), Somerset, (10 October - 18 November 1942)
- Royal Air Force Old Sarum, Wiltshire, (18 November 1942 - 22 March 1943)
- Royal Naval Air Station Stretton (HMS Blackcap), Cheshire, (22 March - 26 April 1943)
- Royal Air Force Dundonald, South Ayrshire, (26 April - 1 May 1943)
- Royal Naval Air Station Stretton (HMS Blackcap), Cheshire, (1 May - 17 June 1943)
- Royal Naval Air Station Yeovilton (HMS Heron), Somerset, (17 June - 8 July 1943)
- Royal Naval Air Station Machrihanish (HMS Landrail), Argyll and Bute, (8 - 30 July 1943)
- HMS Attacker (30 July - 6 October 1943)
- Royal Air Force Andover, Hampshire, (6 October - 29 November 1943)
- Royal Naval Air Station Burscough (HMS Ringtail), Lancashire, (29 November - 9 December 1943)
- Royal Air Force Andover, Hampshire, (9 - 19 December 1943)
- Royal Naval Air Station Burscough (HMS Ringtail), Lancashire, (19 - 30 December 1943)
- HMS Attacker (30 December 1943 - 6 February 1944)
- Royal Naval Air Station Burscough (HMS Ringtail), Lancashire, (6 February - 16 March 1944)
- HMS Attacker (16 - 24 March 1944)
- Royal Air Force Long Kesh, Lisburn, (24 March - 30 April 1944)
- HMS Attacker (30 April - 23 July 1944)
  - RN Air Section Gibraltar, Gibraltar, (Detachments 24 May - 5 June 1944)
  - Blida, Algeria, (half squadron 17 June - 22 July 1944)
  - Pomigliano, Italy, (Detachment 22–25 June 1944)
  - Capodichino, Italy, (Detachment 22–26 June 1944)
  - Orvieto, Italy, (Detachments 25 June - 19 July 1944)
  - Castiglione, Italy, (Detachments 5–18 July 1944)
- HMS Attacker (23 July - 9 November 1944)
  - Mitylene, Lesbos, Greece, (Detachment 26–29 October 1944)
- Royal Naval Air Station Lee-on-Solent (HMS Daedalus), Hampshire, (9 - 27 November 1944)
- HMS Attacker (27 November - 11 December 1944)
- Royal Naval Air Station Dekheila (HMS Grebe), Alexandria, Egypt, (11 December 1944 - 14 April 1945)
  - Royal Air Force Helwan, Greece, (Detachment 3–9 February 1945)
- HMS Attacker (14 - 29 April 1945)
- Royal Naval Air Station Katukurunda (HMS Ukussa), Ceylon, (29 April - 10 June 1945)
- HMS Attacker (10 June - 7 July 1945)
- Royal Naval Air Station Katukurunda (HMS Ukassa), Ceylon, (7 - 10 July 1945)
- HMS Attacker (10 - 19 July 1945)
- Royal Naval Air Station Trincomalee (HMS Bambara), Ceylon, (19 July - 9 August 1945)
  - HMS Hunter (Detachment deck landing training (DLT) 2–6 August 1945)
- HMS Attacker (9 August - 19 September 1945)
- Royal Naval Air Station Trincomalee (HMS Bambarra), Ceylon, (19 September - 10 October 1945)
- HMS Attacker (10 October - 10 November 1945)
- Royal Naval Air Station Nutts Corner (HMS Pintail), County Antrim, (10 November 1945 - 7 January 1945)
- disbanded - (7 January 1946)

== Commanding officers ==
List of commanding officers of 879 Naval Air Squadron:

- Lieutenant(A) R.J.H. Grose, RNVR, from 1 October 1942
- Lieutenant S.F.F. Shotton, RNR, from 17 October 1942
- Lieutenant Commander(A) R.J.H. Grose, RNVR, from 15 January 1943
- Lieutenant Commander(A) D.G. Carlisle, SANF(V), from 7 October 1943
- Lieutenant Commander P.E.I. Bailey, RN, from 28 October 1944
- Lieutenant J.M. Howden, RNZNVR, from 4 March 1945
- Lieutenant Commander(A) B.H. Harriss, RN, from 7 May 1945
- disbanded - 7 January 1946

Note: Abbreviation (A) signifies Air Branch of the RN or RNVR.
