= 1957 Nutts Corner BEA Viscount crash =

Airplane crash in Northern Ireland

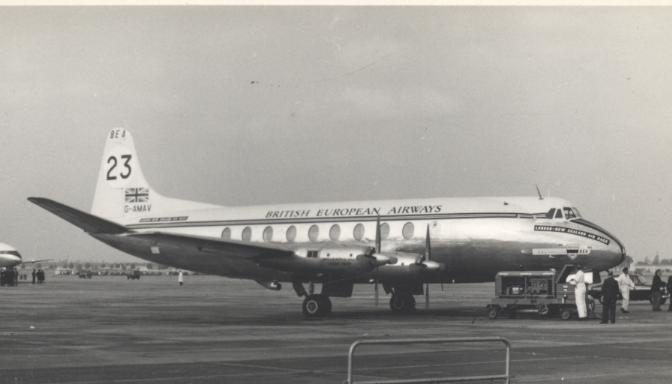
- A Vickers Viscount 802 similar to the accident aircraft, in later British European Airways livery.

Accident
- Date: 23 October 1957
- Summary: Undetermined
- Site: Belfast, Nutts Corner, Northern Ireland, United Kingdom; 54°37′41″N 6°10′26″W

Aircraft
- Aircraft type: Vickers Viscount 802
- Operator: British European Airways
- Registration: G-AOJA
- Flight origin: London Heathrow Airport, England, United Kingdom
- Destination: Nutts Corner, Northern Ireland, United Kingdom
- Passengers: 2
- Crew: 5
- Fatalities: 7
- Injuries: 0
- Survivors: 0

The 1957 Nutts Corner BEA Viscount crash was a British European Airways (BEA) flight from London to Belfast that crashed at Nutts Corner Airport on 23 October 1957, killing all seven passengers and crew.

== Aircraft ==
The aircraft was a Vickers Viscount 802, registration G-AOJA, built and delivered to BEA the previous year. It was the first 800 Series Viscount built and was used by the manufacturer Vickers-Armstrongs for test and promotional flights prior to delivery.

== Accident ==
On the afternoon of the accident the aircraft took off from London Heathrow Airport at 15:16 GMT on a non-scheduled positioning flight to Nutts Corner Airport in Belfast, Northern Ireland, where it was due to pick up the UK government Minister of Supply Aubrey Jones and a group of journalists, who had been attending the opening of a research building for Short & Harland Ltd in Belfast. An hour-and-a-half later, with low cloud and rain at Nutts Corner, the aircraft commenced its approach to land from the east on runway 28. As the aircraft neared the runway it veered right of the runway centreline. Less than 3/4 mile (1.2 km) from the eastern end of the runway the crew carried out a go-around, but the aircraft crashed about 1,000 feet (300 m) to the left of the far end of the runway. The accident killed all five crew and the two passengers (a BEA official and his wife) on board, and the aircraft was destroyed.

== Investigation and cause ==
A public inquiry was convened to investigate the accident, during which it emerged that the airport's approach lighting system may have been switched off at the time of the aircraft's landing attempt. The inquiry also heard evidence regarding a bent screwdriver that had been found in the wreckage, but as this had been removed by an airport worker before its position in the wreckage had been recorded, the likelihood of the object jamming the flight controls could not be assessed. At the conclusion of the inquiry, while it made recommendations regarding the security of aircraft crash sites and tool control during maintenance, and suggested that records be kept of when airport approach lighting was switched on or off, no official cause of the accident was determined.
