= 807 Naval Air Squadron =

Inactive flying squadron of the Royal Navy's Fleet Air Arm

- Squadron badge
- Active: 1940–1951; 1951–1953; 1954–1955; 1958–1962
- Disbanded: 15 May 1962
- Country: United Kingdom
- Branch: Royal Navy
- Type: Single-seat fighter squadron
- Role: Carrier-based fighter squadron
- Part of: Fleet Air Arm
- Mottos: Quoquo versus fenturi (Latin for 'Ready to Strike in all directions')
- Aircraft: See Aircraft flown section for full list.
- Engagements: World War II; Korean War
- Battle honours: Atlantic 1941; Malta Convoys 1941-42; North Africa 1942-43; Sicily 1943; Salerno 1943; South France 1944; Aegean 1944; Burma 1945; Malaya 1945; Korea 1950-53

Insignia
- Squadron Badge Description: Barry wavy of fourteen white and blue, seven daggers proper pommels and hilts conjoined in the centre gold (1944)
- Identification Markings: 6A+ (Fulmar); single letters (Seafire II/III to August 1943); 8A+ (Seafire II/III on Battler); HA+ (Seafire II/III from January 1944 on Hunter); D5A+ (Seafire II/III June 1944); single letters (Seafire F.17); 113-130 (Sea Fury); 131-151 (Sea Fury May 1951); 101-107 (Sea Fury December 1954); 121-130 (Sea Hawk); 190-199 (Scimitar)
- Fin Carrier Codes: T (Sea Fury); O (Sea Fury May 1951); Z (Sea Hawk); R:C (Scimitar)

807 Naval Air Squadron (807 NAS) sometimes referred to as 807 Squadron, is an inactive Fleet Air Arm (FAA) naval air squadron of the United Kingdom’s Royal Navy (RN). It last operated the Supermarine Scimitar F.1 naval strike fighter aircraft between October 1958 and May 1962 and was last deployed on the light fleet carrier HMS Centaur.

Formed in September 1940 and operating as a carrier-based fighter squadron, it served throughout the Second World War operating with Fairey Fulmar initially and then transitioning to Supermarine Seafire, the first FAA squadron to do so. During the Korean War, it flew Hawker Sea Fury and then later the Hawker Sea Hawk.

== History ==
=== Second World War (1939-1945) ===
==== Formation ====
807 Naval Air Squadron was formed at RNAS Worthy Down (HMS Kestrel), Hampshire, in September 1940, as a Fleet Fighter Squadron equipped with nine Fairey Fulmar Mk.I, a British carrier-based reconnaissance/fighter aircraft. Three were embarked in the fighter catapult ship HMS Pegasus, where they remained until February 1941, when the entire squadron embarked in the Courageous-class battlecruiser, modified as an aircraft carrier, HMS Furious, for convoy duties.

==== Ark Royal ====
In April 1941, 807 Naval Air Squadron was re-equipped with Fairey Fulmar Mk.II aircraft and subsequently joined the Royal Navy's latest aircraft carrier HMS Ark Royal, participating in the defence of the Malta convoys from July to September. Together with 808 Naval Air Squadron, they engaged and destroyed fifteen Axis aircraft. Many of the squadron's aircraft were lost when HMS Ark Royal was torpedoed and sunk by the U-81 on 13 November 1941. Four aircraft were flown to RN Air Section Gibraltar, located at RAF North Front, Gibraltar. The surviving aircraft from 808 Naval Air Squadron were flown from HMS Ark Royal before the carrier sank and on arrival in Gibraltar were absorbed into 807 Naval Air Squadron.

==== Mediterranean ====
The squadron was gradually re-equipped with replacement Fairey Fulmar aircraft, which were also joined by two Hawker Sea Hurricane fighter aircraft, after which the squadron joined the aircraft carrier HMS Argus. In June 1942 the squadron flew off the carriers HMS Argus and HMS Eagle to cover Operation Harpoon, The Battle of Pantelleria, a Malta re supply convoy. It lost five Fairey Fulmars but accounted for four Italian aircraft.

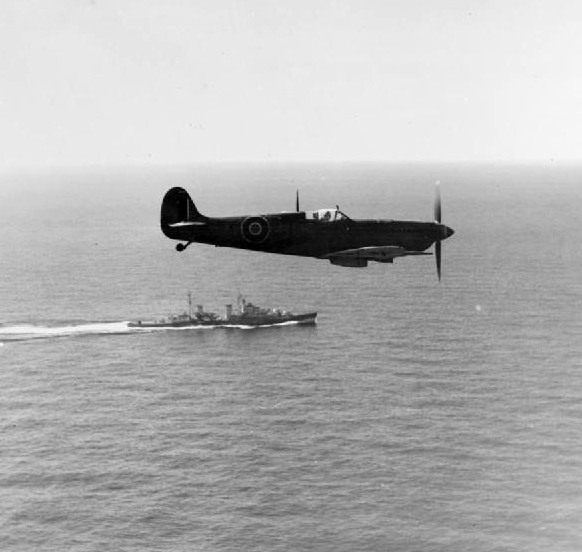
A Seafire of 807 Squadron

The Supermarine Seafires were first deployed in the Fleet Air Arm (FAA) with 807 Squadron in June 1942. In 1941, the choice was made to utilise the Supermarine Spitfire for carrier-based operations with the Fleet Air Arm (FAA). Trials were conducted using a modified Spitfire Mk.Vb that had been fitted with an arrester hook. Efforts then progressed to convert Spitfires into Seafires before the actual production of Seafires. The initial conversions from Spitfire VBs were designated as the Seafire Mk.Ib.

Initially equipped with the Seafire Mk.Ib, the squadron re-embarked in HMS Furious, arriving in time to engage in Operation Torch, the Allied invasion of North Africa, in November 1942. This operation marked the inaugural involvement of Seafires and represented the largest naval engagement of the war up to that point. The Seafires commenced operations at dawn on 8 November, providing escort for a strike force that conducted low-altitude assaults on enemy airfields. During the ensuing dogfight, Sub-lieutenant G.C. Baldwin, DSC, piloting a Seafire Mk.IIc (MA986) from 807 Squadron, succeeded in downing one of the Vichy-French Dewoitine D.520 fighters, marking the first aerial victory attributed to a Seafire. The CO was hit by flak and forced landed in the desert. He was taken prisoner but rescued by American troops and returned to the squadron.

By March 1943 the squadron was back in the UK and by May it had been assigned to the Illustrious class fleet carrier HMS Indomitable and provided cover for the Allied invasion of Sicily, Operation Husky. HMS Indomitable was damaged by a torpedo in July, causing 807 Naval Air Squadron to transfer to the Attacker-class escort carrier HMS Battler, from which they supported Operation Avalanche, the Allied invasion of Italy. The squadron returned to Britain aboard sister ship HMS Hunter, subsequently joining the 4th Naval Fighter Wing.

Elements of the squadron were lent to the Desert Air Force serving in Italy for several weeks in April 1944, with the entire squadron flying off HMS Hunter to support Operation Dragoon, the landings in the South of France in August 1944. During the 13-days of Operation Dragoon, 807 Naval Air Squadron accomplished a total of 485.10 flying hours across 307 sorties, which included thirty-six dive bombing missions, fifty-six armed reconnaissance missions, ninety-six force cover missions, forty-eight beach cover missions, sixteen tactical reconnaissance missions, and fifty-five spotting missions. This resulted in the loss of four aircraft and eleven deck landing incidents. Tragically, two pilots lost their lives, one was reported missing, and another sustained serious injuries.

==== East Indies fleet ====
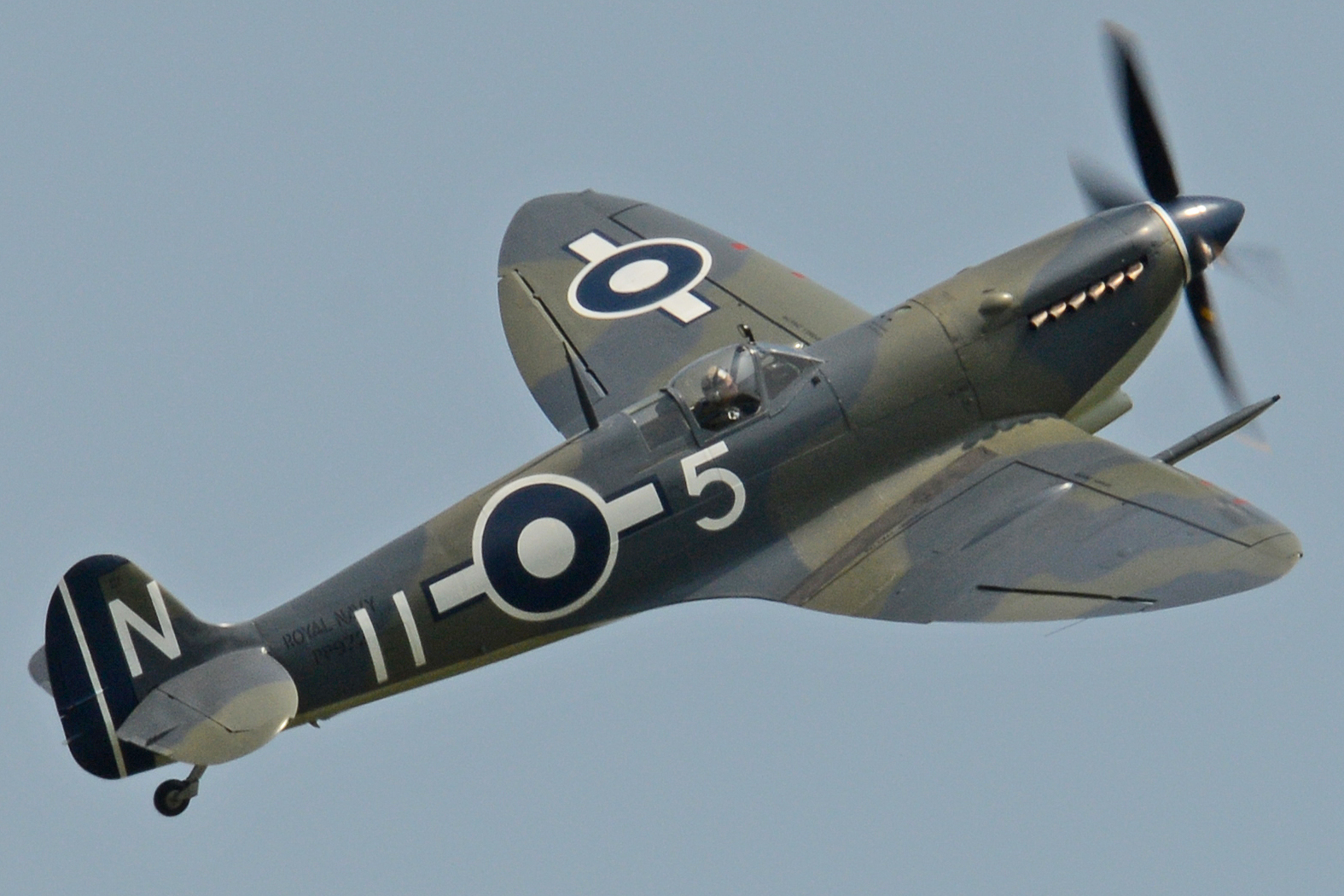
A Seafire LF.IIIc; an example of the type used by 807 Squadron from June 1944

In March 1945 the squadron joined the Eastern Fleet aboard HMS Hunter and provided cover during the re-occupation of Rangoon. In early March, 807 naval air squadron re-embarked from RNAS Dekheila (HMS Grebe), Alexandria, Egypt, prior to the escort carrier's entry into the Suez Canal. HMS Hunter reached Ceylon in late March, at which point 807 disembarked to RNAS Katukurunda (HMS Ukussa), Ceylon. The squadron dedicated the subsequent month to preparations for Operation Dracula, the sea-borne assault on Rangoon. The squadron re-embarked in HMS Hunter and on the morning of 1 May, it commenced launching pairs of Seafires for low convoy cover, with 807 completing sixteen sorties throughout the day. The next day, designated 'D-Day', twenty-four sorties were executed, comprising four fighter-bomber and twenty Low Beach Cover missions. Following the operation the carrier docked at Trincomalee on 9 May.

Subsequent to this, there were assaults on Japanese vessels in the Andaman Sea. The Japanese cruiser Haguro was in the process of evacuating troops from the Nicobar and Andaman Islands to Singapore. HMS Hunter, with 807, was included in the contingent assigned to intercept the Japanese evacuation, which were later designated as Operation Mitre, and to pursue the Haguro under the operation name Operation Dukedom. Following these events, air strikes were conducted on the Andaman Islands on 16 May, during which the fleet faced nearly continuous aerial assaults, and the Seafire CAP aircraft from 807 were actively engaged in pursuing radar contacts.

After V-J Day, the carrier arrived in Singapore on 10 September and following the Japanese surrender signing, the vessel departed for home on 9 October. Upon returning, the squadron was re-equipped with twelve Supermarine Seafire F Mk.XVIIs and the majority of 1946 was dedicated to training. In May 1947, they boarded the Colossus-class light fleet carrier HMS Vengeance for a cruise to Norway.

=== Sea Fury (1947-1954) ===
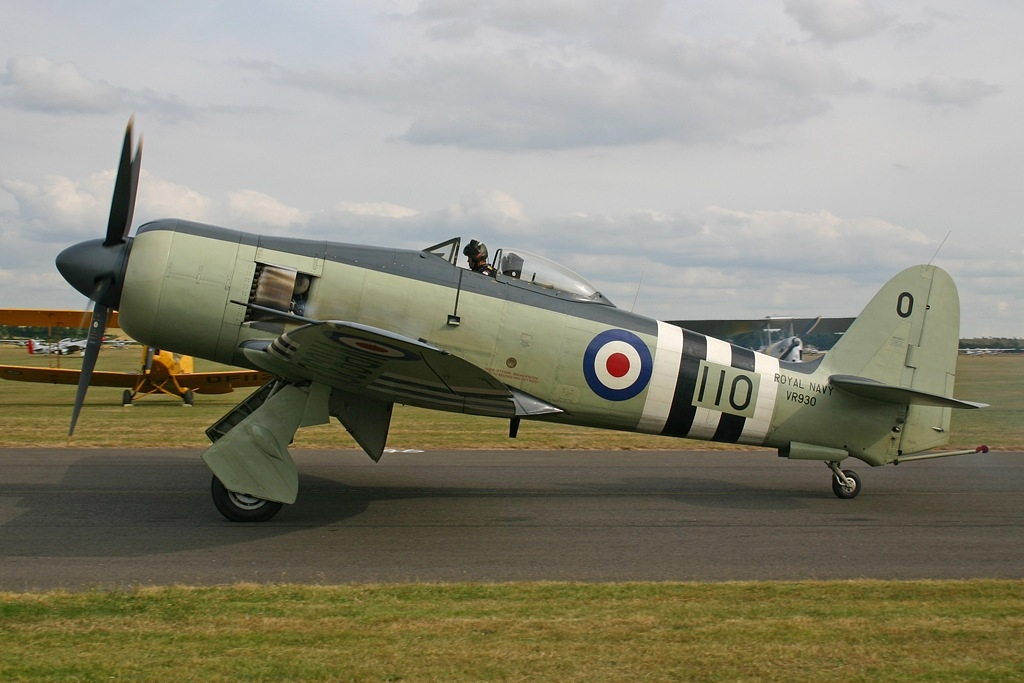
A Sea Fury FB.11; an example of the type used by 807 Squadron

In September 1947, 807 Squadron was re-equipped with twelve Sea Fury F.10 fighter aircraft. The Hawker Sea Fury represented the final piston-engine fighter utilised by the Fleet Air Arm in front-line squadrons, operating from 1947 to 1955. It was notable for being the first British naval aircraft to feature power-folding wings in regular service. The Sea Fury commenced its operational service in the late summer of 1947, 807 being one of the inaugural squadrons to receive the type.

Subsequently, the squadron became part of the 17th Carrier Air Group at RNAS Eglinton (HMS Gannet), County Londonderry, in October After a transition to Sea Fury FB.11s, the squadron embarked a year later on the Colossus-class aircraft carrier HMS Theseus for a visit to South Africa. This visit included a period of disembarkation that featured an eight-day tour around the country alongside 802 Squadron.

In September 1950, the carrier arrived in the Far East, where the squadron quickly became engaged in operations in Korean waters the following month, completing 264 operational sorties during the October alone. Subsequently, the Air Group was honored with The Boyd Trophy for 1950 in recognition of its accomplishments. Upon returning to the UK in May, the squadron disbanded.

=== Sea Hawk (1954-1955) ===
In January 1954, the reforming process commenced with the re-introduction of Sea Furies, although these were withdrawn at RNAS Anthorn (HMS Nuthatch), Cumbria, and were followed by the arrival of twelve Sea Hawk F.2 jet aircraft at RNAS Brawdy (HMS Goldcrest), Pembrokeshire, in May. The Hawker Sea Hawk jet fighter was first introduced to FAA squadrons in 1953, taking the place of the Sea Fury. The F2 fighter variant had its maiden flight on 21 February 1954, while the FGA 4 variant, which was specifically designed for close air support operations, made its first flight on 26 August 1954.

The F1s were partially exchanged for FB 3s in November, resulting in a reduced operational strength of nine aircraft. The work-up concluded with a two-week period aboard the Centaur class light fleet carrier HMS Bulwark in February 1955. Subsequently, in March, the last F 2 was retired as FGA 4s began to be delivered. In July, 807 squadron embarked in the sister ship HMS Albion and set sail for the Mediterranean. However, after participating in various exercises, the squadron returned home and was disbanded upon reaching HMNB Portsmouth on 4 November.

=== Scimitar (1958-1962) ===
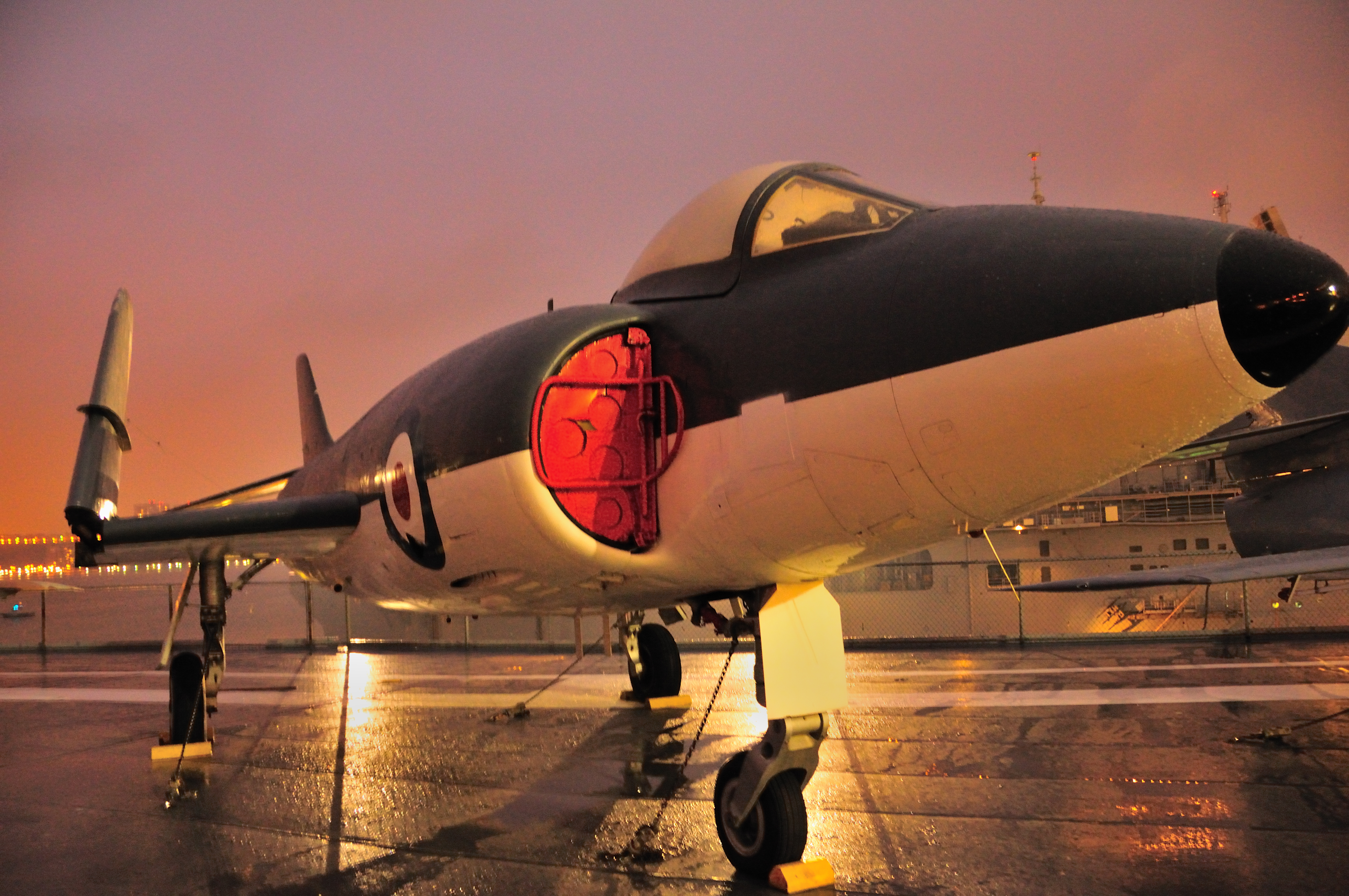
A Scimitar F.1; an example of the type used by 807 Squadron

807 Squadron was the second operational unit to receive the Scimitar F.1 and re-formed at RNAS Lossiemouth (HMS Fulmar), Moray, on 1 October 1958, under the command of Lieutenant Commander K.A. Leppard, RN. The Supermarine Scimitar was the first swept-wing, single-seat fighter introduced by the FAA, signifying a major milestone as the first aircraft in the FAA to reach supersonic speeds. Furthermore, it was the first aircraft used by the FAA that had the ability to carry an atomic bomb.

The squadron engaged in an exercise from 16 to 18 October, despite having only four Scimitars in service at that time. Throughout the rest of 1959, the squadron primarily operated from their home base, although they conducted detachments to RAF West Freugh, Dumfries and Galloway, from 27 to 29 January and from 7 to 9 July, as well as to RNAS Yeovilton (HMS Heron), Somerset, from 9 to 12 of June. Additionally, they participated in flying displays at RNAS Culdrose (HMS Seahawk), Cornwall, on 25 June and took part in the annual SBAC event at Farnborough, Hampshire, from 2 to 15 of September.

==== Aerobatic displays ====
In September 1959 the squadron performed in front of thousands of spectators at that years Farnborough Airshow with a display of formation aerobatics. The naval aviators began their display with a six stream take-off to form a four aircraft aerobatic team and two soloists. One of the singletons performed a target banner pick up using an extension fitted to its deck arrestor hook. Meanwhile, the four aircraft formation returned for a transonic pass at 700 mph followed by a short aerobatic display devised by Keith Leppard.

Included in this sequence was what the Naval commentator described as an 'original manoeuvre', a fast pass in open box formation with a rapid individual roll by each Supermarine Scimitar; the Twinkle Roll was created. The two singletons touched down from the left and immediately folded their wings whilst one aircraft from the other four detached and approached from the right, landing head on between them.

==== Ship-based service ====
On 10 November 1959, Lieutenant N. Grier-Rees, RN, carried out a successful ejection from a Scimitar when his flying controls locked. The squadron finally embarked in the Audacious-class aircraft carrier HMS Ark Royal on 3 March 1960 where it remained for the next year, taking part in major exercises in the Mediterranean and later carrying out cold weather trials in the Arctic Circle.

In April 1961, 807 transferred from HMS Ark Royal, to the lead ship of her class HMS Centaur. Scimitar operations from this ship proved difficult due to her small size and slower speed than HMS Ark Royal, resulting in restrictions on launch and recovery weights. This prevented them from being used to their limits; problems that became more acute in tropical climates with little or no natural wind.

Following an additional period in the Mediterranean, the carrier proceeded to the Persian Gulf, where it conducted patrols off the coast of Kuwait amid a political crisis. Arriving in Aden in early July, HMS Centaur set sail once more on the 21 and ultimately reached the Persian Gulf to take over from HMS Victorious on 31. In this region, the Scimitars of 807 Squadron conducted patrols along the Kuwaiti coast. However, HMS Centaur's stay in the area was brief, as it subsequently proceeded towards the Mediterranean, passing through Suez on the 20 August, prior to 807’s Scimitars departing for RNAS Hal Far (HMS Falcon), Malta, on 27.

Before leaving for the Far East in October 1961 the aircraft were modified to carry AIM-9 Sidewinder air-to-air missiles and AGM-12 Bullpup air-to-ground missiles. The latter were command guided by a joystick in the cockpit of the launching aircraft. Flight refuelling capability was also added at this time. On 21 October 1961 Lieutenant P.M. Hessey fired the first successful live Sidewinder from a British aircraft when he destroyed a meteor target aircraft over the Aberporth Ranges.

Following a period spent in the Mediterranean, the carrier reached Mombasa on 1 December, where the squadron stayed for Christmas while the carrier was undergoing maintenance. Subsequently, HMS Centaur departed on 27, and New Year's was celebrated in Aden before arriving in Hong Kong on 17 January 1962. The squadron engaged in exercises in the Far East; however, it set course for home on 19 February, participating in an exercise in early March off the coast of Aden.

Beginning in March, the carrier operated in the Mediterranean for a couple of months. Subsequently, the aircraft were transported from Malta to Lossiemouth. After seven months in the Middle and Far East, 807 Naval Air Squadron disbanded aboard HMS Centaur upon the ship's arrival at Spithead, near Portsmouth on 15 May.

== Aircraft flown ==
The squadron has flown a number of different aircraft types, including:

- Fairey Fulmar Mk.I reconnaissance/fighter aircraft (September 1940 - July 1941)
- Fairey Fulmar Mk.II reconnaissance/fighter aircraft (April - November 1941, November 1941 - June 1942)
- Supermarine Seafire Mk.Ib fighter aircraft (June - September 1942)
- Supermarine Seafire L Mk.IIc fighter aircraft (June 1942 - October 1944)
- Supermarine Seafire L Mk.III fighter aircraft (June 1944 - December 1945)
- Supermarine Seafire F Mk.XVII fighter aircraft (December 1945 - September 1947)
- Supermarine Seafire Mk.III fighter aircraft (September - October 1946)
- Hawker Sea Fury F.10 fighter aircraft (August 1947 - December 1948)
- Hawker Sea Fury FB.11 fighter-bomber (February 1948 - May 1951, July 1951 - November 1953, January - May 1954)
- Hawker Sea Hawk F.2 jet fighter (May 1954 - March 1955)
- Hawker Sea Hawk F.1 jet fighter (September 1954)
- Hawker Sea Hawk FB.3 fighter-bomber (November 1954 - May 1955)
- Hawker Sea Hawk FGA.4 fighter/ground attack aircraft (March - November 1955)
- Supermarine Scimitar F.1 strike fighter (October 1958 - May 1962)

== Battle honours ==
The battle honours awarded to 807 Naval Air Squadron are:

- Atlantic 1941
- Malta Convoys 1941 - 42
- North Africa 1942-43
- Sicily 1943
- Salerno 1943
- South France 1944
- Aegean 1944
- Burma 1945
- Malaya 1945
- Korea 1950-53

== Assignments ==
807 Naval Air Squadron was assigned as needed to form part of a number of larger units:

- 4th Naval Fighter Wing (25 October 1943 - 25 January 1946)
- 17th Carrier Air Group (October 1947 to October 1949, October 1949 to May 1951)

== Commanding officers ==
List of commanding officers of 807 Naval Air Squadron:

1940 - 1951

- Lieutenant Commander(A) J. Sholto-Douglas, RN, from 15 September 1940
- Lieutenant A.B. Fraser-Harris, DSC & Bar, RN, from 15 February 1942
- Lieutenant Commander(A) K. Firth, RNVR, from 13 March 1943
- Lieutenant Commander(A) G.C. Baldwin, DSC, RN, from 25 October 1943
- Lieutenant Commander(A) L.G.C. Recce, RNZNVR, from 3 June 1944
- Lieutenant Commander(A) E.J. Clark, RNVR, from 10 November 1944
- Lieutenant Commander(A) S.J. Hall, DSC, RN, from 15 March 1946
- Lieutenant Commander F.R.A. Turnbull, DSC & Bar, RN, from 20 September 1946
- Lieutenant Commander S.J. Hall, DSC, RN, from 2 February 1947
- Lieutenant Commander W.N. Waller, RN, from 13 April 1948 (KiFA 2 July 1948)
- Lieutenant Commander(A) A.J. Thomson, DSC, RN, from 8 July 1948
- Lieutenant Commander M.P. Gordon-Smith, DSC, RN, from 25 July 1949
- Lieutenant Commander B. Bevans, DSC, RN, from 6 January 1951
- disbanded - 29 May 1951

1951 - 1953

- Lieutenant Commander A.J. Thomson, DSC, RN, from 15 July 1951
- Lieutenant Commander T.L.M. Brander, DSC, RN, from 1 January 1953
- Lieutenant I.J. Brown, RN, from 10 November 1953
- disbanded - 18 December 1953

1954 - 1955

- Lieutenant Commander P.J. Hutton, DSC, RN, from 14 January 1954
- disbanded - 4 November 1955

1958 - 1962

- Lieutenant Commander K.A. Leppard, RN, from 1 October 1958
- Lieutenant Commander W.A. Tofts, AFC, RN, 22 September 1959
- Lieutenant Commander G.A. Rowan-Thomson, RN, from 15 March 1961
- disbanded 15 May 1962

Note: Abbreviation (A) signifies Air Branch of the RN or RNVR.

== See also ==
- Operation Dragoon order of battle
- Task Force 88 - The escort carrier force that supported Operation Dragoon
- Edward Rosebery Anson - Vice Admiral and last captain of HMS Ark Royal, a former 807 Squadron flight leader
- Peter Vanneck - Former 807 Squadron pilot, engineer, stockbroker and politician
- Victor Smith - Senior Royal Australian Navy officer and former 807 Squadron pilot
- Peter Twiss - British test pilot who held the World Air Speed Record in 1956 and former 807 Squadron pilot
- Exercise Grand Slam - 1952 North Atlantic Treaty Organisation (NATO) combined naval training exercises
