= HMS Attacker (D02) =

1942 Attacker-class escort carrier of the Royal Navy

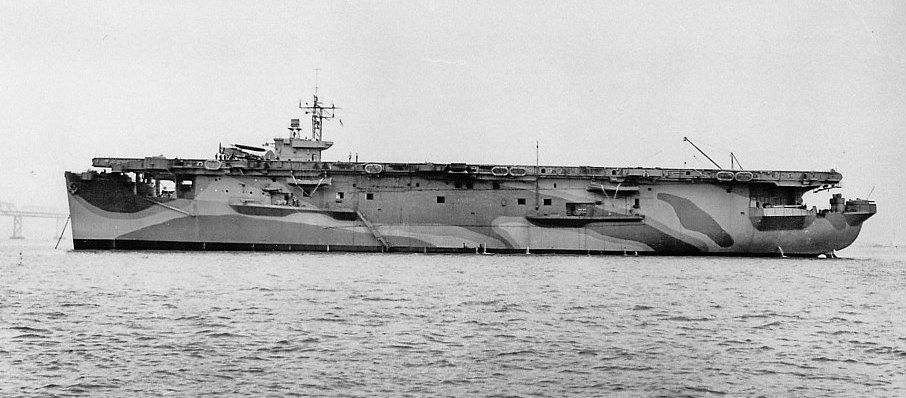
- HMS Attacker (D02) at anchor in San Francisco Bay, 13 November 1942

History

United States
- Name: Steel Artisan; Barnes
- Namesake: Barnes Sound, Florida
- Ordered: as type (C3-S-A1) hull, MC hull 171
- Awarded: 30 September 1940
- Builder: Western Pipe and Steel Company, San Francisco, California
- Cost: $7,992,456
- Yard number: 62
- Way number: 1
- Laid down: 7 April 1941
- Launched: 27 September 1941
- Commissioned: 30 September 1942
- Decommissioned: 30 September 1942
- Reclassified: BACV-7, 20 Aug 1942; CVE, 15 July 1943
- Refit: Converted to AVG, 10 October 1941
- Identification: Hull symbol: AVG-7; BACV-7; CVE-7
- Fate: Allocated to the Royal Navy, 1 March 1942; Transferred to the Royal Navy, 30 September 1942

United Kingdom
- Name: Attacker
- Namesake: One who assaults or assails an opponent
- Acquired: 30 September 1942
- Commissioned: 7 October 1942
- Decommissioned: 29 December 1945
- Identification: Pennant number: D02
- Honours and awards: Atlantic 1943–1944; Salerno 1943; South France 1944; Aegean 1944
- Fate: Returned to the US Navy, 5 January 1946

United States
- Name: Barnes
- Acquired: 5 January 1946
- Stricken: 26 Feb 1946
- Fate: Sold for commercial use, 28 October 1948, scrapped 1980

General characteristics
- Class & type: Bogue-class escort carrier (USA); Attacker-class escort carrier (UK)
- Displacement: 10,200 long tons (10,360 t) (standard); 14,400 long tons (14,630 t) (full load)
- Length: 465 ft (142 m) (wl); 496 ft (151 m) (oa); 440 ft (130 m) (fd)
- Beam: 69 ft 6 in (21.18 m) wl; 82 ft (25 m) (fd); 111 ft 6 in (33.99 m) (extreme width)
- Draught: 23 ft 3 in (7.09 m) (mean); 26 ft (7.9 m) (deep load)
- Installed power: 2 × Foster-Wheeler 285 psi (1,970 kPa) boilers; 8,500 shp (6,300 kW)
- Propulsion: 1 × General Electric or Westinghouse steam turbine; 1 × Screw
- Speed: 18 kn (33 km/h; 21 mph)
- Range: 27,300 nmi (50,600 km; 31,400 mi) at 11 kn (20 km/h; 13 mph)
- Capacity: 3,100 long tons (3,150 t) (fuel oil); 50,000 US gal (190,000 L; 42,000 imp gal) (Avgas)
- Complement: 646
- Armament: 2 × single 5 in (127 mm)/51 caliber gun (removed by RN); 2 × single QF 4 in (100 mm) Mk V dual-purpose guns (installed by RN); 4 × twin 40 mm (1.57 in) Bofors antiaircraft (AA) guns; 8 × twin 20 mm (0.79 in) Oerlikon cannons; 10 × single 20 mm Oerlikon cannons
- Aircraft carried: 24
- Aviation facilities: 1 × hydraulic catapult; 2 × elevators

HMS Attacker (D02) was an American-built escort carrier that served with the Royal Navy during the Second World War. From October 1942 through most of 1943 she served as a convoy escort during the Battle of the Atlantic. In October 1943 modifications were made to turn her into an assault carrier; subsequently she was active in the Mediterranean, and later the war in the Pacific. In late August 1945 Attacker witnessed the Japanese surrender of Penang, in Malaya, as part of Operation Jurist.

== Construction ==
Laid down on 17 April 1941 at the San Francisco yard of Western Pipe and Steel Company as Maritime Commission Hull No. 171, this vessel was originally earmarked for completion as a Type C3-S-A2 freighter, to be named Steel Artisan. She was acquired by the U.S. Navy on 3 September 1941, before completion, and designated for conversion into an Aircraft Escort Vessel. Renamed USS Barnes (AVG-7), she was launched on 27 September 1941, and on 10 October was towed across San Francisco Bay to the Mare Island Navy Yard for conversion. On 1 March 1942 she was selected for transfer to the Royal Navy under Lend-Lease, leading to her being redesignated as BACV-7 on 20 August 1942. Following completion of the conversion, on 30 September 1942 she was commissioned into the US Navy as USS Barnes, sailed back to San Francisco, and then decommissioned and transferred to the Royal Navy, all on the same day. On 7 October 1942 she was commissioned into the Royal Navy as HMS Attacker, under the command of Captain Shirley-Rollison, RN.

== Design and description ==
Attacker was the lead ship in the Royal Navy's 11-ship Attacker-class, the second of three classes of escort carrier built in the United States for the Royal Navy during the Second World War. She had an overall length of 496 ft (151 m), a beam of 69 ft 6 in (21.18 m) and a draught of 24 ft (7.3 m). She displaced 14,400 long tons (14,600 t) at full load. Power was provided by two boilers feeding steam to a steam turbine that drove one shaft, giving 8,500 shp (6,300 kW), which could propel the ship at 18 kn (33 km/h; 21 mph).

Aircraft facilities included a small combined bridge–flight control island, sponsoned off the starboard side far forward; a 450 ft × 120 ft (137 m × 37 m) flight deck, incorporating nine arrestor wires; and beneath this, a hangar measuring 260 ft × 62 ft (79 m × 19 m), with a 42 ft × 34 ft (13 m × 10 m) aircraft lift at each end. The hangar floor retained the sheer of the original main deck of the freighter hull, meaning that getting aircraft to either lift required them to be rolled uphill; this was done with the aid of winches and cables and was difficult even when conditions were optimal.

The ship could support as many as 24 aircraft, with the exact composition of the embarked squadrons depending on the mission; composite squadrons, equipped with both anti-submarine and fighter aircraft, were used for convoy-defence missions, while squadrons working in a strike-carrier role would only be equipped with fighter aircraft. Anti-submarine work was handled by Fairey Swordfish torpedo-bombers, while fighter aircraft, when employed, were Supermarine Seafires.

The ship had a complement of 646 men, who lived in crew accommodation that was significantly different from the arrangements that were normal for the Royal Navy at the time. The separate messes no longer had to prepare their own food, as everything was cooked in the galley and served cafeteria style in a central dining area. They were also equipped with a modern laundry and a barber shop. The traditional hammocks were replaced by three-tier bunk-beds, 18 to a cabin, which were hinged and could be tied up to provide extra space when not in use.

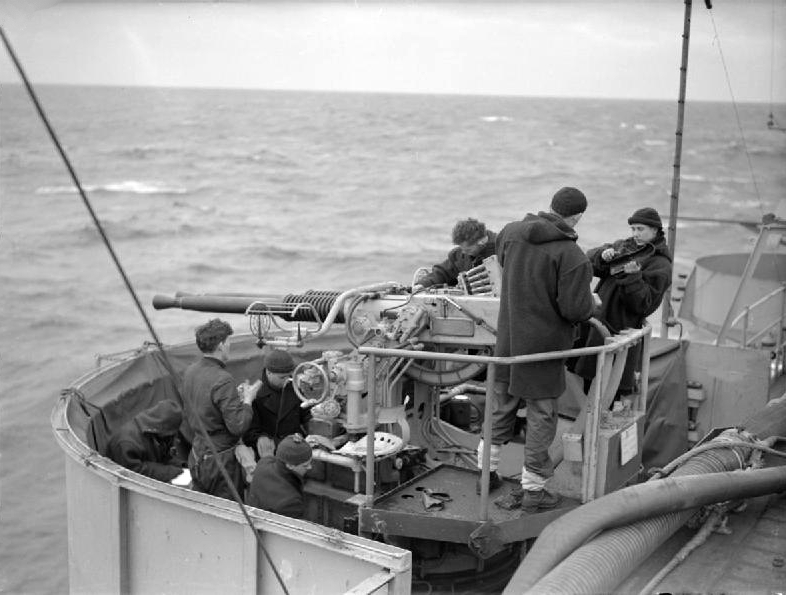
A typical twin 40 mm Bofors anti-aircraft gun mounting on the Attacker-class.

The ship's armament concentrated on anti-aircraft (AA) defence and comprised two QF 4 in (100 mm) MK V dual purpose guns in single mounts, eight 40 mm (1.57 in) Bofors guns in twin mounts and ten 20 mm (0.79 in) Oerlikon cannons in single and eight in twin mounts.

== Service history ==
On 12 November 1942, Attacker started her flying and sea trials off San Francisco. She had embarked four Swordfish I torpedo bombers of 838 squadron from Naval Air Station Alameda. After completion of her trials, and being qualified for duty, she set sail for Balboa, on 12 December, with 838 squadron. She passed through the Panama Canal, and arrived at Cristobal, on 22 December. She later sailed for NAS Quonset Point, where she disembarked 838 squadron, 1 January 1943. Attacker was in Chesapeake Bay, during January, for a period of Deck Landing Training (DLT) with Martlets from 882 squadron, 896 squadron, and 898 squadron and Swordfish from 838 and 840 squadrons.

On 2 March 1943, Attacker set sail for Curacao, with 838 squadron and six Swordfish from 840 squadron, for escort duty with Convoy CU 1. Attacker's first active service in the Atlantic was to provided anti submarine cover during her crossing from the United States to Great Britain. She set sail from Curacao, on 20 March 1943, arriving in Clyde, on 1 April 1943, and Liverpool the following day. On 4 April 1943, in Liverpool, she started two months of modification during which radar was fitted and US 5-inch (130 mm) guns were changed for British ones. On 2 August, she sailed, along with her sister ships Battler, Hunter, and Stalker for Gibraltar, with aircraft from 886 (Seafire fighters and Swordfish torpedo bombers) and 879 (Seafires) squadrons on board.

=== Mediterranean ===
==== Operation Avalanche ====
Attacker transferred to the Mediterranean theatre reaching Malta, 7 September 1943 as part of "Task Force 88", consisting of the escort carriers Battler, Hunter, Stalker, the aircraft repair ship Unicorn, the cruisers Euryalus, Scylla, Charybdis, the destroyers Cleveland Holcombe, Atherstone, Liddesdale, Farndale, Calpe, and the Polish destroyers Ślązak and Krakowiak to providing cover for the Allied amphibious landings on mainland Italy, near Salerno, in Operation Avalanche. From 9 to 12 September, the five carriers launched a total of 713 sorties, with Attacker sending out 132. Seventy-five patrol sorties were carried out by 879 Naval Air Squadron (NAS) while 57 were flown by 886 NAS, with no aircraft lost to enemy action. Attacker joined Convoy MK 24, along with Hunter and Stalker, to escort it from Gibraltar to the Clyde, from 17 September to 6 October 1943. She then sailed for Rosyth Naval Dockyard, on 7 October, for conversion to an assault carrier, arriving 10 October.

==== Conversion ====
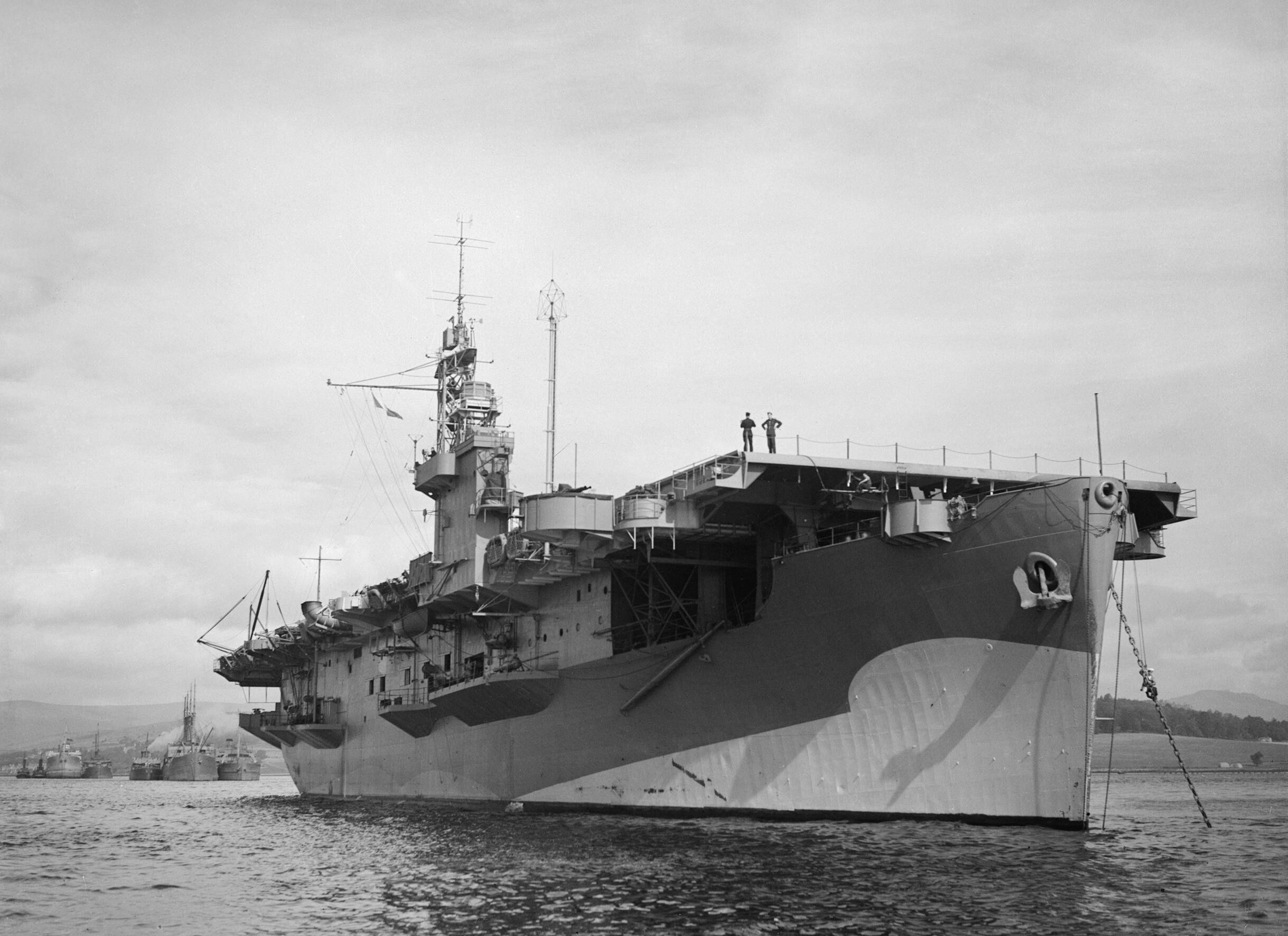
Attacker at anchor in Greenock, Scotland

With her upgrades finished in December 1943, Attacker again embarked Seafires of 879 and 886 squadrons on 29 December, for training from January to February 1944, in her new role of providing air support for major military landings until shore based air strips became operational. Operation Avalanche had proven a need for this strategy. She returned to Liverpool, on 9 February, for further repairs.

Attacker, along with Hunter and Stalker, were ordered to Scapa Flow, arriving on 5 May 1944, for participation in Operation Hoops scheduled for 8 May. However, before the operation was launched changes were made and the escort carriers Emperor, Searcher, and Striker were instead allocated and the three carriers set sail for Belfast, on 7 May, and arrived the next day.

On 14 May, the three ships set out for the Mediterranean as additional escorts for the Convoy KMS 51, which had departed Liverpool, the previous day. Attacker detached from the convoy on 19 May, and put into Gibraltar, 24 May. On 2 June, she moved from her berth on the North Mole to the inside of the Detached Mole, where on the night of 4 June, while silhouetted behind the mole, an enemy submarine launched a torpedo at her. The torpedo detonated on the outside of the mole which caused to serious damage to Attacker. On June 6, she and Hunter sailed for Mers El Kébir, providing air cover for Convoy KMS 52.

==== Operation Dragoon ====
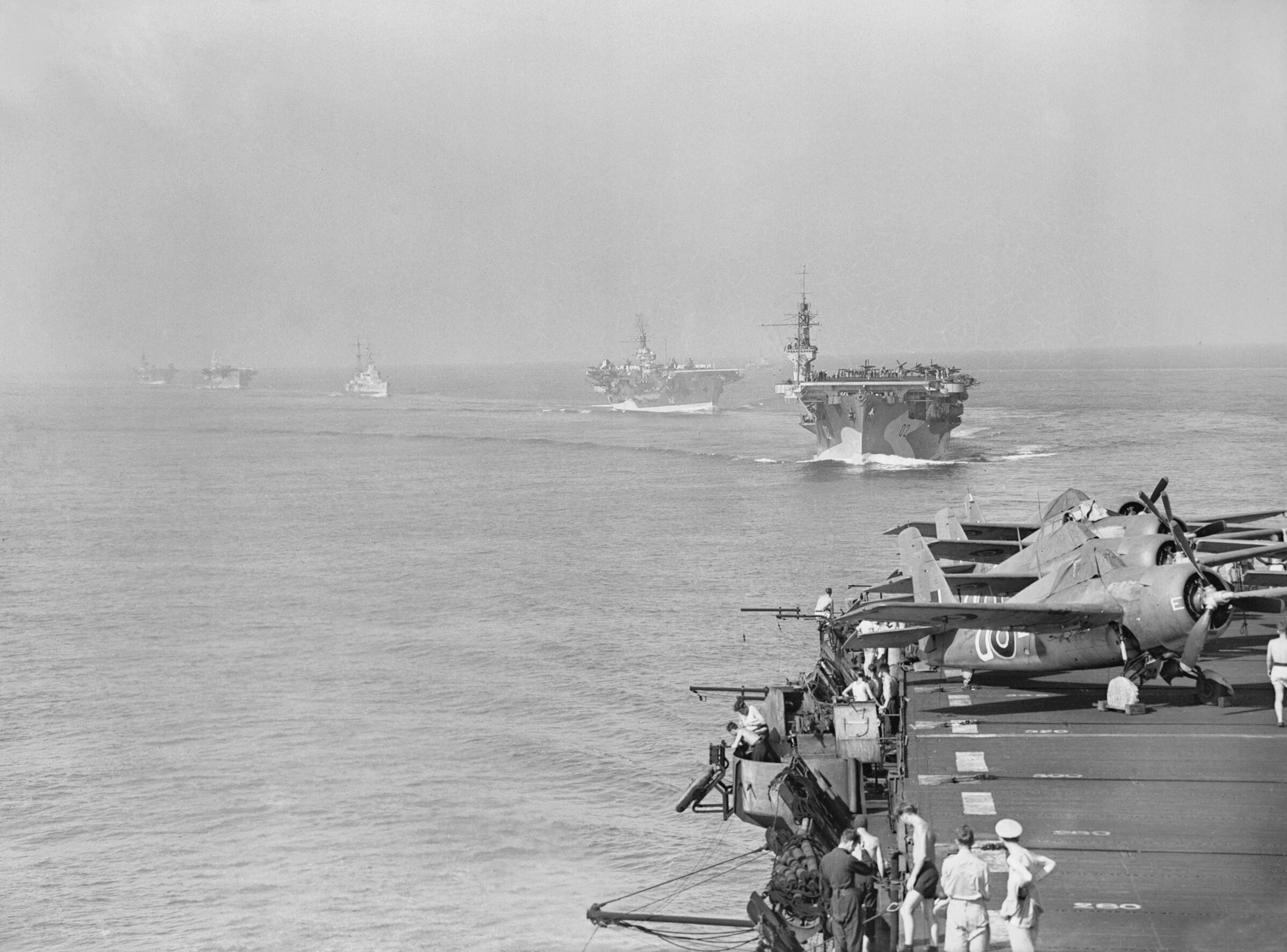
View of Attacker, and other assault carriers, from Pursuer 7 August 1944, before Operation Dragoon

During June 1944, Attacker provided air cover for several convoys travelling in the Western Mediterranean. On 23 July, she sailed for Malta, in company with Khedive, Pursuer, Searcher and Emperor, anchoring in Dockyard Creek on 25 July, to prepare for Operation Dragoon.

Attacker joined Carrier Force TF88.1 for Operation Dragoon. The force exercised off Malta, between 2 and 12 August, with the invasion starting in the early hours of 15 August. On 19 August, TF88.1 withdrew to Maddalena, Sardinia, for refueling and rearming. They took up position south of Marseille, on 21 August, until 23 August, when they returned to Maddalena, again to refuel and rearm. TF88.1 was released on 28 August. Attacker had completed 106 ground strike, bombardment spotting for Aurora, tactical reconnaissance missions and 120 bombing sorties. She left Maddalena, for Alexandria, on 29 August.

==== Operations Outing I, Outing II, Manna ====
Attacker set sail on 14 September 1944, to participate in Operation Outing I, an operation designed to delay German troop movements in the Dodecanese Islands. She arrived 15 September, and relieved Hunter. She returned to Alexandria, on 20 September, to resupply, and returned to the Dodecanese Islands, on 27 September, for Operation Outing II. She again returned to Alexandria, 5 October, for further refuel and rearm. Hunter was again relieved by Attacker in the eastern Aegean Sea, on 11 October, for Operation Manna. Returning 30 October, to Alexandria.

Attacker, along with Hunter and Stalker, set sail for the United Kingdom, on 31 October 1944, having been picked for service with the East Indies Fleet. After a brief stopover at Malta, on 3 November, the three carriers reached Plymouth, 10 November, for a short period of defect rectifications at the Devonport Naval Dockyard and the opportunity for their crews to go on home leave. On 29 November, the three set out for the Mediterranean, to undergo refits in transit to the Pacific. They arrived in Gibraltar, on 3 December, where Stalker was refit with Hunter proceeding to Malta, and Attacker proceeding to Taranto, Italy, their refits.

After completing refit trials Attacker set sail on 1 April 1945, for Alexandria. She embarked 879 squadron on 14 April, then proceeded through the Suez Canal, to Aden, and then Ceylon, arriving 29 April.

=== Pacific War ===
Attacker was assigned to 21 ACS, but due to defects discovered during her transit to the Pacific Theater, she was deemed unfit for operation. During May, and part of June, Attacker and Hunter were assigned to aircraft transport duties between India and South Africa to Ceylon.

==== Operation Carson ====
After a couple of training periods during June and July with 879 NAS she was allocated to Task Force 61 to participate in Operation Carson, attacks on Japanese shipping and airfields in the Penang and Medan areas of Sumatra. She again embarked 879 NAS on 9 August, and sailed from Trincomalee, on 10 August 1945, along with the escort carriers Ameer, Emperor, Empress, Khedive, and Shah with strikes planned to be carried out on 14 and 15 August. Task Force 61 was order to hold west of 90 degrees east latitude on 11 August, to wait for further orders. They were ordered to return to Trincomalee, arriving 15 August, where they received the Station General Message, "SUSPEND OFFENSIVE OPERATIONS AGAINST JAPANESE FORCES." Attacker was in harbour at Trincomalee, to celebrate V-J Day while waiting on new orders. She had already been allocated to Operation Zipper, the planned invasion of Singapore, which was scheduled for September 1945. With the end of hostilities, they were a reoccupying force instead of an invading force.

==== Operations Jurist and Tiderace ====
In late August 1945, Attacker witnessed the Japanese surrender of Penang, in Malaya, as part of Operation Jurist.

In September 1945, Attacker was present at Singapore, as part of Operation Tiderace, sailing immediately afterwards for Clyde, to de-store and enter reserve.

== Naval Air Squadrons ==
Fleet Air Arm Squadrons stationed on Attacker
NAS	Dates	Aircraft type
838	December 1942 – April 1943	Fairey Swordfish Mks.I
840	March–April 1943	Fairey Swordfish Mk.II
886	June–October 1943	Supermarine Seafire LF.IIc/Fairey Swordfish Mks.I
879	July 1943 – November 1945	Supermarine Seafire LF.IIc
886	December 1943 – February 1944	Supermarine Seafire LF.IIc
809	November–December 1944	Supermarine Seafire LF.IIc

== Honours ==
Attacker was awarded Royal Navy honours for her contribution to the Battle of the Atlantic (1943–44), for support to the Salerno landings (1943), and to the South France and Aegean campaigns in 1944. The vessel left British waters in December 1945, being formally received back into United States' custody at the Norfolk Navy Yard, Norfolk, Virginia, on 5 January 1946, and struck from naval service on 26 February 1946.

== Merchant service ==
In February 1947, the ship was sold into merchant service to National Bulk Carriers of New York, who in preparation for conversion to a cargo ship, arranged for the removal of the vessel's flight deck and other wartime fittings. The work eventually stopped and the vessel was offered for re-sale. In 1950, it was bought by the Vlasov Group and placed under the nominal ownership of Vlasov's American subsidiary, Navcot Corporation. Renamed Castel Forte, the ship remained idle whilst suitable employment could be found.

In 1957, Vlasov secured a charter from the Australian government for Castel Forte to carry British migrants to Australia. During the conversion to a passenger liner the ship was renamed Fairsky and was operated by Vlasov's Italian managed company, Sitmar Line. On completion of the refurbishment in June 1958, the "new-look" vessel began a long career as a migrant-carrying ship, which was to last until 1974, with the final migrant voyage from Southampton to Auckland. On 23 June 1977, while operating as a cruise ship, Fairsky hit a submerged wreck and was beached to prevent sinking. The damage was temporarily patched and the ship refloated six days later. When the full extent of the damage became known, Sitmar decided against permanent repairs and they offered the vessel for sale.

Having been reprieved from going straight to the breakers, in 1978, work began to convert the vessel to a static floating hotel and casino named Philippine Tourist. However, the ship was badly damaged by fire on 3 November 1979, and subsequently scrapped in Hong Kong, the hulk having arrived there under tow on 24 May 1980.

== Bibliography ==
- Gerhardt, Frank A. "SS Steel Artisan". United States Maritime Commission 1936 thru 1950.
- "Seaplane and Aircraft Carriers". Fleet Air Arm Officers Association.
- "A History of HMS Attacker". Royal Navy Research Archive. 11 June 2020.
- "Attacker". DANFS. Navy Department, Naval History and Heritage Command. This article incorporates text from this source, which is in the public domain.
- Cocker, Maurice (2008). Aircraft-Carrying Ships of the Royal Navy. Stroud, Gloucestershire: The History Press. ISBN 978-0-7524-4633-2.
- Morison, Samuel (2002). History of United States Naval Operations in World War II. Urbana, Illinois: University of Illinois Press. ISBN 978-0-252-07062-4.
- Plowman, Peter (2006). Australian Migrant Ships 1946-1977. Kenthurst New South Wales: Rosenberg Publishing. ISBN 978-1-877058-40-0.
- Poolman, Kenneth (1972). Escort Carrier 1941–1945. London: Ian Allan. ISBN 0-7110-0273-8.
- Hague, Arnold. "Convoy CU 1".
