= HMS Hunter (D80) =

1943 Attacker-class escort carrier later converted to a merchant ship

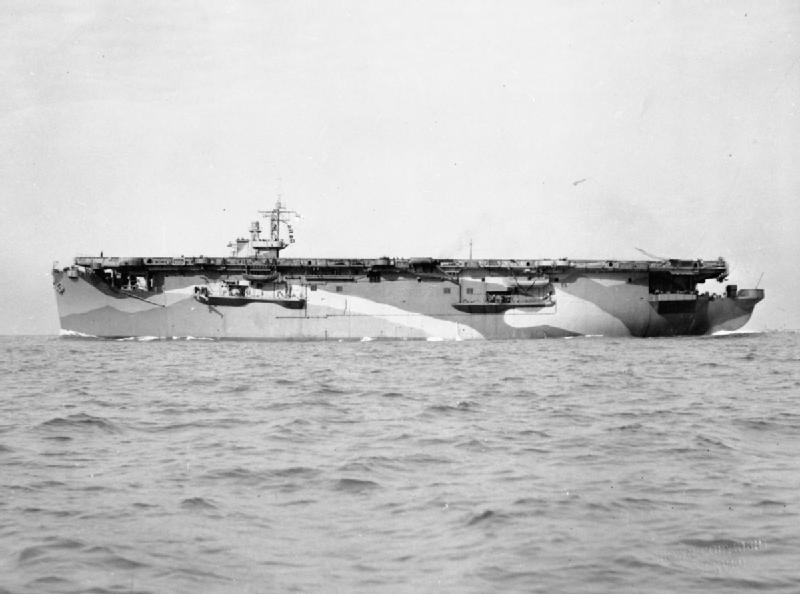
- HMS Hunter

History

United States
- Name: USS Block Island
- Namesake: Block Island Sound
- Builder: Ingalls Shipbuilding
- Laid down: 15 May 1941, as Mormacpenn
- Launched: 22 May 1942
- Commissioned: 9 January 1943
- Out of service: Loaned to Royal Navy 1943-1945
- Stricken: 17 January 1947
- Fate: Sold into merchant service 1947, scrapped in Spain in 1965

United Kingdom
- Name: HMS Hunter
- Commissioned: 11 January 1943
- Decommissioned: 29 December 1945
- Renamed: Initially HMS Trailer, before being named HMS Hunter, As merchant ship:Almdijk
- Fate: Returned to United States 29 December 1945

Netherlands
- Name: Almdijk (1947–1953); Alblasserdyk (1953–1965)
- Owner: Holland America Line
- Operator: Holland America Line
- Acquired: 17 January 1947
- Out of service: 1965
- Fate: Scrapped in 1965

General characteristics
- Class & type: Attacker-class escort carrier
- Displacement: 14,400 tons
- Length: 491 ft 6 in (149.81 m)
- Beam: 105 ft (32 m)
- Draught: 26 ft (7.9 m)
- Propulsion: Steam turbines; 1 shaft; 8,500 shp (6,300 kW)
- Speed: 18 knots (33 km/h; 21 mph)
- Complement: 646
- Armament: 2 × 4"/50, 5"/38 or 5"/51; 8 × 40 mm; 20 × 20 mm guns

USS Block Island (CVE-8) (originally AVG and then ACV) was an Attacker-class escort aircraft carrier that served during World War II.

The ship was laid down on 15 May 1941 as Mormacpenn under Maritime Commission contract at Pascagoula, Mississippi, by Ingalls Shipbuilding, acquired by the United States Navy on 9 January 1943 and simultaneously transferred via the Lend-Lease program to the United Kingdom as Trailer. On 11 January 1943, the ship was renamed HMS Hunter (D80) and commissioned by the Royal Navy. In March 1945 was attached to the 21st Aircraft Carrier Squadron. She participated in Operation Jurist and Operation Tiderace in August 1945, the reoccupation of Malaya and Singapore from the Japanese.

The vessel was returned to United States' custody 29 December 1945 and sold into merchant service on 17 January 1947 as Almdijk. In October 1965 the ship was sold for scrapping in Spain.

== Design and description ==
There were eight Attacker-class escort carriers in service with the Royal Navy during the Second World War. They were built between 1941 and 1942 by Ingalls Shipbuilding and Western Pipe & Steel shipyards in the United States, both building four ships each.

The ships had a complement of 646 men and crew accommodation was different from the normal Royal Navy's arrangements. The separate messes no longer had to prepare their own food, as everything was cooked in the galley and served cafeteria style in a central dining area. They were also equipped with a modern laundry and a barber shop. The traditional hammocks were replaced by three tier bunk beds, eighteen to a cabin which were hinged and could be tied up to provide extra space when not in use.

The ships dimensions were; an overall length of 492.25 feet (150.04 m), a beam of 69.5 feet (21.2 m) and a height of 23.25 ft (7.09 m). They had a displacement of 11,420 long tons (11,600 t) at deep load. Propulsion was provided by four diesel engines connected to one shaft giving 8,500 brake horsepower (6,300 kW), which could propel the ship at 17 knots (31 km/h; 20 mph).

Aircraft facilities were a small combined bridge–flight control on the starboard side and above the 450-by-120-foot (137 by 37 m) flight deck, two aircraft lifts 42 by 34 feet (13 by 10 m), and nine arrestor wires. Aircraft could be housed in the 260-by-62-foot (79 by 19 m) hangar below the flight deck. Armament comprised two 4"/50, 5"/38 or 5"/51 in single mounts, eight 40 mm anti-aircraft guns in twin mounts and twenty-one 20 mm anti-aircraft cannon in single or twin mounts. They had the capacity for up to eighteen aircraft which could be a mixture of Grumman Martlet, Hawker Sea Hurricane, Vought F4U Corsair fighter aircraft and Fairey Swordfish or Grumman Avenger anti-submarine aircraft.

== Bibliography ==
- Cocker, Maurice (2008). Aircraft-Carrying Ships of the Royal Navy. Stroud, Gloucestershire: The History Press. ISBN 978-0-7524-4633-2.
- Poolman, Kenneth (1972). Escort Carrier 1941–1945. London: Ian Allan. ISBN 0-7110-0273-8.
