= Operation Jurist =

British recapture of Penang following Japan's surrender in 1945

- Part of the Second World War
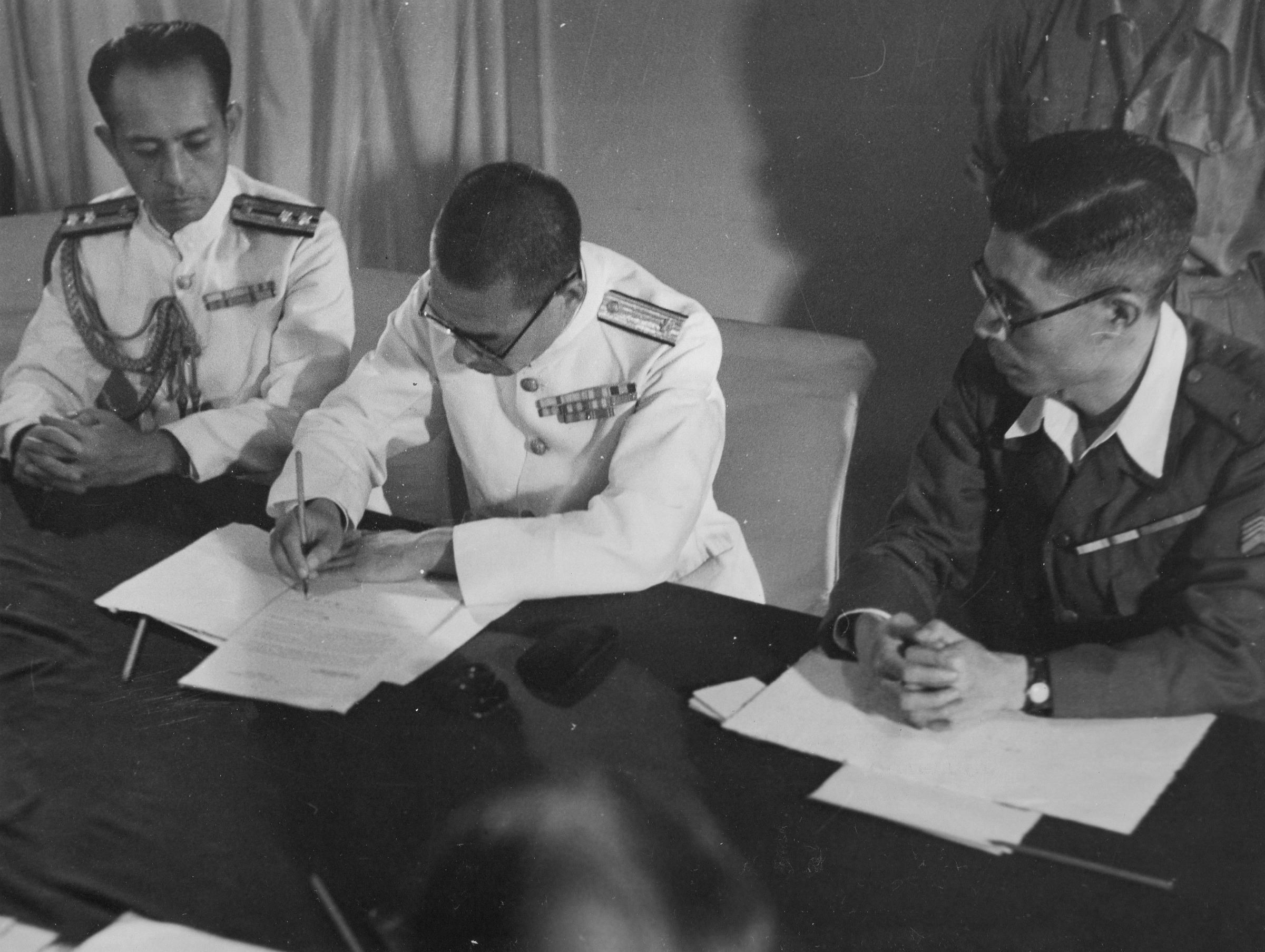
- Imperial Japanese Navy Rear Admiral Jisaku Uozumi signs the surrender of Penang aboard HMS Nelson on 2 September 1945. He fainted shortly afterwards and was rushed to hospital.
Date	28 August – 3 September 1945
Location	Penang, Straits Settlements
Result	British victory: Penang passed from Japanese occupation to British control
Territorial changes	Penang was the first state in Malaya to return to British rule.

Belligerents
British Empire	Empire of Japan

Commanders and leaders
(United Kingdom) Harold Walker	(Empire of Japan) Jisaku Uozumi (POW)

Units involved
(United Kingdom) 3 Commando Brigade (United Kingdom) Task Force 11	(Empire of Japan) 7th Area Army

Strength
42,651 infantry 2 escort carriers 1 battleship 1 light cruiser 3 destroyers 3 landing craft	26,000 infantry

Casualties and losses
None	26,000 captured

Operation Jurist referred to the British recapture of Penang following Japan's surrender in 1945. Jurist was launched as part of Operation Zipper, the overall British plan to reconquer Malaya, including Singapore.

While a larger Allied fleet sailed on to Singapore through the Malacca Strait under Operation Tiderace, a detachment of Royal Navy warships, led by Vice Admiral Harold Walker, moved towards Penang Island, arriving off the island on 28 August 1945. The Japanese garrison in Penang surrendered on 2 September and a party of Royal Marine commandos landed on Penang Island the following day, thus returning Penang to British rule.

Consequently, Penang became the first state in Malaya to be re-occupied by the British; Singapore would only be formally surrendered to the British on 12 September, while the rest of Malaya was subsequently conquered in the following weeks.

== Background ==
During the final phases of World War II, the Soviet Union launched an invasion of Manchuria, while the Americans were also planning a massive invasion of Japan itself. Concurrently, the British-led Southeast Asia Command, fresh from their success in reconquering Burma from Japanese hands, drew up plans to recapture Japanese-held Malaya, codenamed Operation Zipper.

The original plans had called for an amphibious assault on the western coast of Malaya by over 100,000 Allied infantry, equivalent to two divisions and a brigade, to capture Port Swettenham in Selangor and Port Dickson in Negeri Sembilan. Once the beachhead was secured and reinforced, two separate thrusts were to be accomplished—Operation Mailfist southwards to Singapore and Operation Broadsword north towards Penang. The British had expected to commence Operation Zipper on 9 September 1945 and Operation Mailfist in December 1945, concluding in the re-conquest of Singapore by March 1946.

The Americans opposed the British plans of reconquering Malaya on the grounds that such a campaign would divert a considerable amount of shipping and other resources from their planned invasion of Japan, Operation Downfall. However, the British government believed that it was necessary to capture Singapore as soon as possible on both military and political grounds.

However, the sudden surrender of Japan in the face of Soviet conquests in Manchuria and Sakhalin Islands, and the American atomic bombings of Hiroshima and Nagasaki, forestalled all the plans.

Operation Zipper, therefore, had to be reduced in scale; while the bulk of the Allied forces would be allocated for the conquest of Singapore under Operation Tiderace, a detachment of the Royal Navy fleet and the accompanying Royal Marine commandos were tasked with the conquest of Penang instead, codenamed Operation Jurist. The conquest of Penang, which was to be carried out prior to Operation Tiderace, was intended to test Japanese intentions; up to that point, it was still unclear whether the Japanese forces in Malaya would surrender or continue resisting the Allies.

== Order of battle ==
=== British ===
The Royal Navy's Task Force 11 allocated to Operation Jurist consisted of the following ships.

Battleship	HMS Nelson
Escort carriers	HMS Attacker; HMS Hunter
Light cruiser	HMS Ceylon
Destroyers	HMS Paladin; HMS Petard; HMS Volage
Other vessels:	3 infantry landing ships

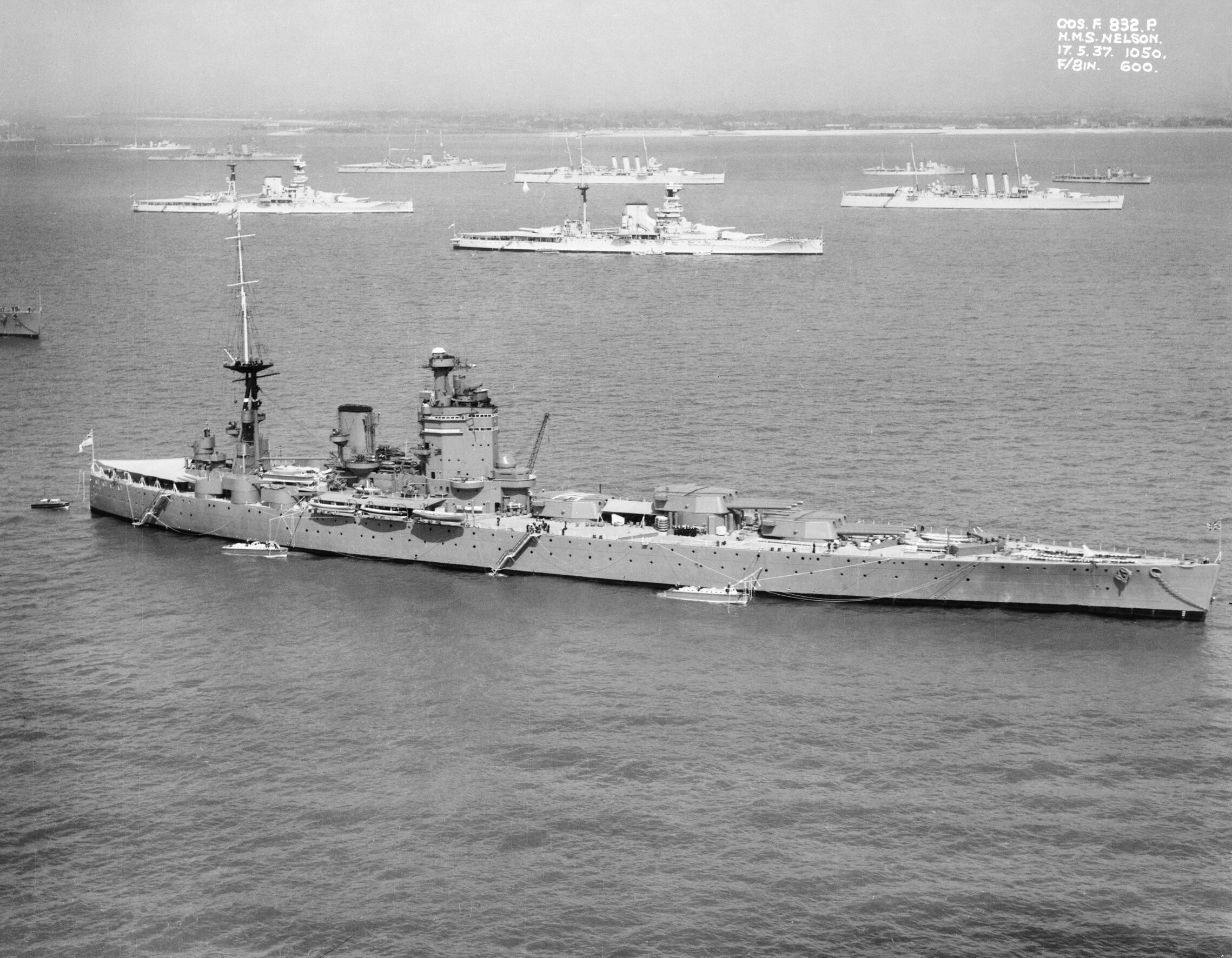
HMS Nelson served as the flagship of the Royal Navy's Task Force 11

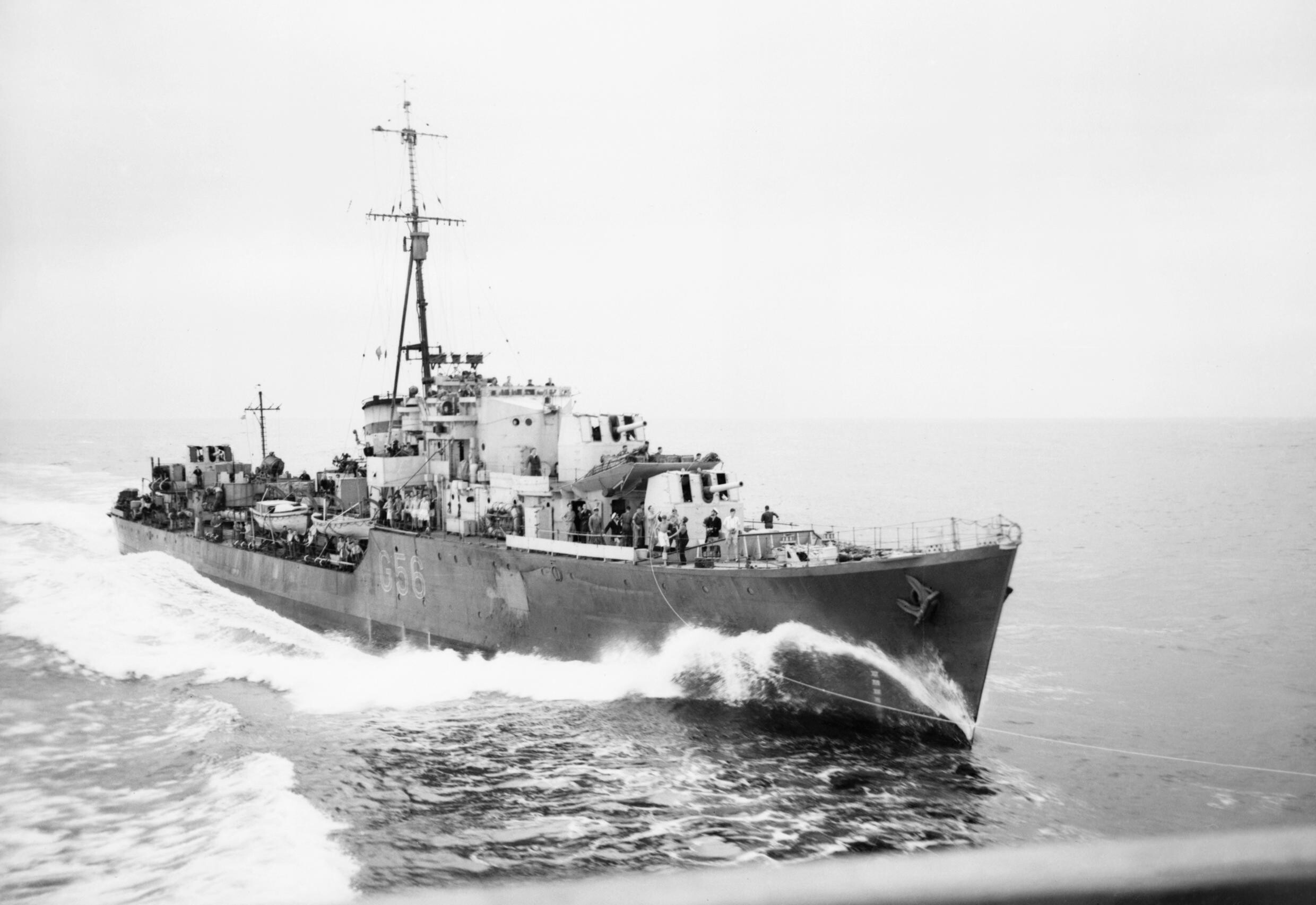
Royal Navy destroyer HMS Petard

Vice Admiral Harold Walker, with his flagship HMS Nelson, was appointed the commander of the detachment.

In addition, Royal Marine commandos of the 3rd Brigade formed the ground forces for Operation Jurist.

=== Japanese ===
Air strength in both Malaya and Sumatra was estimated to be a little more than 170 aircraft.

The Japanese Seventh Area Army, which was responsible for the defence of Malaya (including Singapore) and Borneo, included about 26,000 soldiers stationed in Malaya. Meanwhile, the port facilities in George Town, which had been used by the submarine fleets of the Axis navies, were by then heavily damaged by the repeated Allied aerial bombardment of the city. The Penang Strait was also mined to impede Japanese merchant shipping passing through Penang.

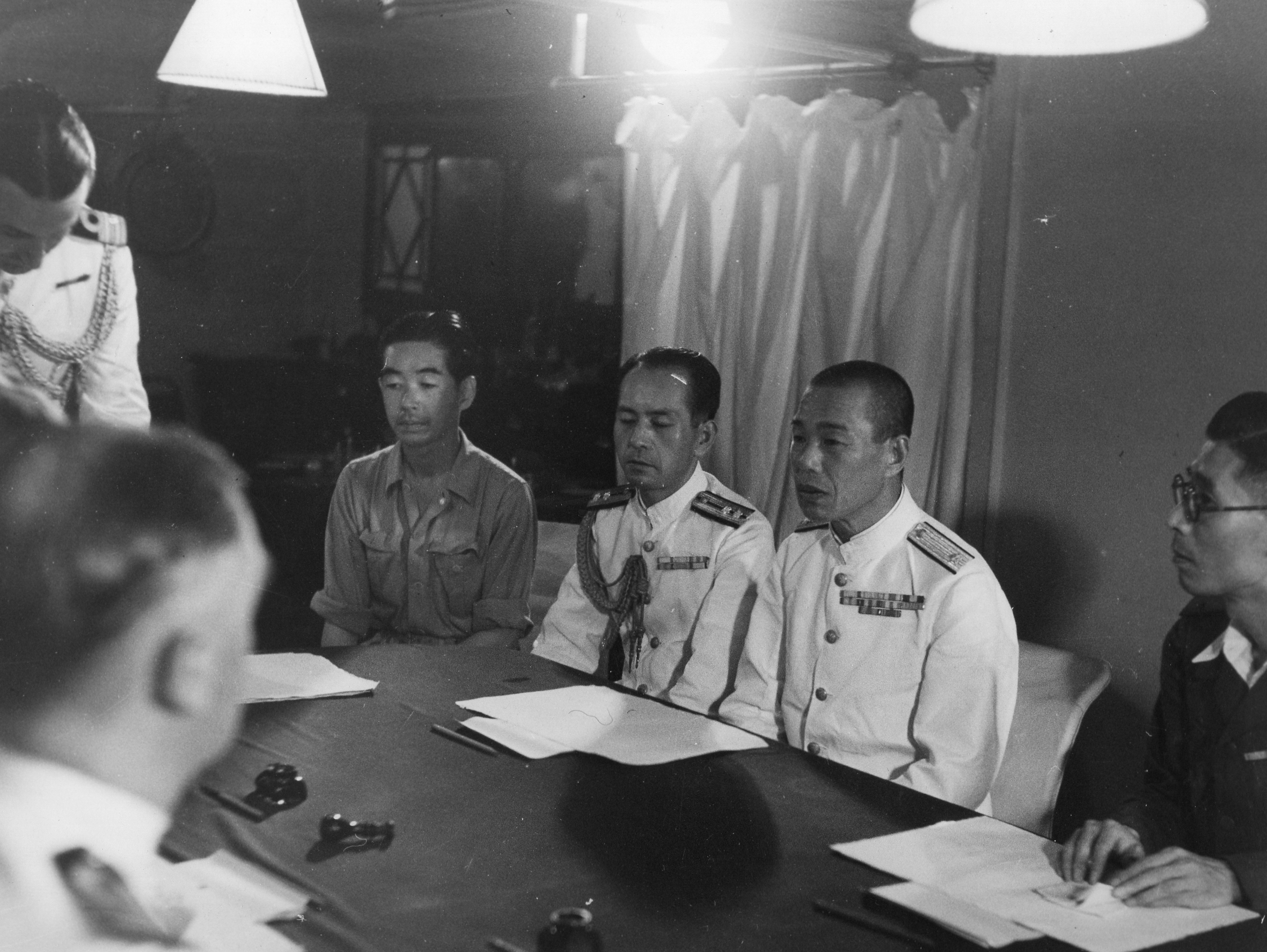
Rear Admiral Jisaku Uozomi (second from right) discussing the surrender of Penang with Vice Admiral Harold Walker aboard HMS Nelson

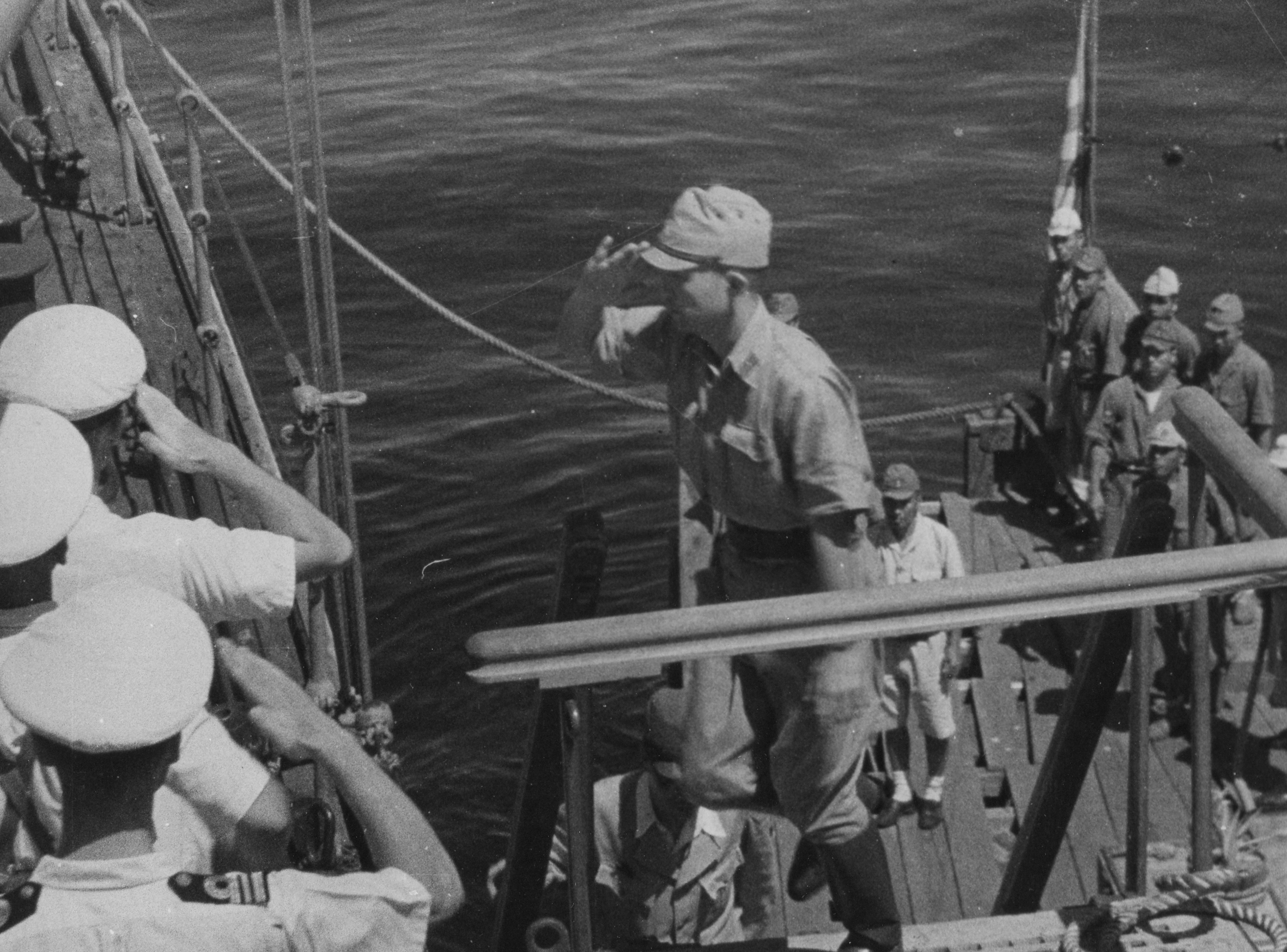
The Japanese surrender delegation boarding HMS Nelson on 2 September 1945.

== Capture of Penang ==
The Royal Navy's Task Force 11, carrying the Royal Marine commandos, departed Rangoon, Burma on 27 August 1945. The task force arrived off Penang Island on 28 August, met by a small fishing boat with Japanese officers on board.

Initially, the Japanese officers in Penang prevaricated. Japan's surrender had taken the Japanese high command in Singapore by surprise, with many among them unwilling to surrender and vowing to fight to the death. However, Field Marshal Count Terauchi, the commander of all Japanese forces in Southeast Asia, then ordered Japanese soldiers and servicemen in the region to lay down their arms. Things came to a head when an impatient Vice Admiral Walker issued an ultimatum for the Japanese officers stationed in Penang to sign the surrender documents on his flagship by the morning of 3 September.

Eventually, the Imperial Japanese Navy Rear Admiral Jisaku Uozomi, accompanied by his officers and the Japanese Governor of Penang at the time, Lieutenant General Shinohara Seiichiro, boarded HMS Nelson on the evening on 2 September. Inside the battleship, Vice Admiral Harold Walker, Rear Admiral Uozomi and Lieutenant General Seiichiro signed the surrender of the Japanese garrison stationed in Penang. Soon afterwards, Rear Admiral Uozomi reportedly fainted and was rushed to hospital.

In the morning of 3 September, a party of Royal Marine commandos landed at Weld Quay in George Town. After raising the Union Jack, the Royal Marines, led by a local band, marched to the Eastern & Oriental Hotel, where representatives of the Asian communities in Penang were waiting to formally hand back the city's administration to the British.

The Royal Marine detachment then spread out across George Town, encountering no resistance. Subsequent Royal Marine landing parties then took over the important military facilities on Penang Island, including the Bayan Lepas Airport and a seaplane base at Gelugor. The British commandos also confiscated Japanese military vehicles and marched the Japanese prisoners of war through the streets of George Town; the captured Japanese soldiers then surrendered their firearms before boarding the ferries to mainland Malay Peninsula, which at that point was still under Japanese jurisdiction.

By the end of the day, with the island's police force under British control, George Town became the first city in Malaya to be recaptured by the British. However, hunger riots broke out across Penang Island, as years of brutal Japanese occupation took their toll on the depleted food supplies.

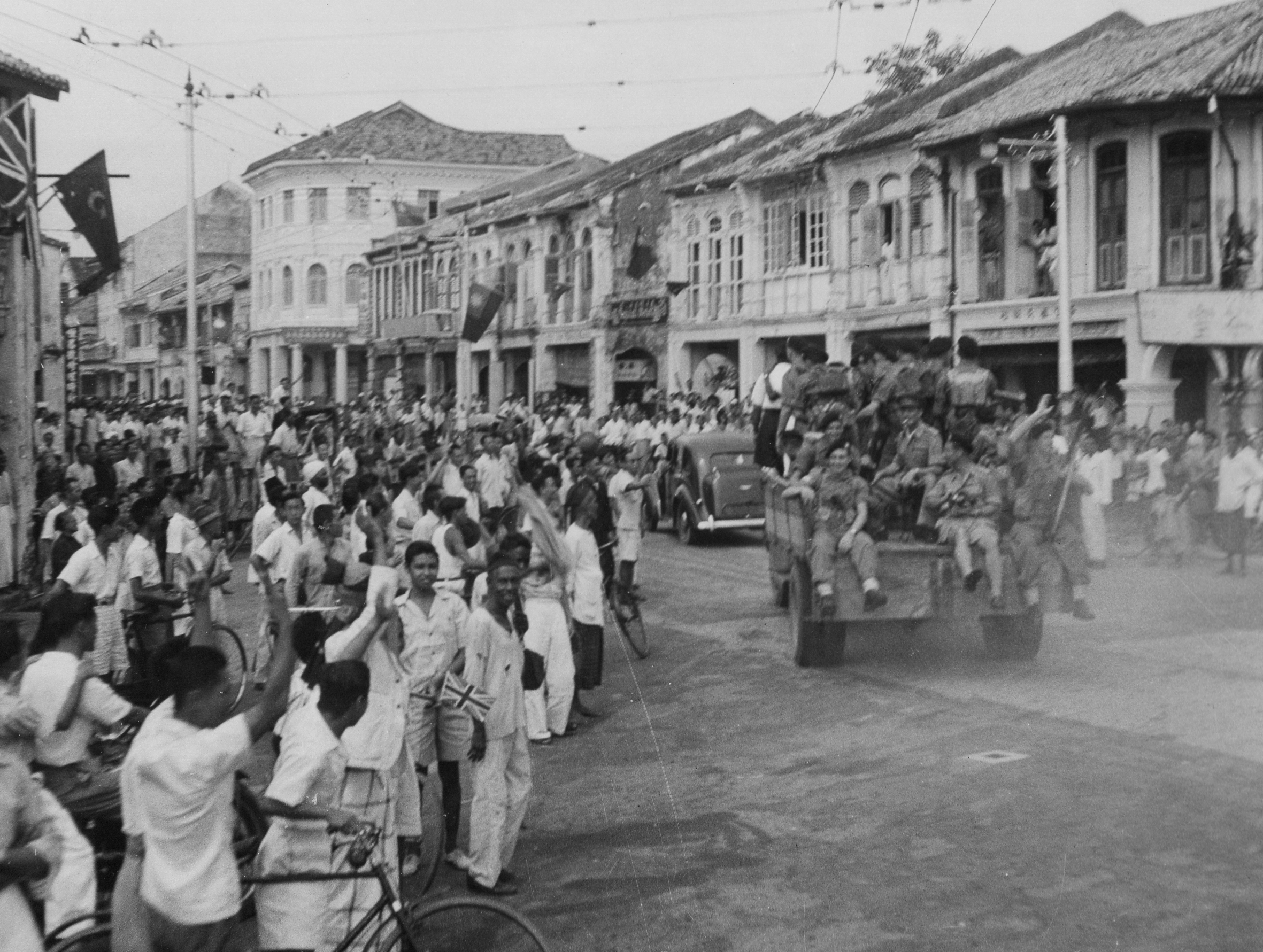
Royal Marine commandos parading on confiscated Japanese vehicles in George Town on 3 September 1945

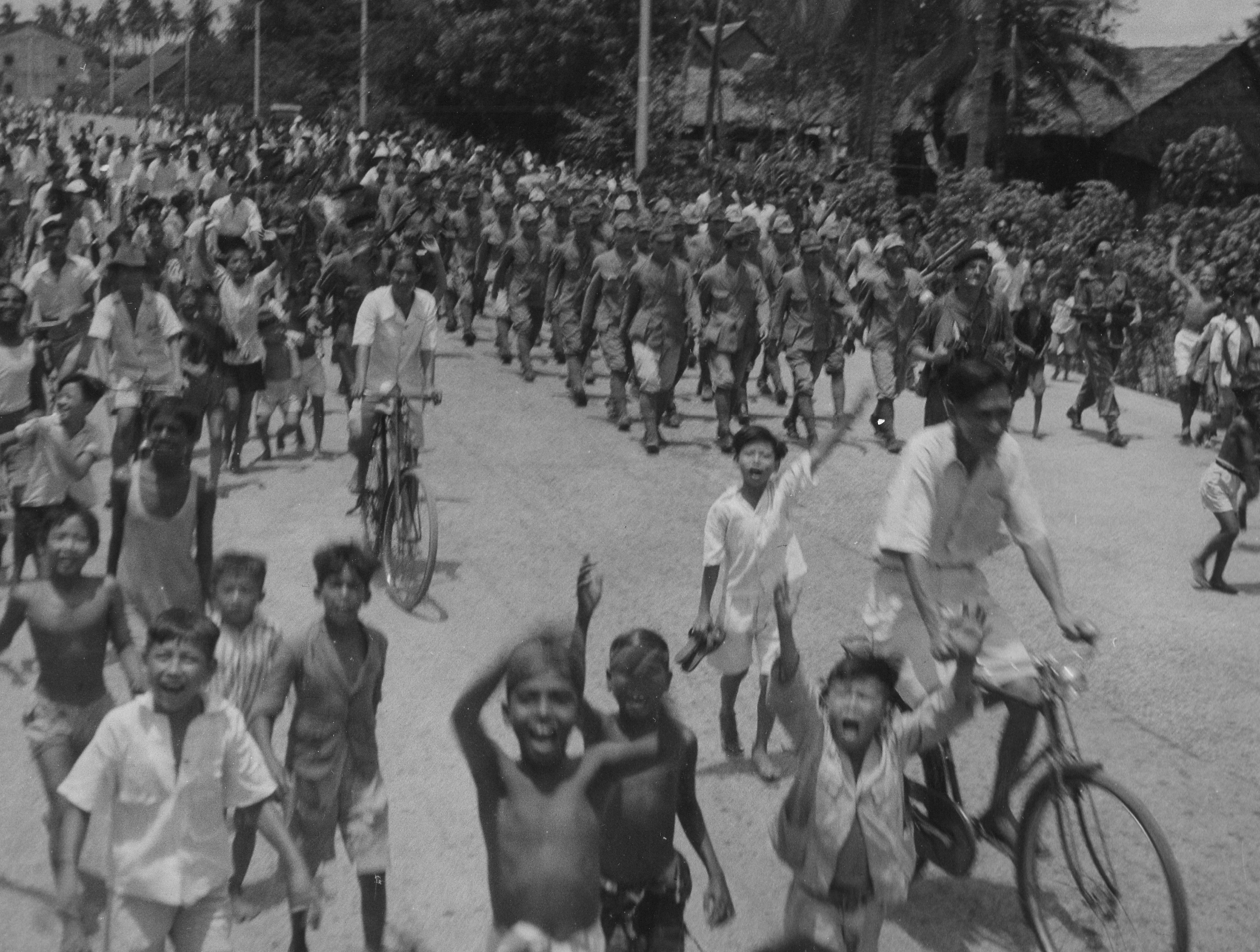
Japanese prisoners of war being marched through the streets of George Town on 3 September 1945

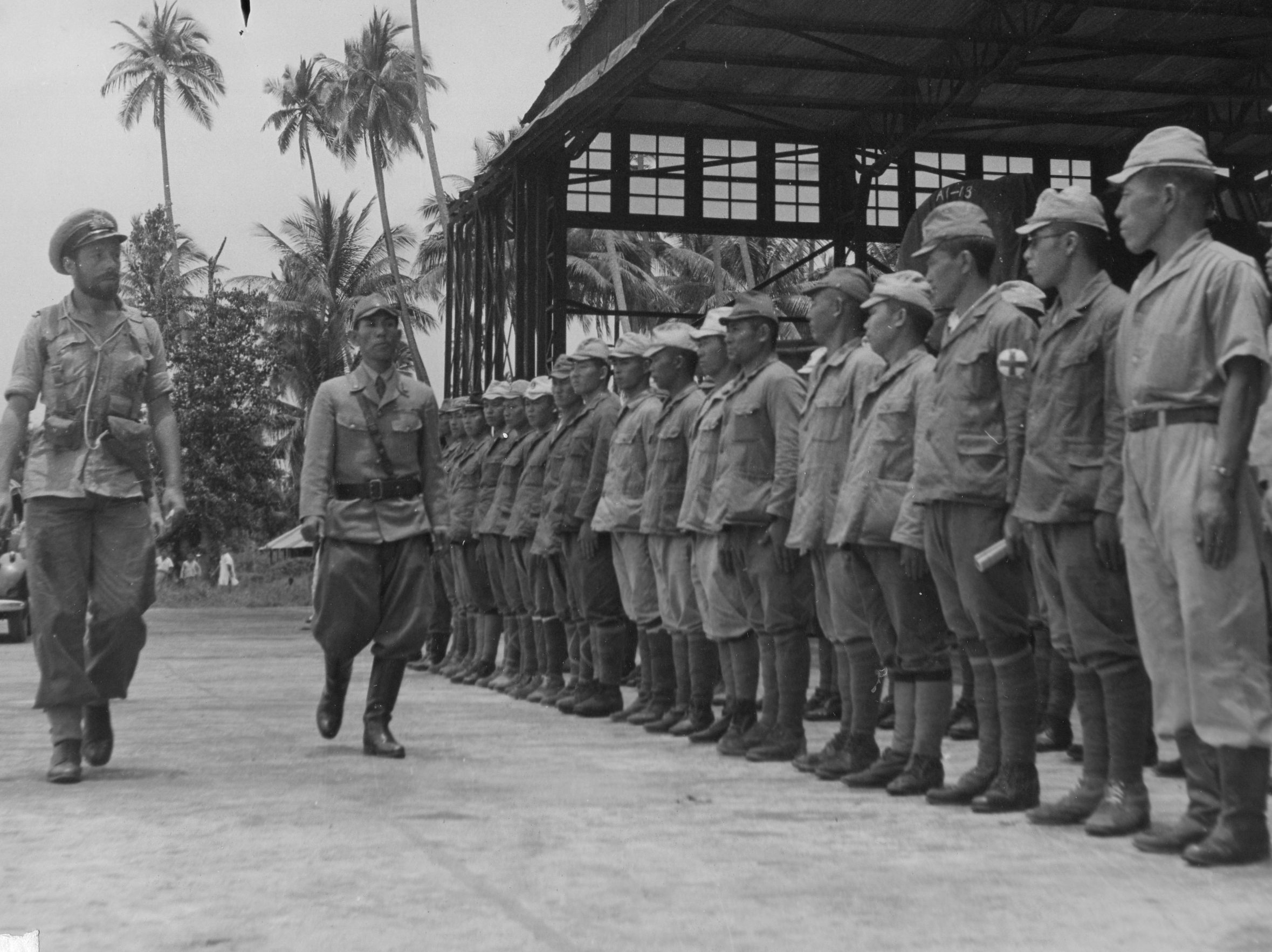
A Royal Navy officer inspecting the Japanese soldiers at the seaplane base at Gelugor

== Aftermath ==
Penang became the first state in Malaya to be re-captured by the British from Japanese rule. Over the following weeks, the rest of Malaya was gradually conquered as well. Under Operation Tiderace, the larger British and French naval force arrived off Singapore on 4 September, formally accepting the official Japanese surrender of the island on 12 September. On 9 September, another component of Operation Zipper commenced when an amphibious assault was launched at Morib, Selangor. British troops also reached Kuala Lumpur on 12 September, where the 6,000 strong Japanese garrison surrendered on the next day.

On the other hand, the British were slow at reestablishing control over all of Malaya; for instance, British forces would not reach the eastern state of Pahang for another three weeks. This allowed a growing communist insurgency to take over a number of smaller towns throughout Malaya. It was only much later in 1945 when the Malayan Communist Party's armed wing, the Malayan Peoples' Anti Japanese Army (MPAJA), agreed to surrender their weapons.

To restore order and curb the communists, all of Malaya was placed under British Military Administration beginning 12 September. British military rule would only end on 1 April 1946, whereupon it was replaced by the Malayan Union. Concurrently on 1 April 1946, the Straits Settlements was dissolved, and the now separate British crown colonies of Penang and Malacca became part of the Malayan Union.
