= HM LST-410 =

1942 LST-1-class tank landing ship

History

United Kingdom
- Name: LST-410
- Ordered: as a Type S3-M-K2 hull, MCE hull 930
- Builder: Bethlehem-Fairfield Shipyard, Baltimore, Maryland
- Yard number: 2182
- Laid down: 13 September 1942
- Launched: 15 November 1942
- Commissioned: 14 January 1943
- Decommissioned: 16 March 1946
- Identification: Hull symbol: LST-410
- Fate: Returned to USN custody, 16 March 1946

United States
- Name: LST-410
- Acquired: 16 March 1946
- Stricken: 26 February 1946
- Fate: Sold for scrapping, 13 February 1948

General characteristics
- Class & type: LST-1-class tank landing ship
- Displacement: 4,080 long tons (4,145 t) full load; 2,160 long tons (2,190 t) landing
- Length: 328 ft (100 m) oa
- Beam: 50 ft (15 m)
- Draft: Full load: 8 ft 2 in (2.49 m) forward; 14 ft 1 in (4.29 m) aft; Landing at 2,160 t: 3 ft 11 in (1.19 m) forward; 9 ft 10 in (3.00 m) aft
- Installed power: 2 × 900 hp (670 kW) Electro-Motive Diesel 12-567A diesel engines; 1,700 shp (1,300 kW)
- Propulsion: 1 × Falk main reduction gears; 2 × Propellers
- Speed: 12 kn (22 km/h; 14 mph)
- Range: 24,000 nmi (44,000 km; 28,000 mi) at 9 kn (17 km/h; 10 mph) while displacing 3,960 long tons (4,024 t)
- Boats & landing craft carried: 2 or 6 x LCVPs
- Capacity: 2,100 tons oceangoing maximum; 350 tons main deckload
- Troops: 163
- Complement: 117
- Armament: Varied, ultimate armament; 1 × QF 12-pounder 12 cwt naval gun; 6 × 20 mm (0.79 in) Oerlikon cannon; 4 × Fast Aerial Mine (FAM) mounts

HMS LST-410 was a United States Navy LST-1-class tank landing ship that was transferred to the Royal Navy during World War II. As with many of her class, the ship was never named. Instead, she was referred to by her hull designation.

== Construction ==
LST-410 was laid down on 13 September 1942, under United States Maritime Commission (MARCOM) contract, MC hull 930, by the Bethlehem-Fairfield Shipyard, Baltimore, Maryland; launched 15 November 1942; then transferred to the United Kingdom and commissioned on 14 January 1943.

== Service history ==
LST-410 served the Royal Navy during the invasion of Normandy. She then served as part of "W" Task Force where she served off the coast of Arakan, while participating in the Burma Campaign. LST-410 took part in Operation Dracula, the retaking of Rangoon, Operation Zipper, the retaking of Malaya, and Operation Tiderace, the retaking of Singapore. She then provided relief work repatriating ex-POWs of the Japanese after the war.

LST-410 saw no active service in the United States Navy. The tank landing ship was struck from the Navy list on 26 February 1946. She was returned to United States Navy custody and decommissioned on 16 March 1946. On 13 February 1948, LST-410 was sold to Bosey, Philippines, and subsequently scrapped.

== See also ==
- List of United States Navy LSTs

== Notes ==
Citations

== Bibliography ==
Online resources

- "LST-410". Dictionary of American Naval Fighting Ships. Naval History and Heritage Command. 30 July 2015. This article incorporates text from this source, which is in the public domain.
- "Bethlehem-Fairfield, Baltimore MD". ShipbuildingHistory.com. 14 August 2008.
- "USS LST-410". NavSource. 21 February 2014.
