= Bruce Loxton =

Australian naval historian

- Born: 31 March 1924; Enmore, New South Wales
- Died: 7 September 2006 (aged 82); Sydney, New South Wales
- Military career
- Allegiance: Australia
- Branch: Royal Australian Navy
- Service years: 1938–1984
- Rank: Commodore
- Commands: HMAS Supply (1974); Director of Naval Intelligence (1966–68); HMAS Yarra (1964–65)
- Conflicts: Second World War; Battle of Savo Island; Indonesia–Malaysia confrontation; Korean War

Commodore Bruce Hamilton Loxton (31 March 1924 – 7 September 2006) was an Australian naval officer, naval historian, and Director-General of Naval Manpower in the Royal Australian Navy from 1975 until his retirement.

== Early life ==
Loxton was born in Sydney and educated at Newington College (1933–1935) and The Scots College (1936).

== Military education ==
At the age of 13, Loxton entered the Royal Australian Naval College (RANC) as one of only 16 candidates selected from 480 applicants. He graduated from RANC in 1941, and was made a Lieutenant in 1944. He later graduated from the Naval War College at Newport, Rhode Island (1960), and the Royal Naval Staff College, Greenwich, (1961).

== HMAS Canberra ==
Loxton was 18 and a midshipman on the ship's bridge of HMAS Canberra when it was sunk at the Battle of Savo Island. During the attack, a shell struck him and he was badly wounded. In all, 84 Australian personnel died on Canberra. On their return to Sydney, Rear Admiral Gerard Muirhead-Gould, the officer in charge of the Sydney naval area, told the crew of Canberra that they should feel ashamed that their ship had been sunk by gunfire without firing a shot in return. This annoyed Loxton for many years after the war, and he later set out to what had happened. In 1994, he co-authored the book, Shame of Savo, analysing the strategy, operations, communications, tactics, and command of the attack. He claimed that the American destroyer USS Bagley inadvertently torpedoed Canberra, crippling her through friendly fire before she could fire a shot.

== Military service ==
- Captain HMAS Yarra 1964–65
- Director of Naval Intelligence 1966–68
- Australian Naval Attaché, Washington 1968–71
- Director General Fighting Equipment, Navy office Canberra 1971–72
- Royal College of Defence Studies, London 1973
- Captain HMAS Supply 1974

== Books authored ==
- Loxton, Bruce; Coulthard-Clark, Chris (1997). The Shame of Savo: Anatomy of a Naval Disaster. St. Leonards, New South Wales, Australia: Allen & Unwin. ISBN 1-86448-286-9.
- Loxton, Bruce (1976). Soviet Maritime Expansion and its implications.

== Honours ==
- National Medal 1st Clasp – 1977 for diligent long service to the community in hazardous circumstances, including in times of emergency and national disaster, in direct protection of life and property.
- National Medal 2nd Clasp – 1978 for diligent long service to the community in hazardous circumstances, including in times of emergency and national disaster, in direct protection of life and property.
