= British Naval Forces Germany =

Flag Officer, British Naval Forces Germany
- Active: 1944–1961
- Country: United Kingdom
- Allegiance: British Empire
- Branch: Royal Navy
- Type: Command
- Part of: Admiralty (1944–1961)
- Garrison/HQ: HMS Royal Charlotte, Minden; North Rhine-Westphalia; West Germany

British Naval Forces Germany was a command (military formation) of the Royal Navy that was active from 1944 to 1961 under three titles.

It was administered originally by the British Naval Commander-in-Chief, Germany from 1944 to 1946. In 1946 the commander's title changed to Vice-Admiral Commanding, British Naval Forces, Germany from 1946 to 1947, before being renamed to Flag Officer, British Naval Forces Germany until 1961.

== History ==
In 1944, the Allied Naval Commander-in-Chief, Expeditionary Force, was also given the title of British Naval Commander-in-Chief, Germany. In addition, he became also Head of the Naval Division of the Control Commission for Germany, not always in attendance in Berlin, he was represented by a Deputy Head who attended the BERGOS (Chiefs of Staff) meetings.

His headquarters were initially at Hamburg and then transferred later at Minden. His title was altered in 1946 to Vice Admiral Commanding, British Naval Forces, Germany. In 1947 the post holders title was changed to Flag Officer Commanding, British Naval Forces, Germany. Apart from his additional role as Chief British Naval Representative in the Allied Control Commission (Germany), he was responsible for all naval matters in Western Germany, Denmark, Holland and Norway.

As British Naval Commander-in-Chief, Germany, he was supported by a number of flag officers some of whose titles changed, due to an expanding of their particular command areas and duties. Rear-Admiral Harold Tom Baillie-Grohman began his appointment in 1944 as Flag Officer-in-Charge, Kiel but then became Flag Officer, Schleswig-Holstein. Baillie-Grohman's main task was eliminating remnants of the Kriegsmarine. Flag Officer, Wilhelmshaven became Flag Officer, Western Germany.

In May 1951 the admiral's title was changed again to Flag Officer, Germany. In 1955 the Secretary of State for Defence described the admiral's duties as "The Flag Officer, Germany, in his North Atlantic Treaty Organisation capacity as the Commander, Allied Naval Forces, Northern Area, Central Europe, is responsible to the Supreme Allied Commander, Europe, for naval planning matters in the British Zone and for the operational control of the Royal Naval forces in Germany. He is the naval member of the Commanders-in-Chief Committee (Germany) which is responsible to the Chiefs of Staff Committee in this country. The entry into force of the Paris Treaties will not affect the foregoing duties of the post until at least the future German navy is capable of performing the tasks required of naval forces in Germany."

In 1961 the post was disestablished.

The command had its headquarters in four successive locations:

Unit	Location	Dates	Notes/Ref
HMS Royal Henry	Hamburg State, Germany	1944–1945	
HMS Royal Albert	Hamburg State, Germany/West Germany	1946–1950	
HMS Royal Prince	Minden, North Rhine-Westphalia, West Germany	1950–1956	
HMS Royal Charlotte	Minden, North Rhine-Westphalia, West Germany	1957–1961	

== Flag Officers ==
=== British Naval Commander-in-Chief, Germany ===
Post holders included:

	Rank	Flag	Name	Term	Notes/Ref
British Naval Commander-in-Chief, Germany
1	Admiral	Admiral - Royal Navy	Sir Bertram Ramsay	27 April 1944 – May 1945	
2	Admiral	Admiral - Royal Navy	Sir Harold M. Burrough	May 1945 – March 1946	

==== Flag Officer, Holland ====
	Rank	Flag	Name	Term	Notes/Ref
Flag Officer, Holland
1	Rear-Admiral	Rear-Admiral - Royal Navy	Gerald C. Dickens	1944–1945	ret. Adm recommissioned as Radm.

==== Flag Officer-in-Charge, Kiel ====
	Rank	Flag	Name	Term	Notes/Ref
Flag Officer-in-Charge, Kiel
1	Rear-Admiral	Rear-Admiral - Royal Navy	Harold Tom Baillie-Grohman	1944–1945	title changed to FOS-H

==== Flag Officer, Norway ====
	Rank	Flag	Name	Term	Notes/Ref
Flag Officer, Norway
1	Rear-Admiral	Rear-Admiral - Royal Navy	James Stewart McClaren Ritchie	1944–1945	

==== Flag Officer, Schleswig-Holstein ====
	Rank	Flag	Name	Term	Notes/Ref
Flag Officer, Schleswig-Holstein
1	Rear-Admiral	Rear-Admiral - Royal Navy	Harold Tom Baillie-Grohman	1945–1946	

==== Flag Officer, Western Germany ====
	Rank	Flag	Name	Term	Notes/Ref
Flag Officer, Western Germany
1	Rear-Admiral	Rear-Admiral - Royal Navy	G. C. Muirhead-Gould	1945–1946	

==== Flag Officer, Wilhelmshaven ====
	Rank	Flag	Name	Term	Notes/Ref
Flag Officer, Wilhelmshaven
1	Rear-Admiral	Rear-Admiral - Royal Navy	G. C. Muirhead-Gould	1944–1945	title changed to FOWG

===== Commodore-in-Charge, Hamburg =====
	Rank	Flag	Name	Term	Notes/Ref
Commodore-in-Charge, Hamburg
1	Commodore		Hugh England	1944–1945	

=== Vice-Admiral Commanding, British Naval Forces, Germany ===
	Rank	Flag	Name	Term	Notes/Ref
Vice-Admiral Commanding, British Naval Forces, Germany
1	Vice-Admiral	Vice-Admiral - Royal Navy	Sir Harold T.C. Walker	March 1946-June 1947	

=== Flag Officer Commanding, British Naval Forces, Germany ===
	Rank	Flag	Name	Term	Notes/Ref
Flag Officer Commanding, British Naval Forces, Germany
1	Rear-Admiral	Rear-Admiral - Royal Navy	Stephen H. T. Arliss	June 1947 – August 1949	
2	Rear-Admiral	Rear-Admiral - Royal Navy	Archibald Day	August 1949 – April 1950	
3	Rear-Admiral	Rear-Admiral - Royal Navy	Lachlan D. Mackintosh	April–November 1950	
4	Rear-Admiral	Rear-Admiral - Royal Navy	George W. G. Simpson	November 1950 – -May 1951	

=== Flag Officer, Germany ===
	Rank	Flag	Name	Term	Notes/Ref
Flag Officer, Germany
1	Rear-Admiral	Rear-Admiral - Royal Navy	George W. G. Simpson	May–November 1951	
2	Rear-Admiral	Rear-Admiral - Royal Navy	Robert St. V. Sherbrooke	November 1951 – November 1953	
3	Rear-Admiral	Rear-Admiral - Royal Navy	Robert S. Warne	November 1953 – March 1955	
4	Rear-Admiral	Rear-Admiral - Royal Navy	Keith McN. Campbell-Walter	March 1955 – May 1958	
5	Rear-Admiral	Rear-Admiral - Royal Navy	Michael S. Townsend	May 1958 – 1961	

== Units and shore establishments ==
Shore establishments and units in Germany at various times from 1945 included:

Location	Unit	In command	Dates	Notes/Ref
Berlin	HQ HMS Royal Prince	Flag Officer, Berlin	March–August 1945	shore establishment
Hamburg	HQ HMS Royal Alfred	Flag Officer-in-Charge, Hamburg	1944	shore establishment
Kiel/Travemünde	HQ HMS Royal Alfred	Flag Officer-in-Charge, Kiel	1945–1946	shore establishment
Ploen	HQ HMS Royal Alfred	Flag Officer, Schleswig Holstein	1945–1946	shore establishment
Wilhelmshaven	HQ HMS Royal Katherine	Flag Officer, Wilhelmshaven	1944–1945	shore establishment
Wilhelmshaven	HQ HMS Royal Katherine	Flag Officer, Western Germany	1945–1946	shore establishment
Kiel/Travemünde	HQ HMS Royal Alfred	Senior Naval Officer Schleswig Holstein	1945–1946	shore establishment
Bad Oeynhausen	HQ British Army on the Rhine	Royal Navy Representative C-in-C Committee, Germany	1958	
Berlin	HQ HMS Princess Irene	Senior Naval Officer, Royal Navy Headquarters, Germany		shore establishment
Brunsbüttel	HMS Princess Louise		1945–1946	shore establishment
Cuxhaven	Minesweeping Unit	Control Commission Germany	1948–1951	
Cuxhaven	Elbe Squadron	Commanding Officer, Elbe Squadron		
Cuxhaven	HMS Augusta		1945–1946	administrative unit ms
Cuxhaven	HQ HMS Royal Albert	Naval Officer-in-Charge, Cuxhaven	1945–1948	accounting base
Eckernförde	HQ HMS Princess Caroline		1945–1946	shore establishment
Flensburg	HQ HMS Royal Alexandra	Naval Officer-in-Charge, Flensburg	1945–1946	shore establishment
Flensburg	HQ HMS Royal Alexandra	Senior Naval Officer-in-Charge, Flensburg	1946–1947	shore establishment
Kiel	British Baltic Fishery Protection Service		1949–1955	covert intelligence unit
Kiel	HQ Land Commissioner, Schleswig-Holstein	Naval Liaison Officer to LC, Schleswig-Holstein		
Kiel	HMS Royal Charlotte	Senior Officer Intelligence Kiel	1945	intelligence unit
Kiel	HMS Royal Harold	Naval Officer-in-Charge, Kiel	1945–1948	shore establishment
Krefeld	Rhine Flotilla	Commanding Officer, Rhine Flotilla	1950	
Krefeld	Rhine Squadron	Commanding Officer, Rhine Squadron	1954	
Lübeck	HQ Royal Caroline	Naval Officer in Charge, Lubeck	1945–1946	shore establishment
Lübeck	1 Commando Brigade	Commander 1st Commando Brigade	May–July 1945	Royal Marines
Sylt	HMS Royal Adelaide	Naval Officer-in-Charge, Sylt	May–October 1945	shore establishment
Tonning	HMS Royal Adelaide		1945–1946	shore establishment
Travemünde	HMS Royal Caroline			shore establishment
Wilhelmshaven	HQ HMS Royal Rupert	Naval Officer in Charge, Wilhelmshaven	1945–1950	shore establishment
