= Operation Zipper =

British plan to capture either Port Swettenham or Port Dickson, Malaya, in 1945

- Part of South-East Asian theatre of World War II
- Planned by: South East Asia Command
- Objective: Liberation of Malaya and Singapore
- Outcome: Scaled down into Operation Tiderace for the liberation of Singapore and Operation Jurist for the liberation of Penang.

Operation Zipper was a World War II British plan to capture either Port Swettenham or Port Dickson, Malaya, as staging areas for the recapture of Singapore in Operation Mailfist. However, due to the end of the war in the Pacific, it was never fully executed. Some of the proposed landings on Penang went ahead as planned to probe Japanese intentions, encountering no resistance. The planned deception for this attack was called Operation Slippery, whilst a small Special Operations Executive team led by Tun Ibrahim Ismail which landed in October 1944 managed to convince the Japanese that the landings were to be on the Isthmus of Kra, 650 miles (1,050 km) to the north.

Operations Jurist and Tiderace were put into action following the surrender of Japan, with the objectives of directly liberating Penang and Singapore respectively, followed by smaller amphibious landings on the coast of Selangor and Negeri Sembilan. Two Allied fleets set sail from Rangoon, with the Royal Navy's Task Force 11 headed for Penang under Operation Jurist, while the larger British and French fleet sailed on to Singapore under Operation Tiderace. The earlier liberation of Penang was intended to test Japanese intentions as a prelude to the eventual recapture of Singapore and the rest of Malaya.

The Japanese garrison in Penang surrendered on 2 September and the Royal Marines recaptured George Town the following day. Meanwhile, the Allied fleet arrived off Singapore on 4 September and accepted the surrender of the Japanese forces stationed on the island. A formal surrender ceremony was held in downtown Singapore on 12 September.

On 9 September, troops of the 25th Indian Division were landed in Selangor and Negeri Sembilan, capturing Port Dickson. After some delays, the Commonwealth force reached Kuala Lumpur on 12 September.

== Bibliography ==
- Bose, Romen, "The End of the War: Singapore's Liberation and the aftermath of the Second World War", Marshall Cavendish, Singapore, 2005
- Christopher Bayly & Tim Harper, "Forgotten Wars: Freedom And Revolution in Southeast Asia", Penguin Group, United Kingdom, 2006, ISBN 978-0-674-02153-2, ISBN 0-674-02153-3
