= Harold Walker (Royal Navy officer) =

Royal Navy officer (1891–1975)

Admiral Sir Harold Walker KCB
- Born: 18 March 1891
- Died: 25 December 1975 (aged 84)
- Military career
- Allegiance: United Kingdom
- Branch: Royal Navy
- Service years: 1903–1948
- Rank: Admiral
- Commands: HMS Hood; HMS Barham; 5th Cruiser Squadron; 3rd Battle Squadron; British Naval Forces in Germany
- Conflicts: World War I World War I
- Awards: Knight Commander of the Order of the Bath

Admiral Sir Harold Thomas Coulthard Walker (18 March 1891 – 25 December 1975) was a Royal Navy officer who commanded the 3rd Battle Squadron.

== Naval career ==
Walker joined the Royal Navy in 1903. He served in World War I and saw action during the Zeebrugge Raid in 1918, losing an arm. He became Deputy Director of Training and Staff Duties at the Admiralty in 1936, commanding officer of the battlecruiser HMS Hood in 1938 and commanding officer of the battleship HMS Barham in 1939. He also served in World War II becoming Commodore at Portsmouth Dockyard in 1940 and Director of Personal Services at the Admiralty in 1941. In August 1941, by now a rear-admiral, he presided over the second inquiry into the sinking of HMS Hood, which came to the same conclusion as the first inquiry.

In 1944 he became officer commanding the 5th Cruiser Squadron, then Vice-Admiral Commanding the 3rd Battle Squadron and Second in Command of the East Indies Fleet until 1945. After the War he became Commander of British Naval Forces Germany in 1946 before retiring in 1947.
