= Operation Tiderace =

British reclamation of Singapore from Japanese occupation

- Part of World War II
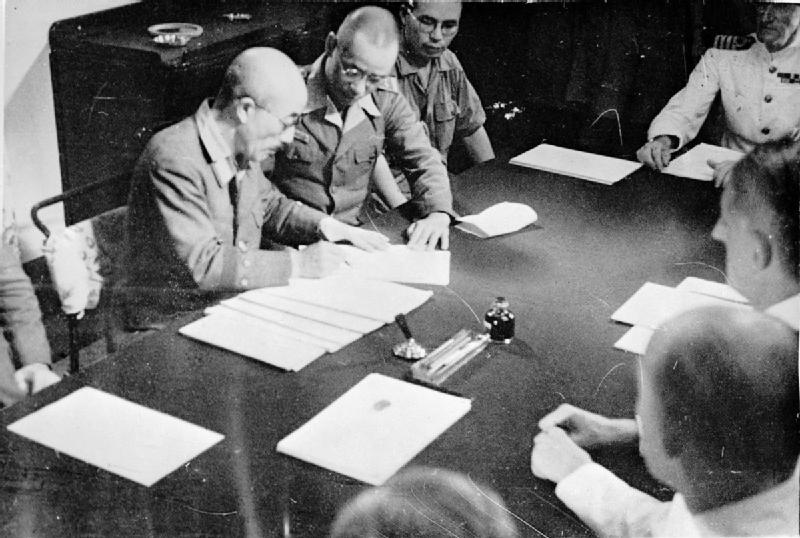
- General Seishirō Itagaki signing the terms for the reoccupation of Singapore on board the heavy cruiser HMS Sussex. 4 September 1945
Date	4–12 September 1945
Location	Singapore
Result	Unopposed Allied victory: Liberation of Singapore; Establishment of British Military Administration; Dissolution of Straits Settlements in 1946

Belligerents
Japan: (Empire of Japan) 7th Area Army; (Empire of Japan) 10th Area Fleet	United Kingdom; India; Australia; France (Naval only)

Commanders and leaders
(Empire of Japan) Seishirō Itagaki (POW) (Empire of Japan) Shigeru Fukudome (POW)	(United Kingdom) Lord Louis Mountbatten (United Kingdom) Robert Mansergh

Strength
77,000 infantry 2 heavy cruisers 1 destroyer 2 submarines	60,000 infantry 7 escort carriers 2 battleships 1 heavy cruiser 2 light cruisers 15 destroyers 3 Royal Fleet Auxiliary; 3 hospital ships 14 merchant vessels 43 landing ship, infantry

Casualties and losses
300 suicides 76,700 captured	1 battleship damaged

Operation Tiderace was the codename of the British plan to retake Singapore following the Japanese surrender in 1945. The liberation force was led by Lord Louis Mountbatten, Supreme Allied Commander of South East Asia Command. Tiderace was initiated in coordination with Operation Zipper, which involved the liberation of Malaya.

== Background ==
With the Soviet invasion of Manchuria and an American planned invasion of Japan, South East Asia Command were also drawing up plans to invade Malaya, codenamed Operation Zipper. With over 100,000 Allied infantry, the plan was to capture Port Swettenham and Port Dickson, and would involve an airstrike of more than 500 aircraft of the Royal Air Force. The assault was scheduled for 9 September 1945, but was forestalled following the Surrender of Japan on 15 August 1945. Once the lodgement was secure, the Allies would have initiated Operation Mailfist, during which ground forces were to advance south through Malaya and liberate Singapore. It was expected that Operation Mailfist would begin in December 1945 and conclude in March 1946.

Operation Tiderace was planned soon after the Atomic bombings of Hiroshima and Nagasaki on 6 and 9 August. Emergency planning was put in preparation for the rapid occupation of Singapore at an early date should Japan agree to accept the terms of the Potsdam Declaration of 26 July.

While Operation Zipper was executed ahead of schedule, it did so on a much smaller scale, having quickly transferred a proportion of its original strength to Operation Tiderace. The convoy consisted of about 90 ships, which included two battleships, HMS Nelson and the French battleship Richelieu. The heavy cruiser HMS Sussex served as the flagship. HMAS Hawkesbury was the sole Australian warship during the Japanese surrender, escorting the repatriation transport Duntroon. A smaller British naval force was given the task of liberating Penang under Operation Jurist, a component of the overall Operation Zipper.

There were a total of seven escort carriers: HMS Ameer, HMS Attacker, HMS Emperor, HMS Empress, HMS Hunter, HMS Khedive and HMS Stalker.

The Japanese naval fleet in Singapore consisted of the destroyer Kamikaze and two cruisers, Myōkō and Takao, both of which had been so badly damaged before that they were being used as floating anti-aircraft batteries. Two ex-German U-boats, I-501 and I-502 were also in Singapore. Both were moored at Singapore Naval Base. Air strength in both Malaya and Sumatra was estimated to be a little more than 170 aircraft.

== Return to Singapore ==
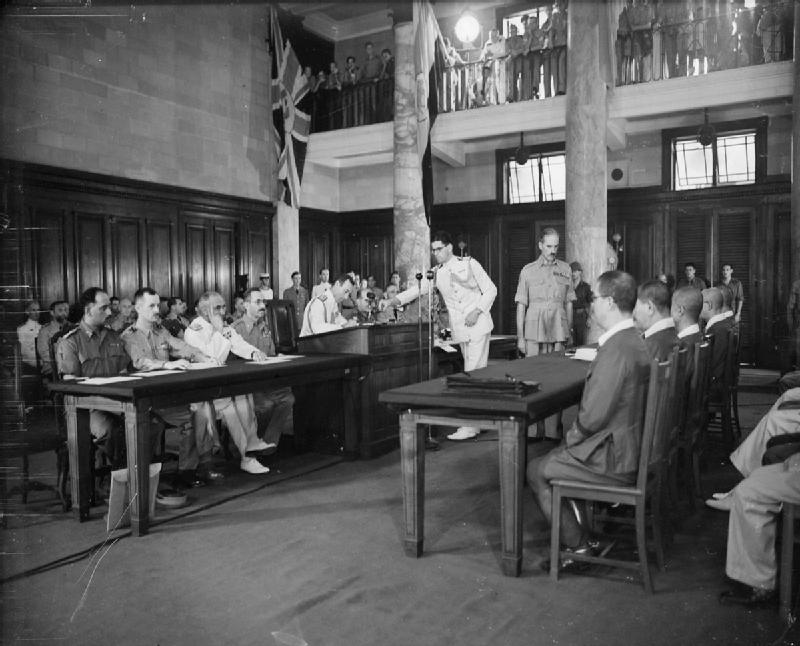
Admiral Lord Louis Mountbatten signs the acceptance of surrender for Great Britain. Brigadier (later Gen.) Thimayya (future Chief of Staff of the Indian Army) is visible on the far left of the Allied table representing Indian forces. 12 September 1945

Operation Tiderace commenced when Mountbatten ordered Allied troops to set sail from Trincomalee and Rangoon on 31 August for Singapore. The fleet was not armed with offensive weapons as Mountbatten had good reason to believe that the Japanese in Malaya and Singapore would surrender without a fight: on 20 August General Itagaki Seishiro, the commander in Singapore, had signalled Mountbatten that he would abide by his emperor's decision and was ready to receive instructions for the Japanese surrender of Singapore.

Japan's defeat had caught the Japanese Command in Singapore by surprise. Many were unwilling to surrender and had vowed to fight to the death. Itagaki had initially balked at the order to surrender and instead ordered the 25th Army (the component of the 7th Area Army defending Singapore) to resist when the Allies arrived. There was even a secret plan to massacre all Allied PoWs on the island. However, three days after the Emperor's announcement on 15 August, Itagaki flew from Singapore to Saigon to confer with his leader Field Marshal Count Terauchi, Commander of the Japanese Southern Army and all forces in South-east Asia. Terauchi prevailed over Itagaki who then sent his signal to Mountbatten. Newspapers in Singapore were finally allowed to carry the text of the Emperor's speech, confirming what many already knew from listening to All India Radio broadcasts from Delhi on forbidden shortwave radios.

The Allies arrived in Malaya on 28 August, with a small portion of the fleet sent to recapture Penang as part of Operation Jurist. On 30 August 1945 a flight of 9 RAAF Catalinas landed in Singapore bearing medical supplies and personnel documents in preparation for the Japanese surrender and the liberation of the thousands of PoWs on the island. When Penang surrendered without resistance under Operation Jurist, the Allied fleet sailed for Singapore on 2 September, passing the Raffles Lighthouse at the Southern entrance to the Straits of Malacca. The fleet arrived in Singapore on 4 September 1945, meeting no opposition. However, the French battleship Richelieu struck a magnetic mine at 07:44 on 9 September while passing down the Straits of Malacca. She eventually limped into Singapore at 12:00 on 11 September.

General Itagaki, accompanied by Vice Admiral Shigeru Fukudome and his aides, were brought aboard HMS Sussex in Keppel Harbour to discuss the surrender. They were received by Lieutenant-General Sir Philip Christison and Major-General Robert Mansergh. A tense encounter began when a Japanese officer reportedly remarked, "You are two hours late," only to be met with the reply, "We don't keep Tokyo time here." By 18:00, the Japanese had surrendered their forces on the island. An estimated 77,000 Japanese troops from Singapore were captured, plus another 26,000 from Malaya.

The formal surrender was finalised on 12 September at Singapore City Hall. Lord Louis Mountbatten, Supreme Allied Commander of Southeast Asia Command, came to Singapore to receive the formal surrender of Japanese forces in South East Asia from General Itagaki on behalf of Field Marshal Hisaichi Terauchi, commander of the Japanese Southern Army Group who had suffered a stroke earlier in the year. A British Military Administration was formed to govern the island until March 1946. Itagaki departed for Japan shortly afterwards to face trial and execution as a war criminal.

== Japanese reaction to the surrender ==
Itagaki had met his generals and senior staff at his HQ at the former Raffles College in Bukit Timah and told his men that they would have to obey the surrender instructions and keep the peace. That night, more than 300 officers and men killed themselves by falling onto their swords in the Raffles Hotel after a farewell sake party, and later, an entire Japanese platoon killed themselves using grenades.

About 200 Japanese soldiers decided to join the communist guerrillas whom they were fighting just days before in a bid to continue the fight against the British. But they soon returned to their units when they found out that the MPAJA, which was funded by the Malayan Communist Party, did not plan to fight the returning British.

Nonetheless, some stayed hidden in the jungles with the communists, and when Chin Peng and remnants of the Malayan Communist Party ended their struggle in 1989, two former Japanese soldiers called Tanaka and Hashimoto emerged from the jungle with the communists and surrendered.

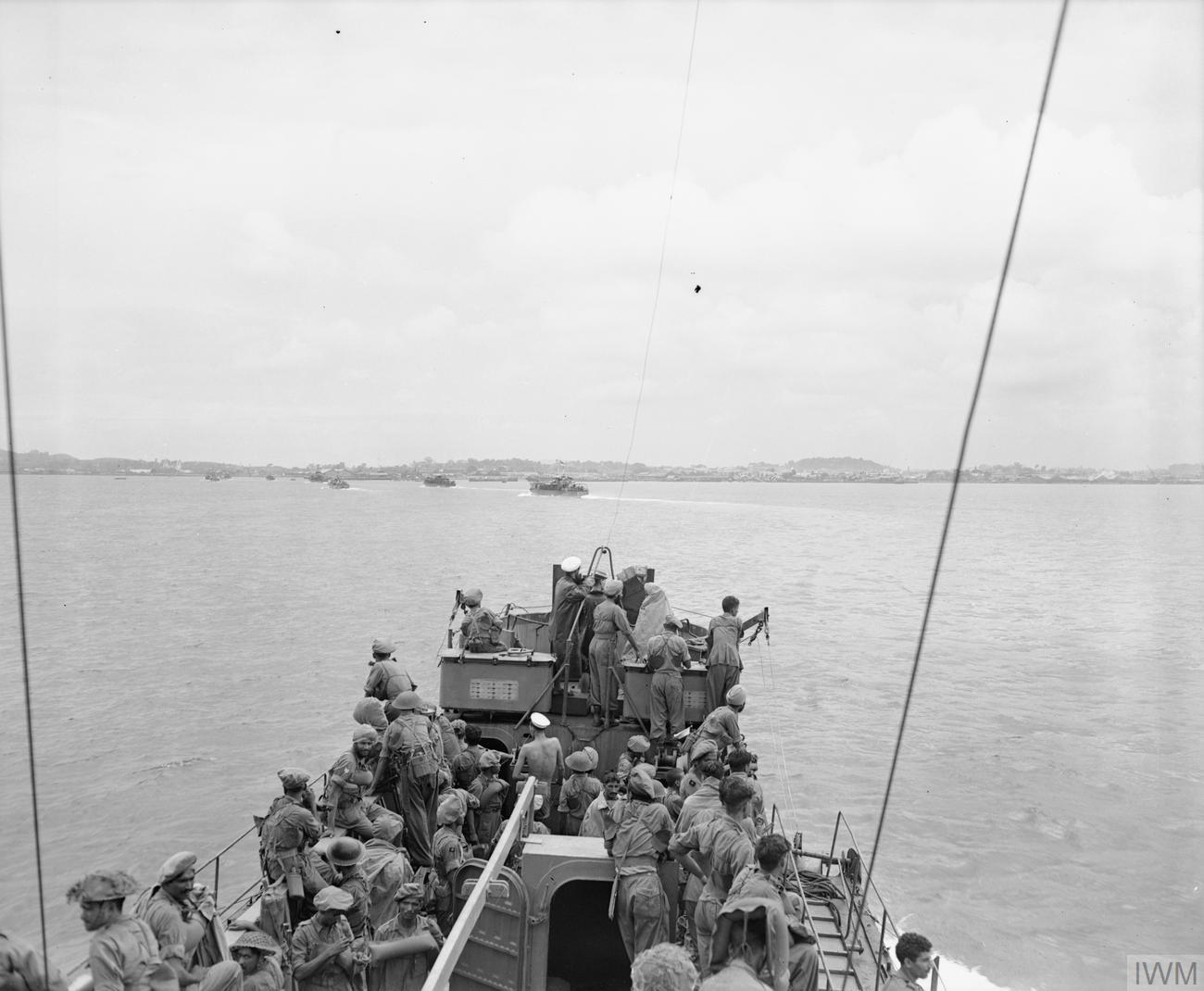
A convoy of landing craft carrying Indian troops entering the bay at Singapore, 1945.

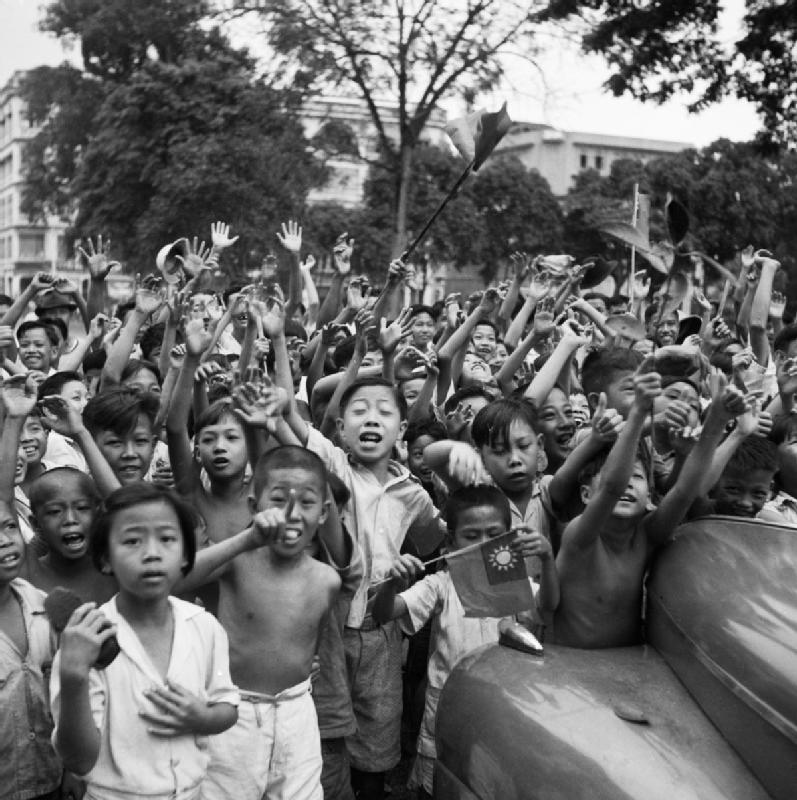
Children of Singapore cheer the arrival of the 5th Indian Division, 5 September 1945.

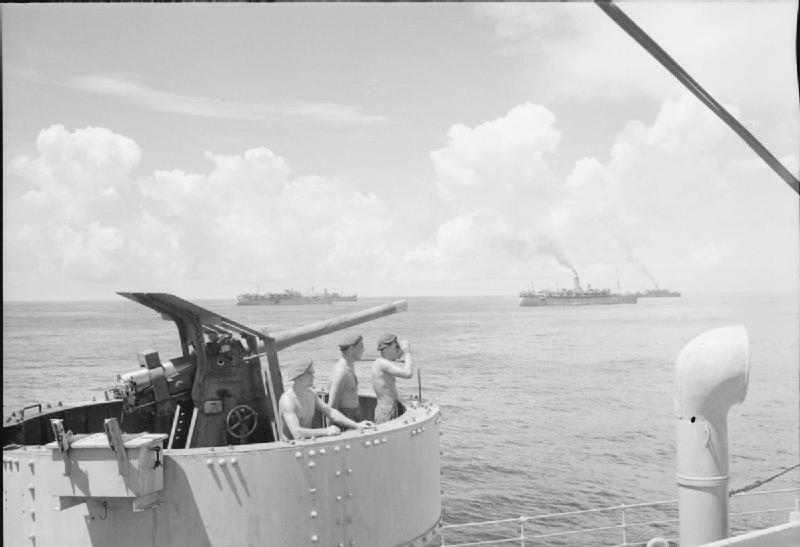
Ships of the occupation convoy en route to Singapore, August 1945

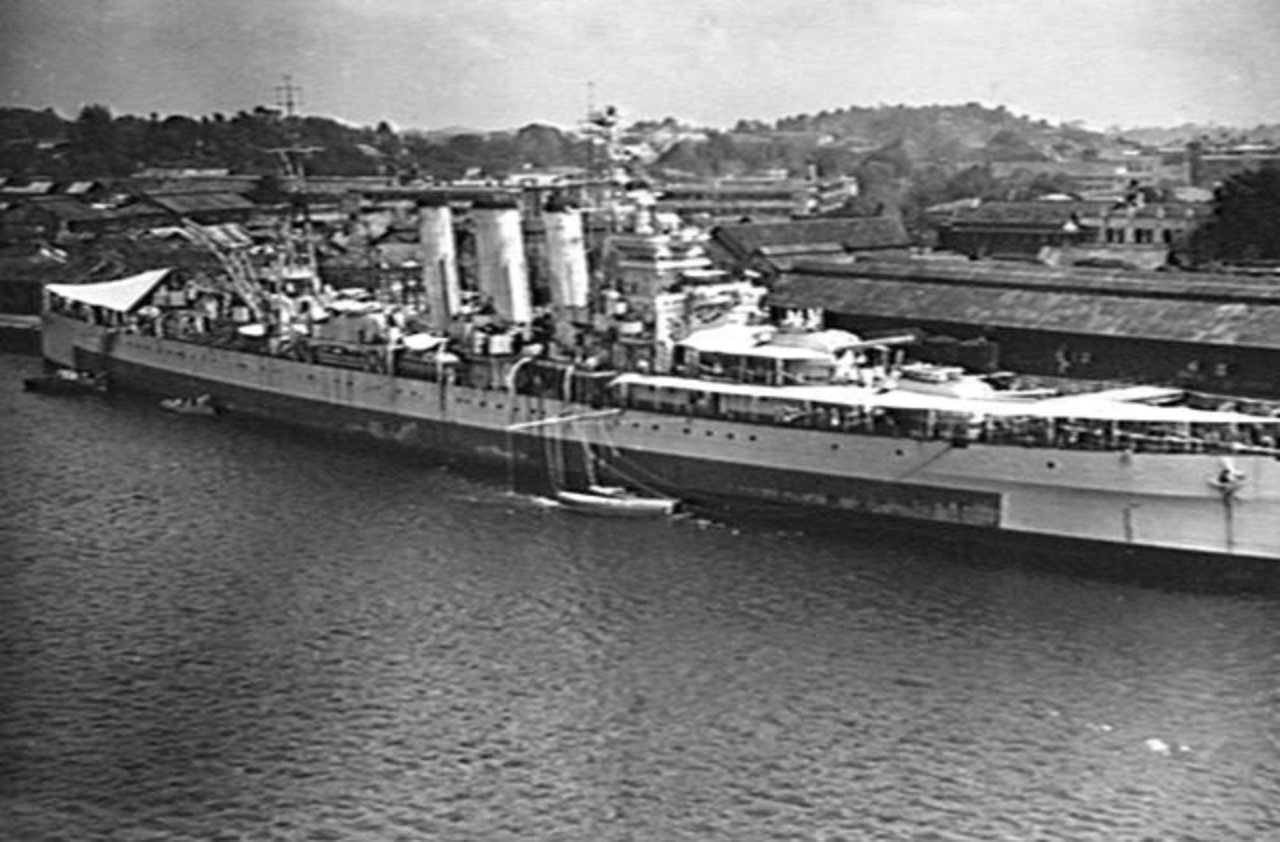
HMS Sussex docked in Singapore on 12 September 1945

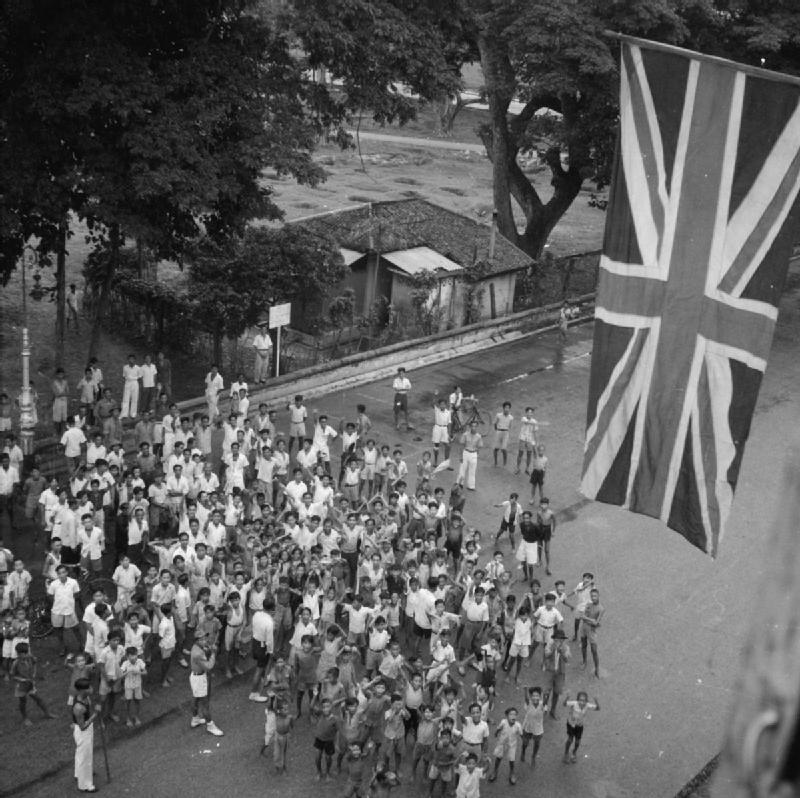
Cheering schoolchildren welcome the return of the British Army on 5 September 1945

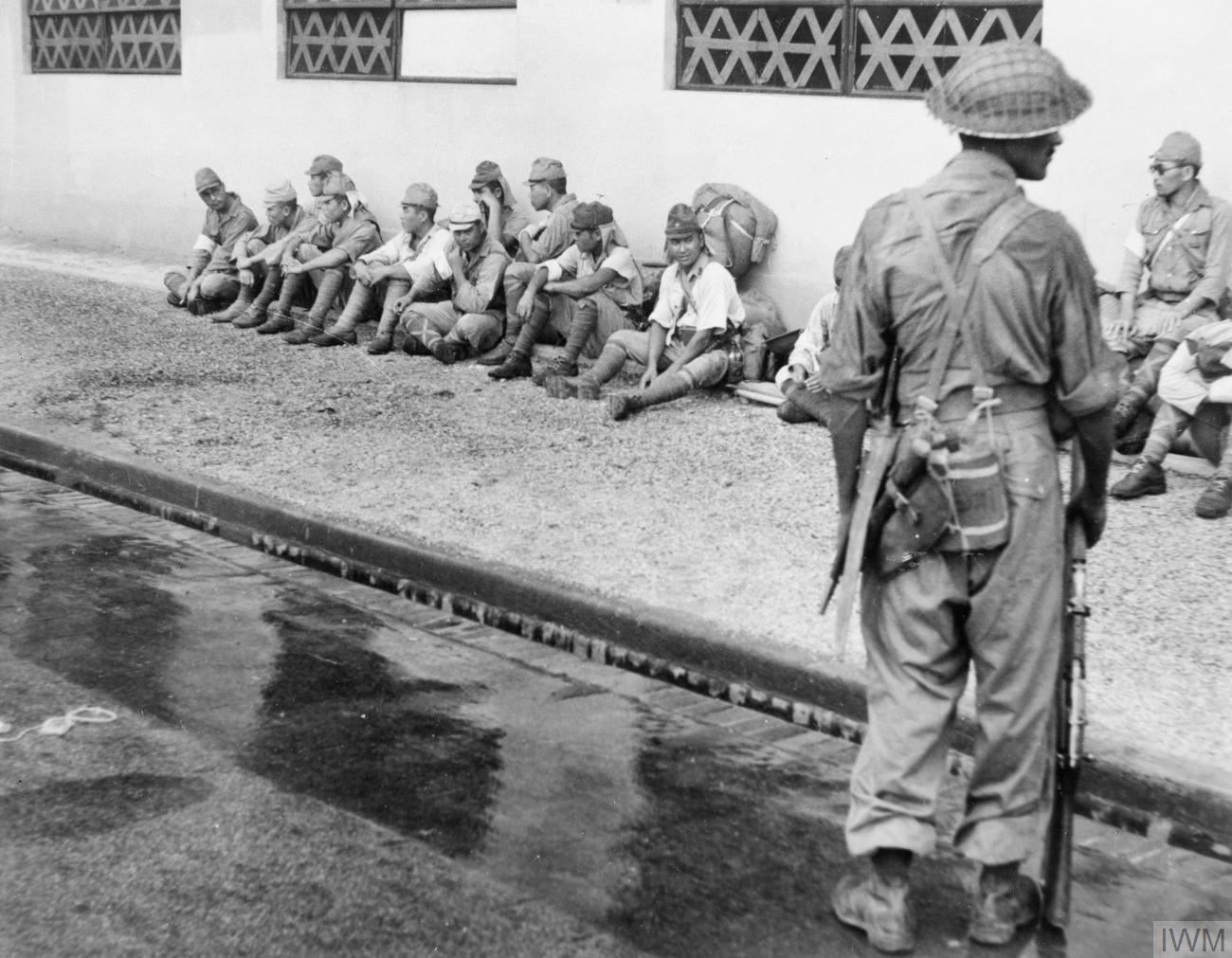
A soldier from the 5th Indian Division stands guard over Japanese prisoners

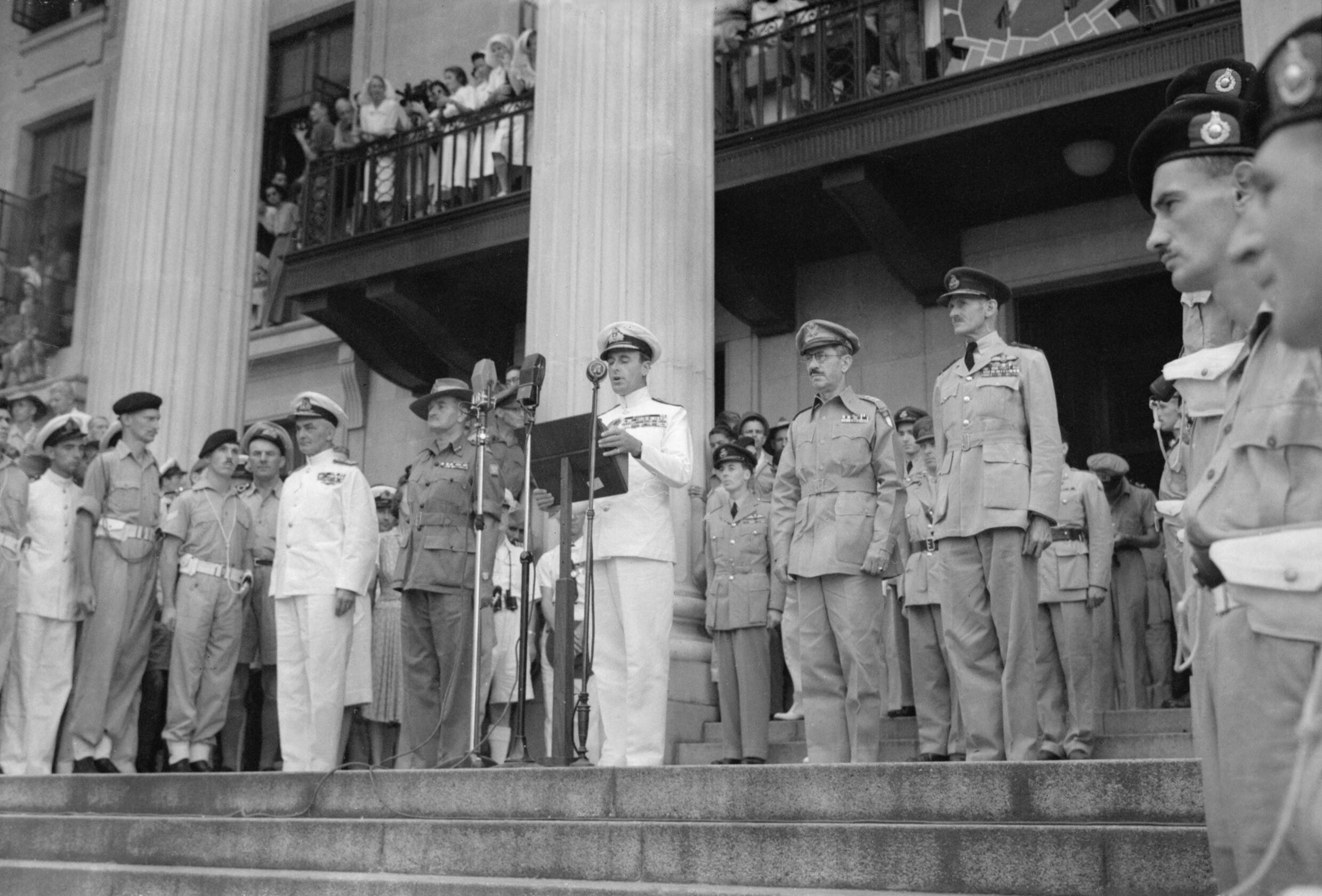
Mountbatten gives a public address in Singapore during the surrender ceremony

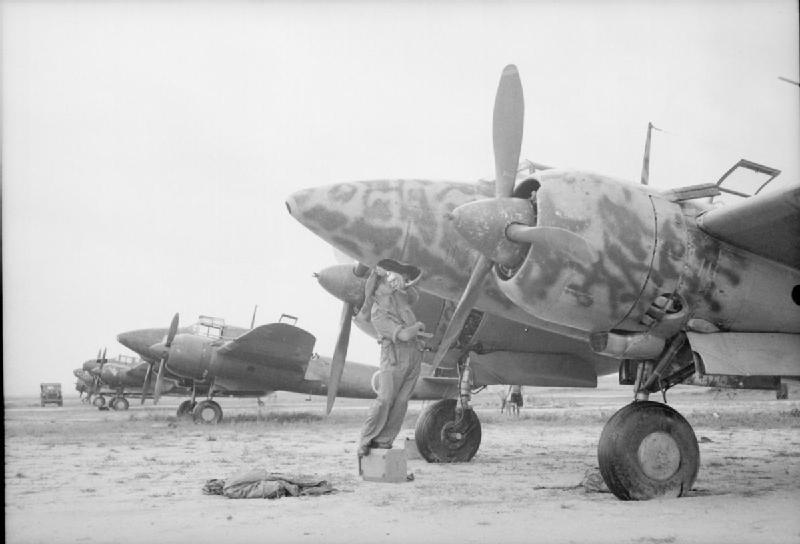
Abandoned Japanese Ki-45 Toryu fighters captured at Kallang Airfield

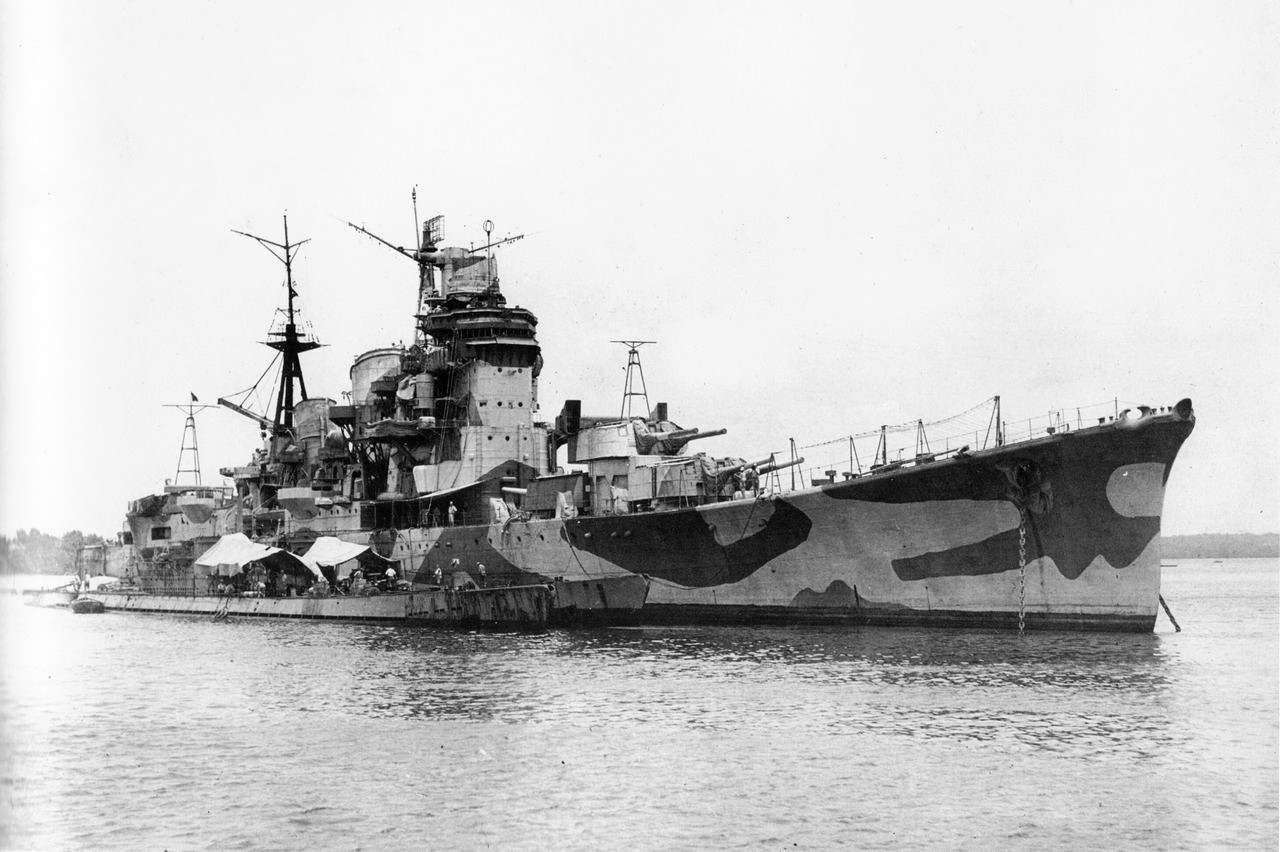
Surrendered Heavy cruiser Myōkō moored at Seletar alongside submarines I-501 and I-502

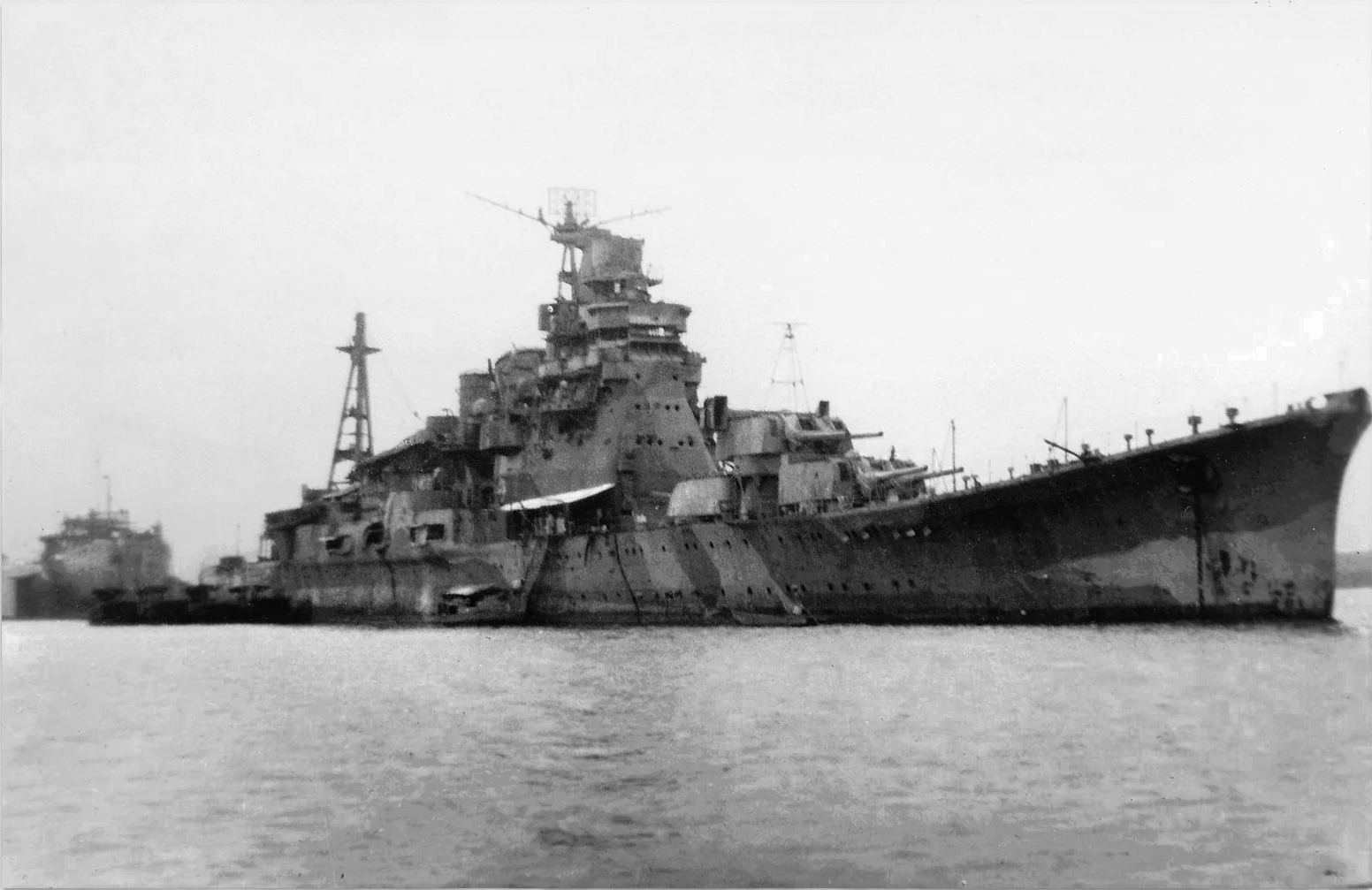
Heavy cruiser Takao, surrendered to British forces at Seletar, Singapore

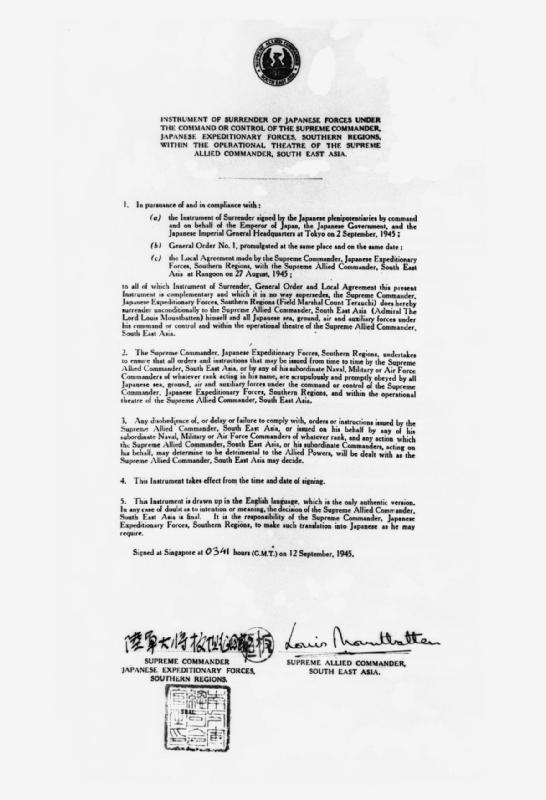
Instrument of Surrender signed by Admiral Lord Louis Mountbatten for the Allies and General Itagaki for the Japanese

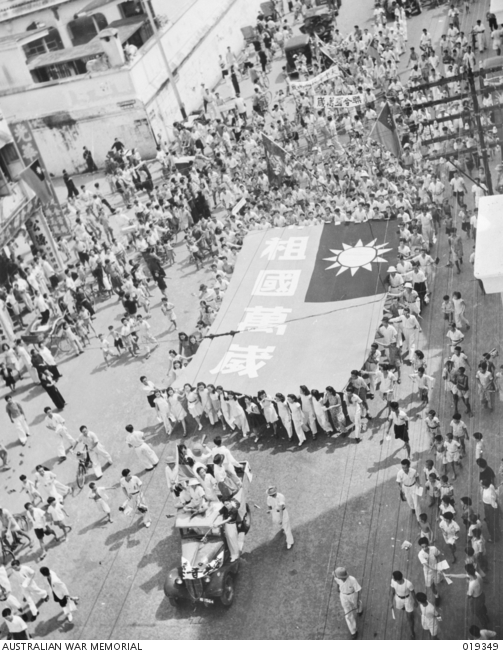
Chinese community holding preliminary celebrations through the city streets, with liberation banners

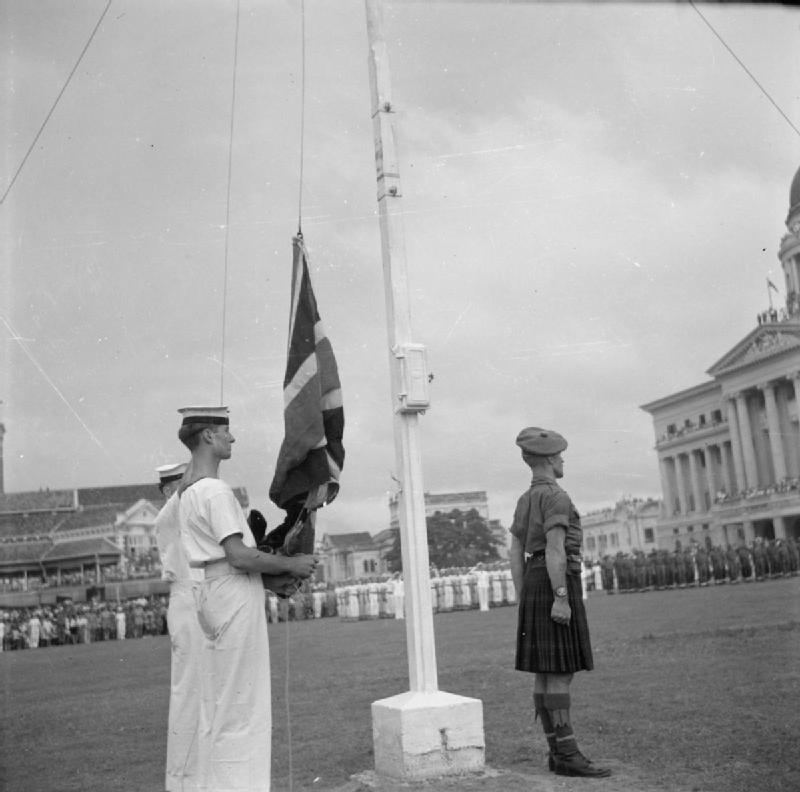
Union Jack is hoisted during the formal surrender of all Japanese southern armies

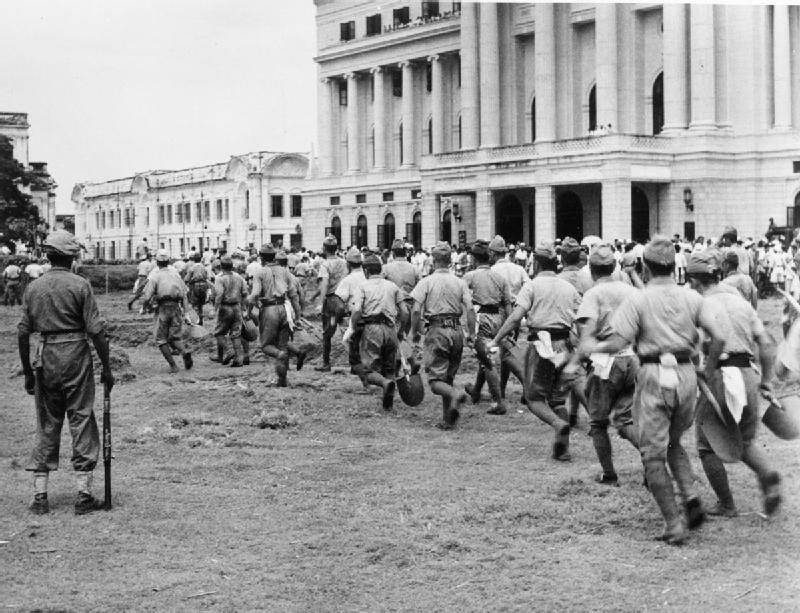
Japanese POWs are taken to work where they were made to clear up the city

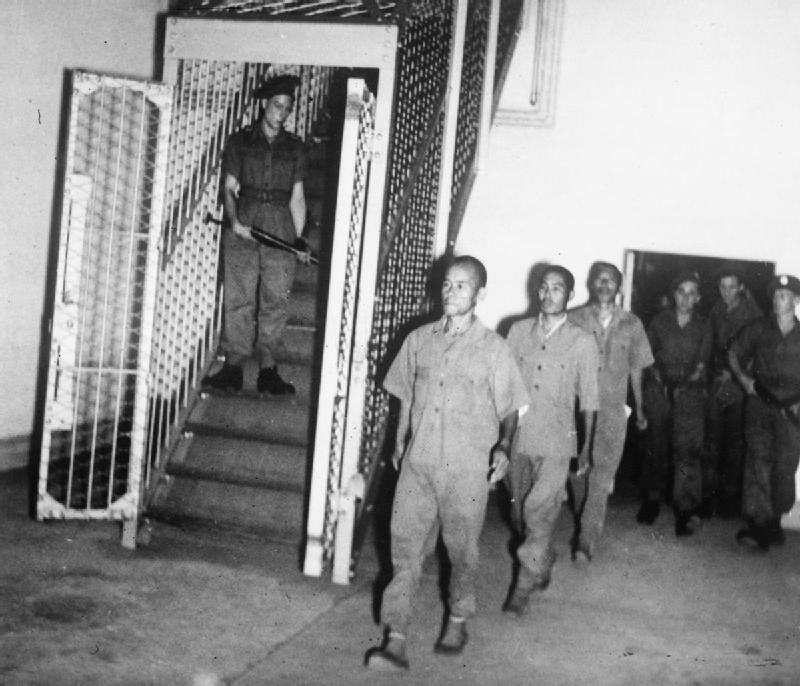
Three of the indicted Japanese war criminals are led to their cells underneath the Supreme Court in Singapore

== See also ==
- History of Singapore
- Japanese occupation of Singapore
- Hasuda Zenmei
