= Gerard Muirhead-Gould =

British admiral (1889–1945)

Rear-Admiral Gerard Muirhead-Gould DSC
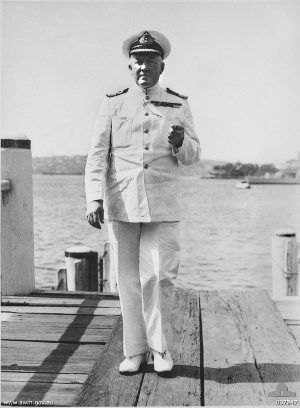
- Commodore Muirhead-Gould in May 1941
- Born: 29 May 1889; London, England
- Died: 26 June 1945 (aged 56); Wilhelmshaven, Germany
- Military career
- Allegiance: United Kingdom
- Branch: Royal Navy
- Service years: 1904–1945
- Rank: Rear-Admiral
- Commands: Flag Officer, Western Germany (1945–1946); Flag Officer, Wilhelmshaven (1944–1945); Flag Officer-in-Charge Sydney (1940–44); HMS Devonshire (1936–39); HMS Active (1932–33); HMS Bluebell (1926–27)
- Conflicts: First World War; Second World War
- Awards: Distinguished Service Cross; Mentioned in Despatches; Legion of Honour (France); Order of the Redeemer (Greece)

Rear-Admiral Gerard Charles Muirhead-Gould, DSC (29 May 1889 – 26 June 1945) was an officer of the Royal Navy.

== Early life and career ==
Muirhead-Gould was born in London on 29 May 1889, the son of Arthur Lewis Gould and Emily Gertrude Lilias Muirhead. He joined the Royal Naval Cadets in January 1904. During the First World War, he was awarded the Distinguished Service Cross, a Chevalier (Knight) of the French Legion of Honour and a Chevalier of the Greek Order of the Redeemer. Between 1933 and 1936, Muirhead-Gould was a member of the Naval Intelligence Division, assigned to the British Embassy in Berlin. During this time he kept Winston Churchill informed of the German military buildup, particularly in relation to the Treaty of Versailles and the later Anglo-German Naval Agreement.

== Second World War ==
During the Second World War, a heart condition prevented Muirhead-Gould from going to sea. The sinking of British battleship HMS Royal Oak on 14 October 1939, while at anchor in Scapa Flow by German submarine U-47 resulted in an Admiralty Board of Inquiry into how a submarine could have penetrated the harbour's defences and what could be done to prevent a recurrence. Muirhead-Gould, then a commander, was one of the three senior officers on the Board.

In February 1940, Muirhead-Gould became the Naval Officer in command of Sydney Harbour, a posting that lasted until September 1944, but he was not popular among the officers and sailors of the Royal Australian Navy under his command. He was the senior Allied officer during the relatively-unsuccessful Japanese midget submarine attack on Sydney Harbour. He did not take the reports of enemy submarines seriously and reportedly said: "What are you all playing at, running up and down the harbour dropping depth charges and talking about enemy subs in the harbour? There's not one to be seen". The crew reiterated that a submarine had been seen, but Muirhead-Gould remained unconvinced and before he left and added sarcastically, "If you see another sub, see if the captain has a black beard. I'd like to meet him."

At some point, Churchill considered Muirhead-Gould for the position of the Chief Director of the Secret Intelligence Service (MI6) although nothing came of that.

Muirhead-Gould's previous experience in Germany resulted in him being appointed Flag Officer, Wilhelmshaven, in 1944, and he transferred in May 1945 to the captured German naval base at Wilhelmshaven. His command was renamed Flag Officer, Western Germany. There, he suffered a fatal heart attack on 26 June 1945. Gerard Charles Muirhead-Gould was the 13th and last laird of Bredisholm (Scotland).
