= Operation Mailfist =

Planned Allied WWII liberation of Singapore

- Part of South-East Asian theatre of World War II
- Planned by: South East Asia Command
- Objective: Liberation of Malaya and Singapore
- Outcome: Did not take place; replaced by Operation Tiderace following the Japanese surrender.

Operation Mailfist was a planned Allied offensive to liberate Singapore from Japanese occupation during World War II. It was intended to follow on from the landing in Malaya, Operation Zipper, and take place between December 1945 and March 1946. Operation Mailfist was not conducted as Japan surrendered shortly before Operation Zipper was to have been launched. Instead, Singapore was re-occupied in the unopposed Operation Tiderace.

== History ==
During early 1945 the Allied South East Asia Command developed plans for the liberation of the British colonies of Malaya and Singapore, which had been captured by Japanese forces during the Malayan campaign and Battle of Singapore between December 1941 and February 1942. The plans called for a landing in October 1945 designated Operation Zipper near the towns of Port Swettenham and Port Dickson in north-west Malaya by two divisions and a brigade. Operation Mailfist was to be conducted once the lodgement was secure, using an additional two divisions and another brigade which were to be landed as soon as possible after the Operation Zipper units. This force would then advance south through Malaya and re-take Singapore. As Singapore was heavily protected, the forces scheduled to reinforce the British East Indies Fleet in late 1945 included the monitors HMS Abercrombie and Roberts which would have bombarded the island with their powerful guns.

It was expected that Operation Mailfist would commence in December 1945 and conclude in March 1946. An offensive to re-take northern Malaya, designated Operation Broadsword, was to be conducted at the same time as the advance towards Singapore.

The United States government opposed conducting military operations to liberate Malaya and Singapore on the grounds that the shipping and other resources used in the campaign would reduce those available for the planned invasion of Japan, Operation Downfall. However, the British government believed that it was necessary to liberate Singapore as early as possible on both military and political grounds.

Following the Japanese surrender, Operation Zipper was scaled down and brought forward, and was conducted in early September 1945 in order to rapidly liberate Malaya. Operation Mailfist was not conducted. Instead, it was replaced with Operation Tiderace during which an Allied fleet transported troops directly to Singapore and re-occupied the city in early September without encountering any opposition.
