= British Order of Battle at the Aden Emergency =

British military in Aden, 1963–1967

The following units of the British Armed Forces participated in the Aden Emergency (1963–67).

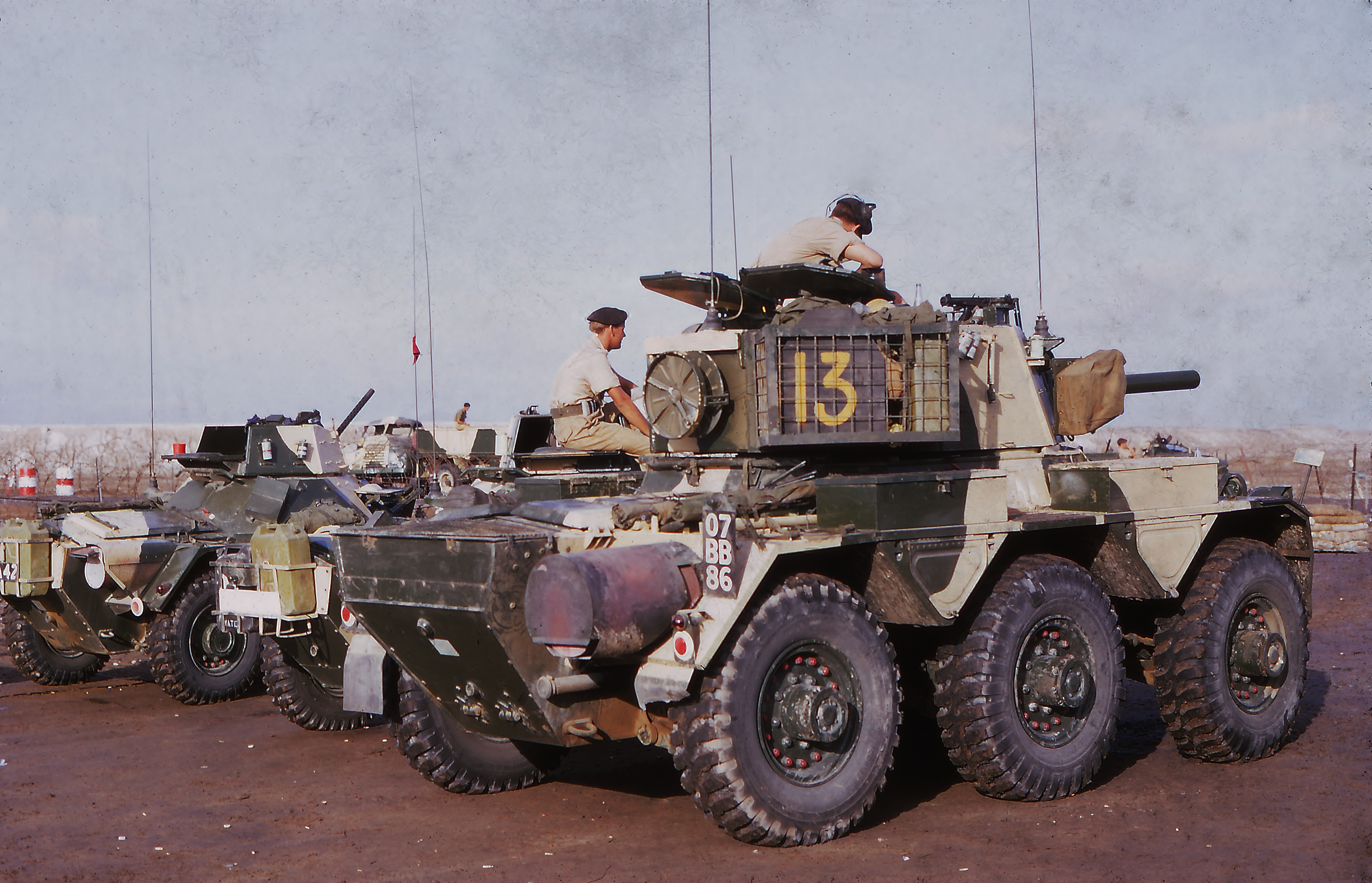
Saladin Armoured Cars of the Queens Dragoon Guards in Aden 1967

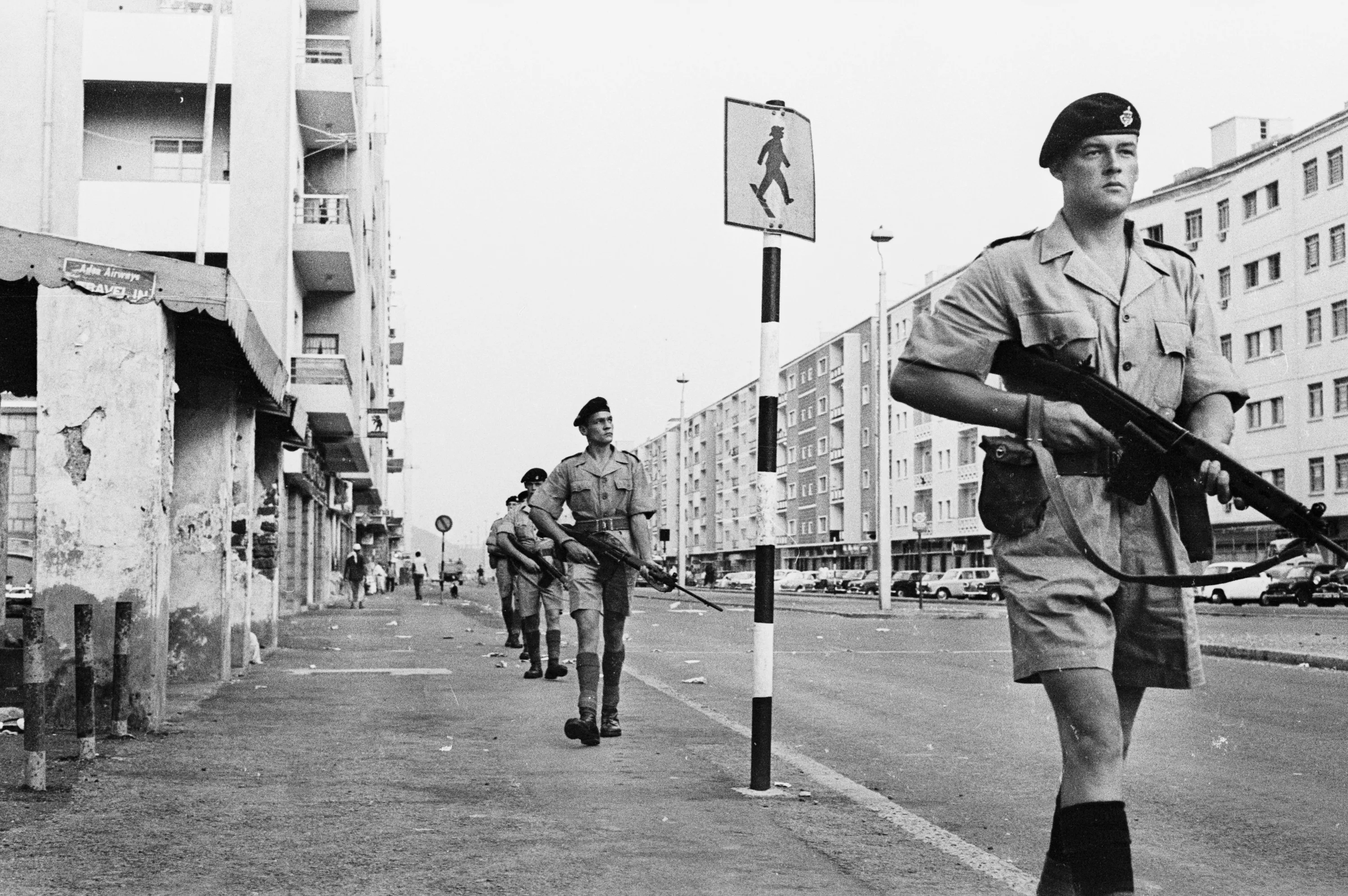
British street patrol in Aden 1967

== Royal Air Force ==
All based at RAF Khormaksar, Aden unless noted:

- No. 8 Squadron RAF with the Hawker Hunter FGA.9
- No. 21 Squadron RAF with the Scottish Aviation Twin Pioneer CC.1, Douglas Dakota & Hawker Siddeley Andover CC.2
- No. 26 Squadron RAF with the Bristol Belvedere HC.1 (1963-65)
- No. 36 Squadron RAF with the Lockheed C-130K Hercules C.1, based at RAF Lyneham
- No. 37 Squadron RAF with the Avro Shackleton MR.2
- No. 43 Squadron RAF with the Hunter FGA.9
- No. 78 Squadron RAF with the Twin Pioneer CC.1 & Wessex HC.2
- No. 84 Squadron RAF with the Blackburn Beverley C.1
- No. 105 Squadron RAF with the Armstrong Whitworth Argosy C.1
- No. 208 Squadron RAF with the Hunter FGA.9
- No. 233 Squadron RAF with the Vickers Valetta C.1
- No. 1417 (Fighter Reconnaissance) Flight RAF with the Hunter T.7 & FR.10
- Middle East Command Communication Squadron RAF with the English Electric Canberra B.2, Dakota C.4, Handley Page Hastings C.4 & Valetta C.2
- RAF Police Joint Service Command
- No. 123 Signals Unit RAF

RAF Regiment

- No. 2 Squadron RAF Regiment
- No. 27 Squadron RAF Regiment 1965/66?
- No. 34 Squadron RAF Regiment 1965?
- No. 37 Squadron RAF Regiment
- No. 48 Squadron RAF Regiment

== Royal Navy ==
Task Force 318 - consisted of 10 RFA vessels along with Royal Navy vessels as part of Operation Magister for the withdrawal from Aden.

- Ton-class minesweeper HMS Appleton - last Royal Navy vessel to leave Aden
- Retainer class armament stores ship RFA Resurgent
- Tide-class replenishment oiler RFA Tidespring
- Dale-class tanker RFA Dewdale
- Leander-class frigate HMS Minerva
- Leander-class frigate HMS Phoebe
- Leander-class frigate HMS Ajax
- Tribal-class frigate HMS Ashanti
- Battle-class destroyer HMS Barrosa
- C-class destroyer HMS Cambrian
- County-class destroyer HMS Hampshire
- County-class destroyer HMS London
- Round Table-class landing ship logistics RFA Sir Galahad
- Fearless-class landing platform dock HMS Fearless
- Fearless-class landing platform dock HMS Intrepid
- Audacious-class aircraft carrier HMS Eagle
  - 800 Naval Air Squadron with Buccaneer S.2s
  - 820 Naval Air Squadron
  - 899 Naval Air Squadron with Sea Vixen FAW.2s
- Centaur-class aircraft carrier HMS Albion
  - 846 Naval Air Squadron
  - 845 Naval Air Squadron
  - 848 Naval Air Squadron
- Centaur-class aircraft carrier HMS Bulwark
  - 847 Naval Air Squadron
  - 845 Naval Air Squadron
- Centaur-class aircraft carrier HMS Centaur
  - 892 Naval Air Squadron with Sea Vixen FAW.1s
  - 815 Naval Air Squadron
- Centaur-class aircraft carrier HMS Hermes
  - 892 Naval Air Squadron with Sea Vixen FAW.2's
  - 809 Naval Air Squadron
  - 826 Naval Air Squadron
- Amphion-class submarine HMS Auriga
- Illustrious-class aircraft carrier HMS Victorious
  - 801 Naval Air Squadron
  - 814 Naval Air Squadron
  - 893 Naval Air Squadron

Royal Marines

- 40 Commando
- 42 Commando
- 45 Commando
  - 'X' Company
  - 'Y' Company
  - 'Z' Company

== British Army ==
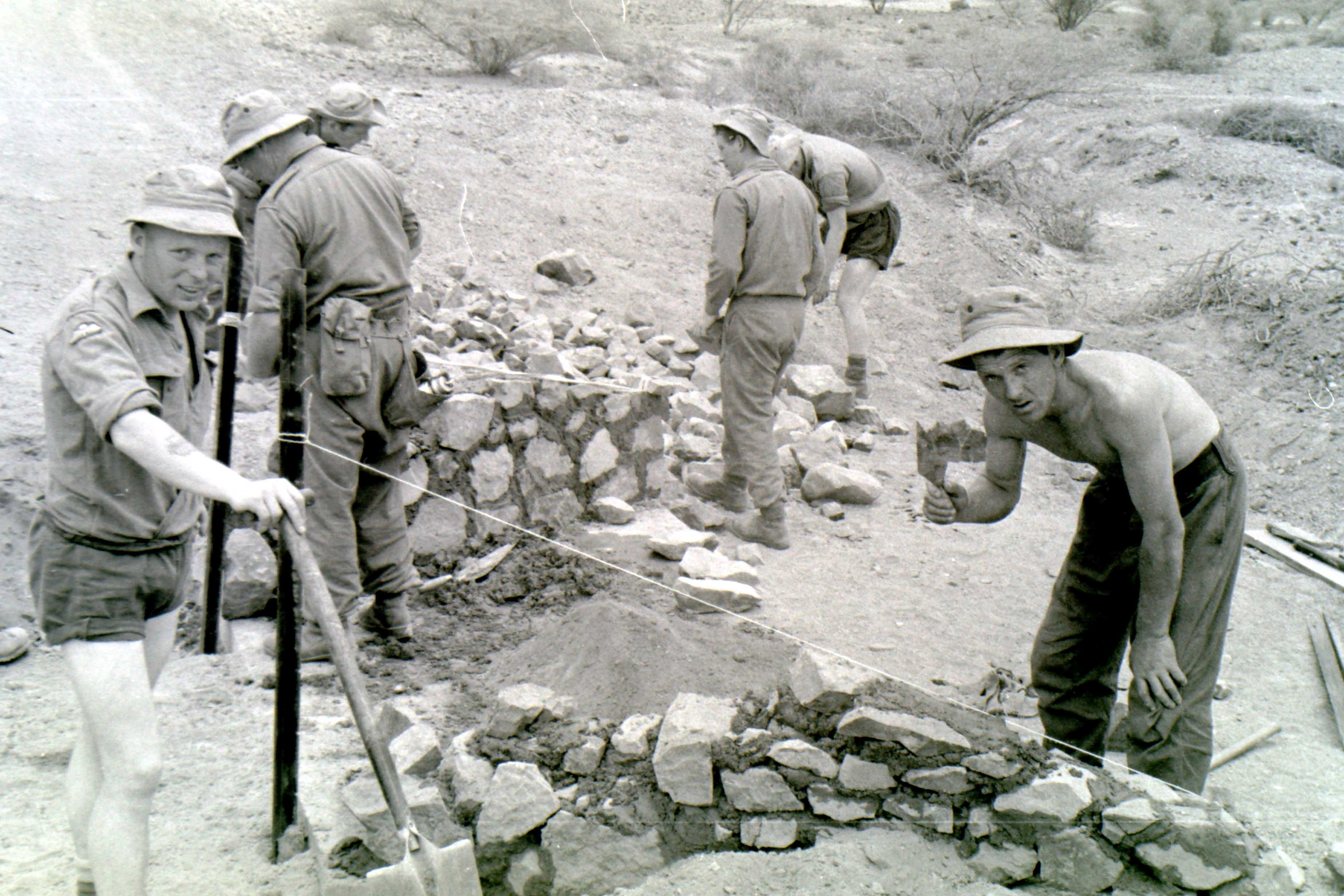
Culvert construction on the Dhala Road by Territorial Army Parachute Engineers of 131 Regiment

- 22 SAS Regiment
  - 'A' Squadron
    - 3 Troop
  - 'G' Squadron
- Royal Armoured Corps
  - 10th Royal Hussars
  - 1st The Queen's Dragoon Guards
  - 4th/7th Royal Dragoon Guards
  - Queen's Own Hussars
  - Queen's Royal Irish Hussars
  - 16th/5th The Queen's Royal Lancers
  - Royal Tank Regiment
    - D Squadron
    - 1st Royal Tank Regiment
    - 5th Royal Tank Regiment
      - B Squadron
- Guards Division
  - 1st Battalion, Coldstream Guards
  - 2nd Battalion, Coldstream Guards
  - 1st Battalion, Welsh Guards
  - 1st Battalion, Irish Guards
- Infantry
  - 1st Battalion, Royal Scots
  - 4th Battalion, The Buffs (Royal East Kent Regiment)
  - 1st Battalion, King's Own Royal Border Regiment (Various companies in support)
  - 1st Battalion The King's Own Scottish Borderers
  - 1st Battalion, Royal Irish Fusiliers
    - B Company
  - 1st Battalion, Royal Sussex Regiment
  - 1st Battalion, Royal Northumberland Fusiliers
  - Royal Anglian Regiment
    - 1st East Anglian Regiment
    - 1st Battalion, Royal Anglian Regiment
    - 3rd Battalion, Royal Anglian Regiment
    - 4th Battalion, Royal Anglian Regiment (1965)
      - C Company (1967)
  - 1st Battalion, Prince of Wales's Own Regiment of Yorkshire
  - 1st Battalion, Lancashire Regiment
  - 1st Battalion, Somerset and Cornwall Light Infantry
  - 1st Battalion, King's Own Yorkshire Light Infantry
  - 1st Battalion, Cameronians (Scottish Rifles)
  - 1st Battalion, Argyll and Sutherland Highlanders
  - 1st Battalion, Gloucestershire Regiment
  - 1st Battalion, The South Wales Borderers
- Parachute Regiment
  - 1st Battalion, Parachute Regiment
  - 2nd Battalion, Parachute Regiment
  - 3rd Battalion, Parachute Regiment
    - 'B' Company
- Royal Artillery
  - 1st Regiment Royal Horse Artillery
    - 'B' Battery
    - Chestnut Troop
  - 3rd Regiment Royal Horse Artillery
    - 'J' (Sidi Rezegh) Battery
  - 7th (Parachute) Regiment Royal Horse Artillery
  - 19th Field Regiment, Royal Artillery
  - Helicopters from 47th Light Regiment, Royal Artillery
  - 95th Commando Regiment Royal Artillery
- Royal Engineers
  - 10 Field Squadron (Airfields), Royal Engineers (Nov 1964 - 13 Dec 1967, last unit to leave)
  - 12 Field Squadron
    - 2 Troop
  - 13 Field Survey Squadron Royal Engineers (15 Jan 1964 - 29 Jun 1967)
  - 24 Field Squadron Royal Engineers (15 Oct 1964 - 12 Jul 1965)
  - 30 Field Squadron Royal Engineers (Sep 1966 - Apr 1967)
  - 34 Independent Field Squadron Royal Engineers
    - 2 Troop
  - 39 Field Squadron Royal Engineers (Apr 1967 - Oct 1967)
  - 50 Field Squadron Royal Engineers (Aug 1964 - ?)
    - A Troop (Sep 1967 - Nov 1967)
  - 60 Field Squadron Royal Engineers (Nov 1964 - Nov 1965, Mar 1967 - Oct 1967)
  - 73 Field Squadron Royal Engineers (1965 - 1966)
  - 131 Parachute Engineer Regiment (Territorial Army)
  - 24th Brigade Postal and Courier Communications Unit Royal Engineers (1964 - 1967)
- Royal Corps of Signals
  - 15 Signal Regiment, Royal Corps of Signals (1965 - 1967)
  - 222 (AF) Squadron Air Formation Signals (1959 - 1967)
- Royal Military Police
- Royal Corps of Transport
- Royal Electrical and Mechanical Engineers
- Royal Army Medical Corps
  - 10 Brigade. Group. Medical Company R.A.M.C.
  - 24 Field Ambulance
- Royal Army Ordnance Corps
- Royal Army Pay Corps
- Army Air Corps
  - 13 Flight
- Intelligence Corps
- Royal Pioneer Corps (518 Company)
- Army Catering Corps
