= List of accidents and incidents involving the Westland Sea King =

Accidents and incidents involving the Westland Sea King
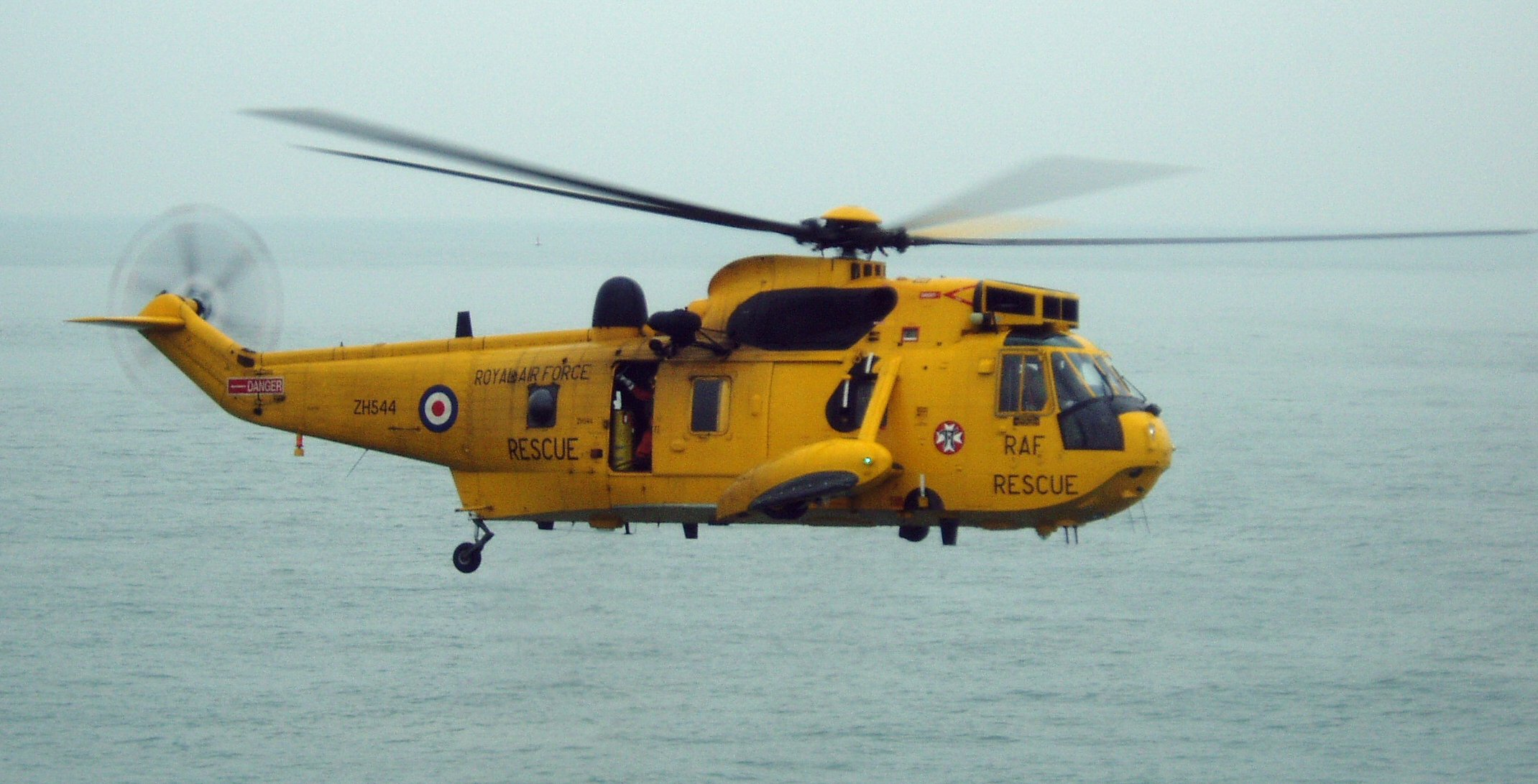
- Royal Air Force Sea King HAR3A

This is a list of accidents and incidents involving the Westland Sea King helicopter, a British license-built and developed version of the American Sikorsky Sea King anti-submarine and utility helicopter, As of 2012, Westland Sea Kings have been involved in forty-six significant accidents and incidents, involving forty-eight aircraft, during their service career. This total includes thirty accidents and incidents involving Royal Navy helicopters, one involving a helicopter operated by the Empire Test Pilot's School, two involving helicopters owned by the German Navy, three involving helicopters operated by the Royal Norwegian Air Force, four were Sea Kings owned by the Indian Navy, one owned by the Pakistan Navy, and five involving Sea Kings operated by the Royal Australian Navy. Sixty-nine pilots and crewmembers have been killed in accidents involving Westland Sea Kings.

Of the accidents and incidents included in this list, six were caused by engine failure, while six flight-into-terrain accidents were recorded, with two additional hard landings resulting in serious damage to the aircraft. Seven more of the accidents and incidents were a result of problems in the helicopters' drive systems, while five others were caused by collisions, three of them being mid-air collisions - two with other Sea Kings, the third, with a Lockheed Hercules transport -, one a collision with the superstructure of a ship, and another a collision with a high-tension cable. Two accidents were the result of failure of the main rotor, with two others being caused by weather, while one accident each was caused by instrument failure, bird strike (presumed), fuel exhaustion, and on-board fire; eleven other accidents and incidents did not mention a specific cause, simply that the helicopter involved crashed or ditched without further detail being provided.

== 1970s ==
1972

- 13 January 1972 - Royal Navy Sea King HAS1 serial number XV645 of 737 Naval Air Squadron ditched and sank 22 miles south of Portland Bill following No. 2 engine runaway during the hover, crew rescued including one injured.
- 10 April 1972 - Royal Navy Sea King HAS1 XV662 of 826 Naval Air Squadron made a water landing off 6.9 miles of The Lizard due to extreme vibrations while hovering, rolled over and sank, crew rescued and helicopter recovered.

1974

- 16 January 1974 - Sea King Mk 41 89+61, undergoing factory tests before delivery to the German Navy, suffered wind shear during a circuit of the airfield at Yeovil; the pilot overcorrected attempting to recover, and the aircraft crashed into a building. All five crewmembers survived.
- 21 March 1974 - Royal Navy Sea King HAS1 XV702 of 824 Naval Air Squadron crashed into cliff during a night exercise at Downas Valley near Coverack, four crew killed.
- 19 November 1974 - Royal Navy Sea King HAS2 XV644 of 737 Naval Air Squadron ditched and sank 21 miles south of Portland Bill after tail rotor drive failure, crew picked up and helicopter salvaged.
- 12 December 1974 - Royal Navy Sea King HAS1 XV667 of 826 Naval Air Squadron made a night water landing in the Bay of Biscay while operating from HMS Tiger following loss of 5 ft from main rotor, crew vacated aircraft which then rolled over and sank, crew rescued.

1975

- 21 October 1975 - Royal Australian Navy Sea King Mk 50 N16-117 of 817 Squadron ditched in the sea near Shoalhaven Bight; the crew was recovered safely, and the helicopter was salvaged the following month, with its wreckage currently displayed at the Australian Fleet Arm Museum.
- 17 November 1975 - Royal Navy Sea King HAS1 XV695 of 819 Naval Air Squadron was operating in the North Sea from HMS Hermes when it ditched, rolled inverted and sank following engine problems, crew rescued.

1976

- 31 March 1976 - Royal Navy Sea King HAS1 XV669 of 820 Naval Air Squadron was operating from HMS Blake when it ditched, rolled over and sank when control was lost due to severe vibration, helicopter had lost the main rotor balance weights whilst dunking, crew rescued.
- 30 November 1976 - Royal Australian Navy Sea King Mk 50 N16-113 ditched in the sea off Kiama following the failure of the aircraft's transmission. Helo remained afloat for 6 hours then sank during salvage attempt; crew rescued uninjured..

1977

- 30 April 1977 - Royal Norwegian Air Force Sea King Mk. 43 072 of 330 Squadron suffered a tail rotor strike during hovering over the sea and crashed; all four crewmembers died.
- 25 October 1977 - Royal Navy Sea King HAS1 XV646 of 814 Naval Air Squadron ditched and sank in south western approaches following tail rotor transmission failure, crew rescued, helicopter not recovered.

1978

- September? October?- Royal Navy Sea King mk2 "xv647" call sign 412 ditched in Gulf of Mexico stayed afloat with rotors still turning, sea was calm and Sea King was able to taxi afloat till HMS Blake arrived beside it. Aircraft shut down and was recovered by crane onto midships of HMS Blake

1979

- 23 May 1979 - Royal Australian Navy Sea King Mk. 50 N16-098 suffered a tail rotor failure while attempting to land aboard HMAS Melbourne, and ditched in the sea. All four crewmembers were recovered.
- 9 October 1979 - Royal Navy Sea King HAS2 "XV707" of 706 Squadron suffered a tail rotor failure on approach to landing at RNAS Culdrose and crashed. Nil injuries to the two crew ( Student and Instructor)

== 1980s ==
1980

- 14 January 1980 - Royal Navy Sea King HAS2 XZ572 of 814 Naval Air Squadron was operating from HMS Bulwark when it ditched between Bermuda and the American mainland due to severe oil leak, crew rescued.

1981

- 8 February 1981 - Indian Navy Sea King Mk. 42 IN503 was written off in an accident on this date; no details are available.
- 6 March 1981 - Royal Navy Sea King HAS5 XZ915 and XZ917 both of 820 Naval Air Squadron collided while making an approach to land on HMS Invincible, six miles south of St Catherine's Point, Isle of Wight, all four crew killed on XZ917 and one on XZ915.

1982

- 11 January 1982 - German Navy Sea King Mk 41 89+58 suffered an accident during autorotation practice at Delmenhorst. One crewmember was injured; the helicopter was rebuilt.
- 23 April 1982 - Royal Navy Sea King HC4 ZA311 of 846 Naval Air Squadron crashed and sunk in the south Atlantic returning to HMS Hermes in bad weather, pilot rescued but the one crewman was killed.
- 12 May 1982 - Royal Navy Sea King HAS5 ZA132 of 826 Naval Air Squadron ditched and sunk five miles south of HMS Hermes following engine failure, crew rescued.
- 18 May 1982 - Royal Navy Sea King HAS2 XZ573 of 826 Naval Air Squadron ditched two miles from HMS Hermes in the south Atlantic due to radio altimeter failure when it entered the hover, crew rescued and helicopter sunk by naval gunfire due to enemy proximity.
- 18 May 1982 - Royal Navy Sea King HC4 ZA290 of 846 Naval Air Squadron crashed onto the beach at Agua Fresca, Chile during covert operation to land SAS troopers, aircraft set on fire by crew which then surrendered to Chilean authorities.
- 19 May 1982 - Royal Navy Sea King HC4 ZA294 of 846 Naval Air Squadron suffered a suspected bird strike while waiting to land on Intrepid and crashed, rolled over and sank 200 miles from Port Stanley, nine rescued and 21 killed.
- 11 July 1982 - Royal Navy Sea King HAS2 XV698 of 824 Naval Air Squadron was carrying out a vertical replenishment of Leeds Castle in the south Atlantic when it ditched and sank following No. 2 engine failure, crew rescued.

1983

- 3 February 1983 - Royal Navy Sea King HAS5 XV658 of 820 Naval Air Squadron crashed into the sea off Portugal during deck landing practice on HMS Invincible, one crew member killed.
- 18 June 1983 - Indian Navy Sea King Mk. 42 IN506 was written off in an accident on this date; no details are available.

1985

- 21 June 1985 - Royal Navy Sea King HAS5 ZD635 of 819 Naval Air Squadron ran out of fuel while en route from HNLMS Poolster to RAF Leuchars with an underslung load and crashed Spear Hill near Tayport, one killed.
- 27 June 1985 - Royal Navy Sea King HAS5 XZ919 of 826 Naval Air Squadron collided with a Royal Air Force Lockheed Hercules over the Falkland Islands, four crew killed.

1986

- 17 January 1986 - Indian Navy Sea King Mk. 42 IN508 was written off in an accident on this date; no details are available.
- 8 February 1986 - Pakistan Navy Sea King Mk. 45 4513 ditched and was written off on this date; no details are available.
- 15 July 1986 - Royal Australian Navy Sea King Mk 50 N16-112 of 817 Squadron ditched in the sea near Port Kembla following the loss of transmission oil; the helicopter was written off. All members of the crew were recovered.
- 15 October 1986 - Royal Navy Sea King HAS5 ZD632 of 820 Naval Air Squadron crashed into sea and sunk while on approach to HMS Ark Royal off Gibraltar, crew rescued.
- 10 November 1986 - Royal Norwegian Air Force Sea King Mk. 43 068 flew into a high-tension cable near Bodø and crashed; one crewmember was killed.

1987

- 24 February 1987 - Royal Navy Sea King HAS5 XV668 of 706 Naval Air Squadron ditched and sank five miles south of Dodman Point near Falmouth while practising night cable hover emergencies, three crew killed.
- 23 July 1987 - Sea King Mk. 42B ZF527, under test by Westland prior to delivery to the Indian Navy as 514, ditched in the Mediterranean Sea following an engine failure during dipping sonar trials; all six crewmembers aboard were rescued.

1988

- 3 February 1988 - Royal Navy Sea King HAS5 XV652 of 826 Naval Air Squadron ditched and sank in the Mediterranean of Spain while operating from HNLMS Poolster, four crew rescued, helicopter not recovered.
- 2 April 1988 - Royal Norwegian Air Force Sea King Mk. 43 069 crashed in a white-out near Lake Tyin during a rescue mission; the helicopter was later salvaged and returned to service.
- 13 October 1988 - Royal Navy Sea King HAS5 XZ916 crashed into the sea 10 miles south of the Eddystone Lighthouse following take off from RFA Resource, two crew killed and one injured.

1989

- 27 October 1989 - Royal Navy Sea King HAS5 XZ582 '264' of 814 Naval Air Squadron was operating from HMS Invincible in the Atlantic Ocean near Bermuda when it ditched and sank following loss of main gearbox oil, crew rescued.
- 28 January 1989 Royal Air Force Sea King HAR3 XZ585 double engine failure during approach to landing site at Creag Meagaidh in the Scottish Highlands. Crashed. Minor injuries to 4 crew and passengers including 1 groundcrew, 2 film crew and four members of Lochaber MRT. XZ585 was repaired, flew many more hours and is now on display at the RAF Museum Hendon.

== 1990s ==
1990

- 25 May 1990 - Indian Navy Sea King Mk. 42A IN551 crashed on this date, killing all five crewmembers.

1991

- 1 June 1991 - Royal Navy Sea King HAS2 XZ577 of 826 Naval Air Squadron was involved in relief operations in Bangladesh when it ditched and sank close to RFA Fort Grange when the rotor blades hit the ship's rigging during low flypast, crew rescued.
- 10 Sept 1991 - Royal Navy Seaking ZD631 814 Naval Air Squadron. Main Gearbox failure during flight. Ditched and all four crew recovered. Aircraft sank and was later recovered.

1992

- 20 October 1992 - Sea King HC4X ZG829 of the Empire Test Pilot's School hit the ground and rolled over whilst still tethered, damaged beyond repair, three crew injured.

1993

- 21 September 1993 - Royal Navy Sea King HAS6 XV654 of 819 Naval Air Squadron at Prestwick Airport lost control when a tail rotor drive shaft failed in flight and hit ground but remained upright, crew OK helicopter not repaired and used for ground instructional use.
- 6 November 1993 - Royal Navy Sea King HAS5 ZE419 of 819 Naval Air Squadron hit sea and sank during a sonar hover in the Clyde training area, one crewman killed.

1998

- 4 September 1998 - Royal Navy Sea King HAS5 ZA136 of 820 Naval Air Squadron was carrying out a sonar search for a crashed SEPECAT Jaguar when it ditched and rolled due to a hydraulic leak and cabin fire, crew rescued.

1999

- 12 June 1999 - Royal Navy Sea King HAS6 ZG875 820 Naval Air Squadron spun round and was badly damaged when on the deck of the Spanish Navy ship SNS Reina Sofia during a rotors-running refuel. The auto-heading had been left on whilst refueling - when the ship altered course it attempted to correct the position of the helicopter whilst still tethered to the deck, twisting the airframe.

== 2000s ==
2003

- 22 March 2003 - Royal Navy Sea King ASaC7 XV650 and XV704 849 Naval Air Squadron collided five miles from HMS Ark Royal operating in the Persian Gulf near Kuwait, seven crew killed.

2005

- 2 April 2005 - Royal Australian Navy Sea King N16-100 of 817 Squadron crashed at Tuindrao in Indonesia during a humanitarian support mission, nine killed, two survived.
