= Ennerdale =

Ennerdale may refer to:

- Ennerdale, Cumbria, a valley in the Lake District in England
  - Ennerdale and Kinniside, a civil parish in Cumbria
  - Ennerdale Water, a lake in Ennerdale, Cumbria
  - Ennerdale Bridge, a nearby settlement
- Ennerdale, Gauteng, a suburb of Johannesburg, South Africa
- Ennerdale Link Bridges, see River Hull#Bridges
- RFA Ennerdale, the name given to a number of vessels of the Royal Fleet Auxiliary (UK)
