= RFA Ennerdale =

Two ships of the Royal Fleet Auxiliary have borne the name RFA Ennerdale:

- RFA Ennerdale (A173) was a Dale-class oiler and landing ship, gantry launched in 1941 and sold in 1960.
- RFA Ennerdale (A213) was a Dale-class mobile reserve tanker launched in 1962 as Naess Scotsman. She was acquired by HMG in 1968 and utilised to refuel Royal Naval vessels on the Beira Patrol blockading Southern Rhodesia. In June 1970, she was visiting Mahé in the Seychelles to provide her Seychellois crew with R&R. When departing to resume refueling duty along the east coast of Africa and whilst still within the sheltered water in front of Victoria Town, she was holed below the water line by an uncharted granite obstruction and sank with a full load of oil within 30 minutes. There was great concern that the oil escaping from the Wreck could cause great ecological damage but fortuitously the South East Monsoon dispersed the resultant oil slicks away from Mahé, the main island in the Seychelles group.
