= 9th Naval TBR Wing =

Royal Navy Fleet Air Arm aircraft wing

- White Ensign
- Active: 11 February 1944 – 23 October 1944
- Country: United Kingdom
- Branch: Royal Navy
- Type: Naval TBR Wing
- Role: Carrier-based Torpedo, bomber and reconnaissance
- Size: Two squadrons
- Part of: Fleet Air Arm
- Home station: RNAS Lee-on-Solent
- Engagements: World War II: European theatre of World War II; Operation Mascot; Operation Turbine

Commanders
- Notable commanders: Lieutenant Commander(A) A.J.I. Temple-West, RN; Lieutenant Commander(A) W.R. Nowell, RN

Aircraft flown
- Bomber: Fairey Barracuda Mk.II

9th Naval TBR Wing ("9 Wing") was a Fleet Air Arm torpedo bomber reconnaissance formation of the Royal Navy during the Second World War. The Wing was formed on 11 February 1944, with its headquarters at RNAS Lee-on-Solent and an attachment to HMS Indefatigable. It comprised 820 and 826 Naval Air Squadrons, both equipped with Fairey Barracuda torpedo and dive bomber aircraft. The Wing operated with the Home Fleet during the summer of 1944, including an attack on the German battleship Tirpitz in Norway, before ceasing to exist on 23 October 1944 when 820 Squadron absorbed 826 Squadron.

== History ==
=== Formation and organisation ===
From October 1943, Fleet Air Arm squadrons allocated to particular aircraft carriers were organised into Naval Wings. Nineteen such wings were formed during the Second World War, divided between fighter and torpedo bomber reconnaissance formations. The system applied to embarked squadrons and the number of squadrons assigned to each wing varied.

The 9th Naval TBR Wing was formed on 11 February 1944, with its headquarters at RNAS Lee-on-Solent, Hampshire, for the Implacable-class aircraft carrier HMS Indefatigable. It comprised 820 and 826 Naval Air Squadrons and was equipped with Fairey Barracuda, a British torpedo and dive bomber.

The wing was commanded initially by Lieutenant Commander(A) A.J.I. Temple-West, RN, who took command on 11 February 1944. Lieutenant Commander(A) W.R. Nowell, RN, succeeded him on 1 August 1944 and remained in command until the wing ceased to exist in October.

=== Embarkation and working-up ===
In June 1944, 820 and 826 Squadrons joined HMS Indefatigable, each equipped with 12 Fairey Barracuda Mk II aircraft. The aircraft carrier and her squadrons then conducted flying exercises between Belfast, Northern Ireland and the River Clyde, Scotland in preparation for operations with the Home Fleet.

=== Operation Mascot ===
A Fairey Barracuda of 820 Squadron, stands by on the flight deck of HMS Indefatigable

The wing took part in Operation Mascot, an attack on the Kriegsmarine's Bismarck-class battleship Tirpitz at her anchorage in Kåfjord, Norway, on 17 July 1944. HMS Indefatigable carried 9 Wing, comprising 820 and 826 Squadrons with a total of 24 Fairey Barracudas. The attack was intended as a repeat of the earlier Operation Tungsten attack on Tirpitz.

The German defenders had warning of the approaching aircraft and generated a smoke screen over the anchorage. The Fairey Barracudas therefore had to release their bombs without a clear view of the battleship, which was not damaged. One Fairey Barracuda of 826 Squadron, LS653, was hit by anti-aircraft fire and subsequently ditched ahead of HMS Indefatigable; its three-man crew was rescued by the destroyer HMS Scourge.

=== Operation Turbine ===
In early August 1944, the two squadrons operated together again during Operation Turbine. The operation was intended to maintain a state of alarm along the Norwegian coast and to destroy enemy shipping between Søgne and Yttercoerne. 820 and 826 Squadrons each operated 12 Fairey Barracudas whilst embarked in HMS Indefatigable.

Low cloud prevented the planned Fairey Barracuda strikes, instead they attacked two wireless stations, while a further strike was abandoned because of continuing poor weather. The carrier returned to Scapa Flow on 4 August.

=== Later operations ===
By Operation Goodwood in August 1944, 820 and 826 Squadrons were operating from separate aircraft carriers. 820 Squadron remained aboard HMS Indefatigable, while 826 Squadron operated from the Illustrious-class aircraft carrier HMS Formidable.

=== Disbandment ===
On 23 October 1944, 820 Squadron absorbed 826 Squadron, bringing the existence of the 9th Naval TBR Wing to an end.

== Squadrons ==
9th Naval TBR Wing consisted of two Fleet Air Arm torpedo bomber reconnaissance squadrons during its existence:

- 820 Naval Air Squadron, (1944)
- 826 Naval Air Squadron, (1944)

== Naval air stations and carrier deployments ==
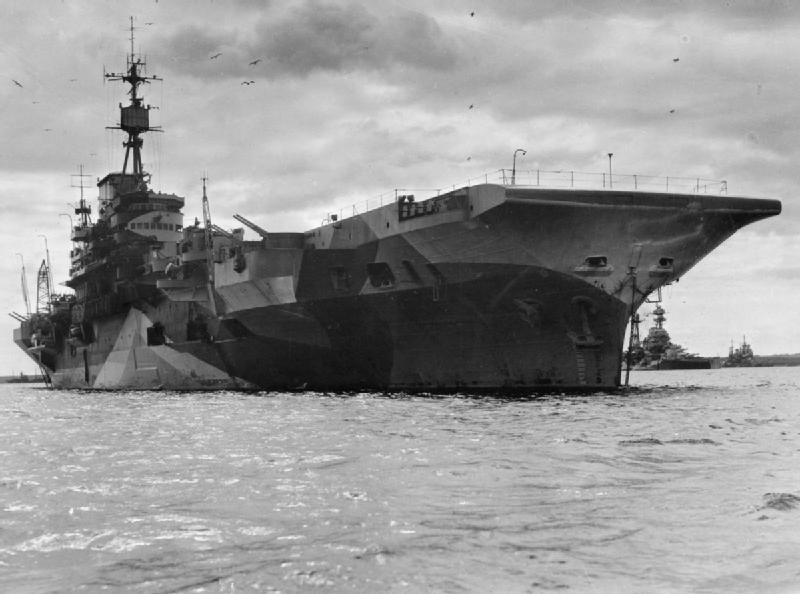
HMS Indefatigable

The Wing operated from a couple of Royal Naval Air Stations and aircraft carriers during its service with the Home Fleet.

- Royal Naval Air Station Lee-on-Solent] (HMS Daedalus), Hampshire.
  - The 9th Naval TBR Wing was formed at RNAS Lee-on-Solent on 11 February 1944, with 820 and 826 Naval Air Squadrons. Both squadrons were equipped with Fairey Barracuda and prepared for embarkation in HMS Indefatigable.
- HMS Indefatigable
  - 820 and 826 Squadrons joined the carrier on 10 June 1944, each with 12 Fairey Barracuda Mk II aircraft. The carrier conducted flying exercises between Belfast, Norther Ireland and the River Clyde , Scotland, during the subsequent working-up period before sailing for Scapa Flow and operations with the Home Fleet.
- Royal Naval Air Station Hatston (HMS Sparrowhawk), Mainland, Orkney.
  - On 5 July 1944, 820 and 826 Squadrons temporarily disembarked from HMS Indefatigable to RNAS Hatston after the carrier reached Scapa Flow. They subsequently rejoined the carrier for the Operation Mascot attack on Tirpitz later that month.
- HMS Indefatigable
  - The two squadrons formed the aircraft carrier's Fairey Barracuda striking force during Operation Mascot on 17 July 1944 and subsequently operated together during Operation Turbine in early August.
- HMS Indefatigable
  - 820 Squadron remained aboard HMS Indefatigable during Operation Goodwood in August 1944. By this stage, however, 826 Squadron had transferred to HMS Formidable, so the two squadrons no longer operated together as an intact wing.
- HMS Formidable
  - 826 Squadron operated from HMS Formidable during Operation Goodwood, while 820 Squadron operated from HMS Indefatigable. The two squadrons subsequently continued to operate separately until 820 Squadron absorbed 826 Squadron on 23 October 1944 at RNAS Machrihanish, Argyll and Bute, ending the existence of the 9th Naval TBR Wing.

== Aircraft ==
The wing's two constituent squadrons operated with one type of torpedo bomber aircraft:

- Fairey Barracuda Mk II torpedo and dive bomber (1944)

== Wing leaders ==
The wing's recorded commanding officer chronology was:

- Lieutenant Commander(A) A.J.I. Temple-West, RN, from 11 February 1944
- Lieutenant Commander(A) W.R. Nowell, RN, from 1 August 1944
- disbanded - 23 October 1944

Note: Abbreviation (A) signifies Air Branch of the RN or RNVR.

== See also ==
- Fleet Air Arm
- List of aircraft wings of the Royal Navy
- 820 Naval Air Squadron
- 826 Naval Air Squadron
- HMS Indefatigable
- HMS Formidable
- Home Fleet

== Bibliography ==
- Ballance, Theo; Howard, Lee; Sturtivant, Ray (2016). The Squadrons and Units of the Fleet Air Arm. Air Britain Historians Limited. ISBN 978-0-85130-489-2.
- Wragg, David (2019). The Fleet Air Arm Handbook 1939–1945. The History Press. ISBN 978-0-7509-9303-6.
