= RFA Derwentdale (A221) =

Dale-class tanker of the Royal Fleet Auxiliary

United Kingdom
- Name: RFA Derwentdale
- Operator: Royal Fleet Auxiliary
- Builder: Hitachi, Innoshima, Japan
- Cost: £2,290,000
- Yard number: 4009
- Launched: 8 January 1964 (as Halcyon Breeze)
- Acquired: 17 June 1967
- In service: 23 November 1967
- Out of service: June 1974
- Renamed: 23 November 1967, Derwentdale
- Identification: IMO number: 305968; Pennant number: A221
- Fate: Returned to owners Court Line (Ship Management) Ltd; Broken up in 1982

General characteristics
- Class & type: Dale-class mobile bulk tanker
- Tonnage: 42,343 GRT; 28,288 NRT; 73,375 DWT
- Displacement: 88,555 long tons
- Length: 798 ft 11 in (243.51 m)
- Beam: 117 ft 10 in (35.92 m)
- Draught: 42 ft 6 in (12.95 m)
- Depth: 55 ft 4 in (16.87 m)
- Installed power: 20,700 brake horsepower (15,400 kW)
- Propulsion: 1 x Hitachi/B&W 9-cylinder diesel; 1 x shaft
- Speed: 15.5 knots (28.7 km/h; 17.8 mph)

RFA Derwentdale (A221) was a Dale-class Mobile Bulk Tanker of the Royal Fleet Auxiliary (RFA), the naval auxiliary fleet of the United Kingdom. She was on a long-term charter from 1967 to support the Royal Navy east of Suez and was at the time the largest ship in the RFA fleet. Derwentdale had no replenishment at sea (RAS) equipment and was later classed as a Mobile Reserve Tanker.

== Construction ==
Derwentdale was built at Hitachi, Innoshima, Japan, as Halcyon Breeze for Caribbean Tankers Ltd (Court Line (Ship Management) Ltd, Managers) London. She was launched on 8 January and completed in April 1964.

The bridge, accommodation and machinery were situated aft, and she needed to undergo a refit to enable her to receive rigs from fleet tankers in RFA service, therefore she was fitted with an astern fuelling rig and an abeam reception facility. On 23 November 1967 she sailed to Tyneside for these modifications by Swan Hunter (Dry Docks) Ltd, Wallsend, was renamed Derwentdale and became the largest ever ship in the RFA.

== Operational history ==
On 17 June 1967 Halcyon Breeze was chartered by the Admiralty and two days later became the first of the Dale class to be formally accepted. The following day she arrived at Swan Hunter (Dry Docks) Ltd, Wallsend for modifications, which were completed by November. She was renamed Derwentdale and became the largest ever ship in the RFA.
