= 826 Naval Air Squadron =

Inactive flying squadron of the Royal Navy's Fleet Air Arm

- Squadron badge
- Active: Royal Navy: 1940–1943; 1943–1944; Royal Canadian Navy: 1945–1946; 1947–1951; Royal Navy: 1951–1955; 1966–1970; 1970–1993
- Disbanded: 27 July 1993
- Country: United Kingdom; Canada
- Branch: Royal Navy; Royal Canadian Navy
- Type: Torpedo Bomber Reconnaissance squadron
- Role: Carrier-based: anti-submarine warfare (ASW); anti-surface warfare (ASuW)
- Part of: Fleet Air Arm
- Mottos: Latet anguis in aqua (Latin for 'A snake lies concealed in the water')
- Battle honours: Dunkirk 1940; North Sea 1940-44; Atlantic 1940; East Indies 1941; Mediterranean 1941-43; Matapan 1941; Crete 1941; Libya 1941-42; Falkland Islands 1982; Kuwait 1991

Insignia
- Squadron Badge Description: Blue, a sea horse white armed and langued red grasping a trident point downward in base gold (1952)
- Identification Markings: L4A+, then 4A+ (Albacore); S4A+ (Albacore, later); 4A+ (Swordfish); 4A+ (Barracuda); single letters (Barracuda August 1945); 271-279 (Fairefly May 1951); 343-350 (Gannet); 340-347 (Wessex); 140-145 (Wessex October 1968); 140-147 (Sea King); 520-539 (Sea King 1983); 127-139 (Sea King) October 1985); 133-134 (Sea King OEU 1991-93)
- Fin Carrier/Shore Codes: J:A:R:FD (Firefly May 1951); J (Gannet); CU (Wessex); E (Wessex October 1968); E:TG:B:H (Sea King); BD (Sea King OEU 1991-93)

826 Naval Air Squadron (826 NAS), sometimes known as 826 Squadron, was a Fleet Air Arm (FAA) naval air squadron of the United Kingdom’s Royal Navy (RN). It most recently operated Westland Sea King anti-submarine warfare helicopter between June 1970 and July 1993.

It formed during World War II operating Fairey Albacore, Fairey Swordfish and Fairey Barracuda torpedo bombers. Post war during the late forties the squadron flew Fairey Firefly, then briefly Grumman Avenger. The squadron transitioned to Fairey Gannet in 1955. Between 1966 and 1970 it flew Westland Wessex.

== History ==
=== Second World War ===
826 Naval Air Squadron was formed at RNAS Ford (HMS Peregrine), in Sussex, as a torpedo bomber squadron equipped with twelve Fairey Albacore biplanes.

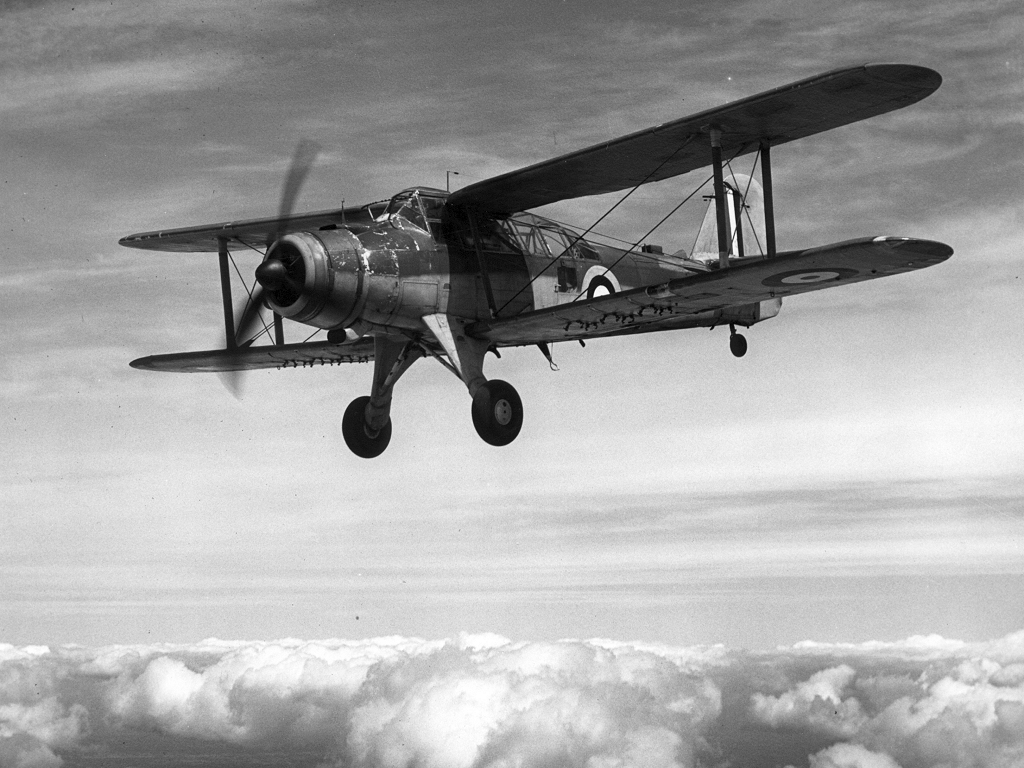
Fairey Albacore, circa 1940.

After initial training it was placed under the operational control of RAF Coastal Command, flying its first mission, a daylight bombing raid against a road junction at Nieuwpoort, Belgium on 31 May 1940. The squadron continued to fly a mixture of convoy escort missions, daylight attacks against German land and sea targets and nighttime patrols against German E-boats until the Albacore was grounded on 3 July 1940 owing to the unreliability of the aircraft's Bristol Taurus engines. This resulted in the Squadron being temporarily re-equipped with the older Fairey Swordfish until the Albacore was returned to use in August.

From August to October 1940, the Squadron carried out more convoy escort patrols and raids against barges being massed by the Germans in the Channel ports in preparation for Operation Sealion. On 7 October the squadron left Coastal Command control to undertake more training in preparation for carrier-based operations. From May to October, the Squadron dropped 55.5 tons of bombs and seven tons of mines, escorted over 100 convoys. It claimed two Messerschmitt Bf 109 fighters shot down for the loss of five Albacores.

In November 1940, the squadron embarked on the newly commissioned aircraft carrier HMS Formidable, which sailed for the Mediterranean via South Africa and the Red Sea, the squadron flying attacks against Massawa in Italian-ruled Eritrea on the way.

Peter Butterworth, famous as an actor in the British Carry On film series, was flying for the squadron when he was shot down in 1940.

The squadron's strength was supplemented by two Swordfishes in March 1941 to replace losses. 826 Squadron took part in the Battle of Cape Matapan on 28 March 1941, damaging the Vittorio Veneto. On 26 May 1941, following an attack on an airfield on Karpathos, Formidable was badly damaged by German bombers, and was withdrawn from operations for repair, with 826 Squadron being detached for land-based operations.

The Squadron was then deployed on night bombing raids over the Western Desert in support of the Eighth Army, before being transferred (along with 815 Squadron) to Nicosia, Cyprus for operations against Vichy French naval forces during the Syria–Lebanon Campaign on 28 June 1941. The squadron returned to North Africa on 15 July, and continued to carry night bombing attacks until early 1942, when it returned to the torpedo bomber role, operating from Berka in Libya to attack Italian convoys.

The Squadron continued to carry out both anti-shipping and bombing missions in support of the army for much of the rest of 1942, adding the role of dropping flares to illuminate targets for Vickers Wellington bombers, participating in both the first and second Battles of El Alamein. Following the British victory at El Alamein, the squadron continued to fly anti-shipping and convoy escort missions until disbanded on 25 August 1943.

==== Barracuda (1943-1944) ====
826 Naval Air Squadron reformed on 1 December 1943 at RNAS Lee-on-Solent equipped with the Fairey Barracuda torpedo bomber as part of No 9 Torpedo-Bomber-Reconnaissance (TBR) Wing. The Squadron deployed aboard the carrier HMS Indefatigable on 10 June, taking part in an unsuccessful raid against the Tirpitz (Operation Mascot) at Kaa Fjord in Northern Norway in July 1944, and deploying aboard HMS Formidable for another series of attacks on Tirpitz, Operation Goodwood, attacking on 24 and 29 August 1944. The Squadron was again disbanded on 13 October 1944.

=== Royal Canadian Navy ===
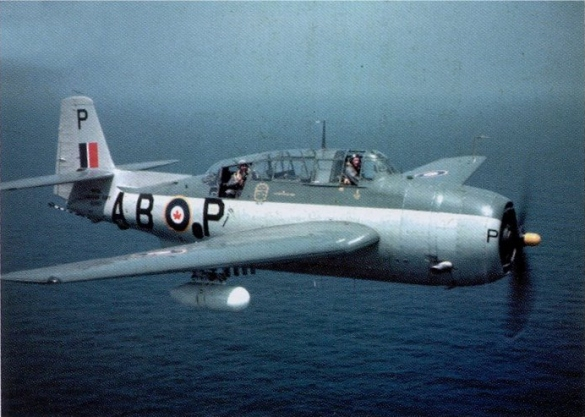
Grumman Avenger AS3

The squadron reformed on 15 August 1945, again equipped with Barracudas, at RNAS East Haven (HMS Peewit), Angus, with the intention of forming part of the air wing of HMCS Magnificent, a carrier building for the Royal Canadian Navy. It re-equipped with Fairey Firefly fighter bombers in January 1946, but was disbanded on 26 February 1946, as delays to the completion of HMCS Magnificent meant that the squadron was not yet needed.

The squadron reformed on 1 June 1947 as part of the Royal Canadian Navy, equipped with Fairey Fireflys, operating both from Magnificent and HMCS Warrior. It re-equipped with Grumman TBM Avenger anti-submarine aircraft in June 1950. On 1 May 1951, the squadron was renamed 881 Naval Air Squadron, later VS 881.

=== Return to Royal Navy ===
==== Firefly (1951-1955) ====
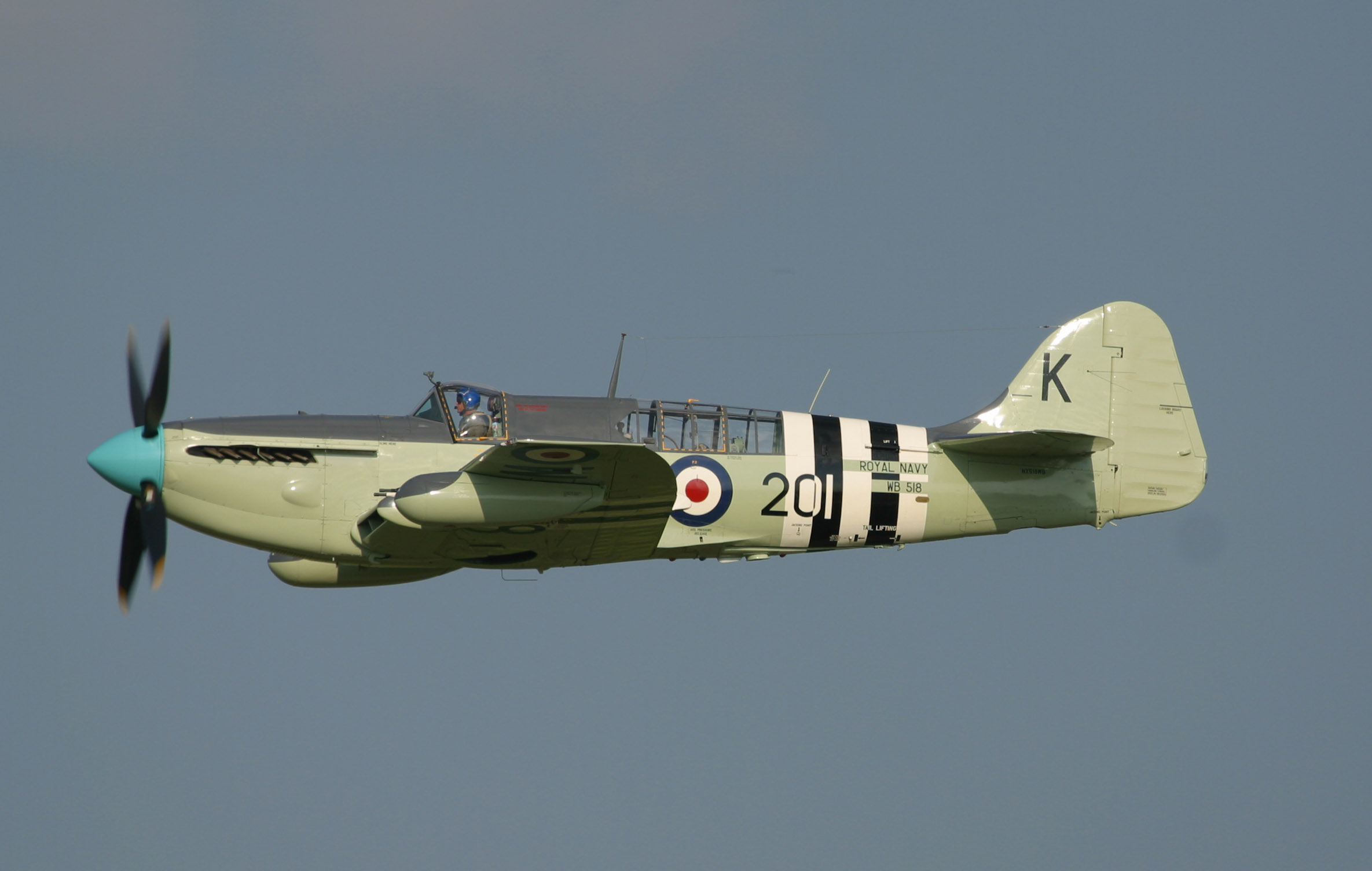
Fairey Firefly; an example of the type used by 826 Squadron

826 Squadron reformed as part of the Fleet Air Arm in May 1951, at RNAS Ford, equipped with Firefly AS.Mk 6 in the strike and anti-submarine role. The Mk.6, known as the AS.6, was purposefully engineered for anti-submarine operations and functioned as the principal anti-submarine aircraft for the Fleet Air Arm until the mid-1950s.

The squadron embarked on an autumn cruise in the Mediterranean aboard HMS Illustrious. In 1952, it transitioned to HMS Indomitable for both the spring cruise to the Mediterranean and the summer cruise off the coast of Portugal. Later that year, the squadron moved to HMS Theseus for the autumn season, before returning to HMS Indomitable in early 1953 to navigate to the Malta region amid escalating tensions in Egypt. After returning to RNAS Lee-on-Solent on 20 May to take part in the Coronation Review flypast at Spithead, the squadron had a brief period aboard HMS Illustrious before transferring to HMS Glory in November 1953 for an additional four months in the Mediterranean, ultimately returning home for new aircraft.

==== Gannet (1955) ====
In October 1953, the first production model of the Gannet AS.1 successfully completed its carrier trials. Subsequently, the inaugural operational unit, 826 Squadron, was established on 17 January 1955, at RNAS Lee-on-Solent, (HMS Daedalus), Hampshire, when the squadron re-equipped with the new Fairey Gannet anti-submarine aircraft in January 1955, becoming the first squadron to operate the Gannet. It embarked aboard HMS Eagle but disbanded in November 1955.

==== Wessex (1966-1970) ====
The 826 designation was then reactivated in 1966 at RNAS Culdrose, where the squadron was equipped with 8 Westland Wessex HAS.1 helicopters, and was attached to HMS Hermes on a tour of the Mediterranean and Far East in 1966–1967. It then deployed detachments aboard the Replenishment oilers RFA Olmeda and RFA Olna before deploying aboard HMS Eagle in 1969. The squadron disbanded at RNAS Culdrose on 25 March 1970.

==== Sea King (1970-1993) ====
It was reformed a sixth time on 2 June 1970 with Westland Sea Kings, serving on HMS Eagle until the carrier decommissioned in January 1972. The squadron then operated from the helicopter training ship RFA Engadine and from December 1972, from the cruiser HMS Tiger. It continued to operate its Sea Kings from Tiger until 1978, when it transferred to the carrier Bulwark, receiving Sea King HAS.5s in March 1981, and embarking on Hermes in September that year. (Bulwark having been paid off in March 1981.)

Following the Argentinian invasion of the Falkland Islands in April 1982, the squadron, equipped with nine Sea King HAS.5s, deployed aboard Hermes as part of the Operation Corporate Task Force sent to retake the Islands. The squadron carried anti-submarine and surface search patrols around the task force, unsuccessfully attacking a suspected Argentine submarine on the night of 1/2 May, and also rescued survivors from HMS Sheffield, HMS Coventry and Atlantic Conveyor. Four Sea Kings were transferred to the stores ship RFA Fort Austin to free up space aboard Hermes on 17 May. The Squadron lost two helicopters during the Falklands War, but on both occasions the crews escaped unharmed.

After the end of the war, the Squadron was split into a number of independent flights operating from Royal Fleet Auxiliary ships, and deployed in turn to the South Atlantic, these operations continuing until 1986. After that period, the Squadron was split into 4 flights of two Sea Kings each, operating from Type 22 frigates, RFAs and aircraft carriers as required.

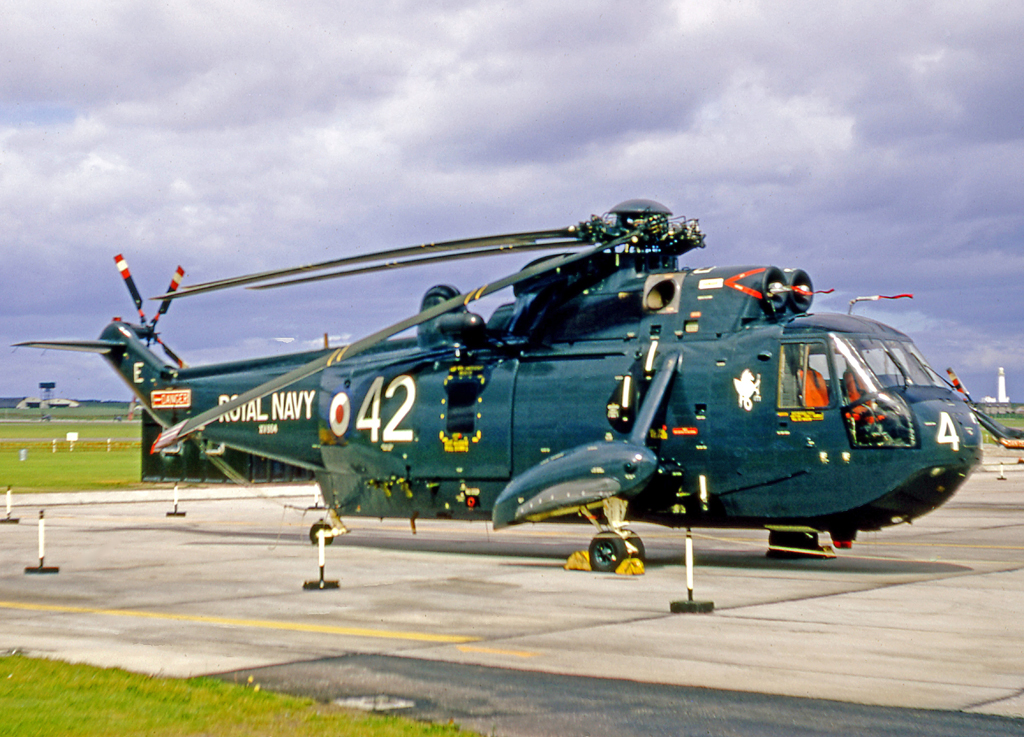
Westland Sea King HAS.1 XV664 E-142 826 Squadron

In December 1990, just prior to the start of the First Gulf War, 826 C Flight, commanded by Lt Cdr Kevin Williamson RN, deployed to the Middle East to take over the two D Flight Sea King helicopters already on station in the region - they were the only helicopters and crews deployed into the Gulf from RNAS Culdrose. The ASW equipment (SONAR and LAPADS equipment) normally fitted had been removed and prototype equipment designed to detect shallow moored mines was fitted instead. This equipment, called 'Demon Camera', was largely ineffective in the waters of the Gulf and the crews reverted to spotting moored and floating mines visually from heights of around 500 feet. The mines were then destroyed by RN EOD divers deployed directly from the helicopters in a low hover and recovered by winch. During their time deployed in the Gulf C Flight operated from HNLMS Zuiderkruis and RFAs Fort Grange, Argus and Sir Galahad. The C Flight crews returned to RNAS Culdrose in April 1991, after handing their Sea Kings back to 826 D flight personnel who then subsequently took part in flood relief operations off Bangladesh. During this period Sea King XZ577 (side number '138') was lost in a collision with RFA Fort Grange; the crew and passengers survived.

After the squadron's aircraft had been reallocated to 810 Naval Air Squadron and 819 Naval Air Squadron the squadron was again disbanded in July 1993.

== Aircraft operated ==
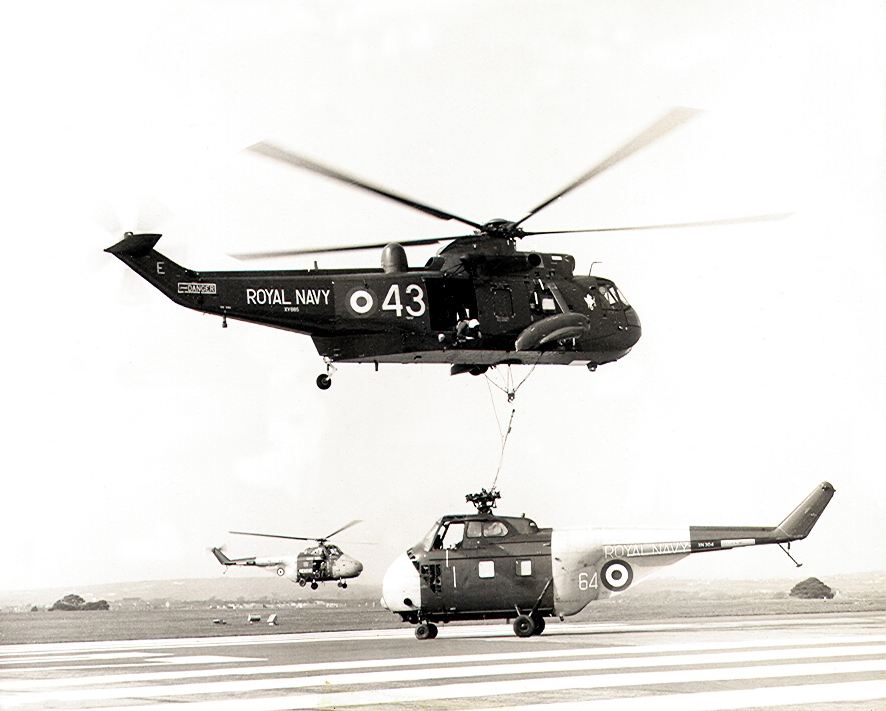
Westland Sea King HAS.1 helicopter

The squadron has operated a number of different aircraft types when under the command of the Royal Navy and the Royal Canadian Navy:

=== Royal Navy ===
- Fairey Albacore (March 1940 - August 1943)
- Fairey Swordfish I (July - August 1940, March - September 1941)
- Fairey Barracuda Mk.II (December 1943 - October 1944)
- Fairey Firefly AS Mk.6 (May 1951 - January 1955)
- Fairey Gannet AS.1 (January 1955 - November 1955)
- Westland Wessex HAS.1 March 1966 - October 1968)
- Westland Wessex HAS.3 (October 1968 - March 1970)
- Westland Sea King HAS.1 (June 1970 - December 1976)
- Westland Sea King HAS.2 (December 1976 - March 1981)
- Westland Sea King HAS.5 (March 1981 - May 1993)
- Westland Sea King HAS.6 (April 1988 - July 1993)

=== Royal Canadian Navy ===
- Fairey Barracuda Mk.II(ASH) (August 1945 - January 1946) fitted with Air-to-Surface H radar
- Fairey Firefly FR.1 (January - February 1946, May 1947 - October 1950)
- Fairey Firefly T.1 (December 1948 - January 1949)
- Grumman Avenger AS3 (October 1950 - May 1951)

== Battle honours ==
The ten Battle Honours awarded to 826 Naval Air Squadron are:

- Dunkirk 1940
- North Sea 1940-44
- Atlantic 1940
- East Indies 1941
- Mediterranean 1941-43
- Matapan 1941
- Crete 1941
- Libya 1941-42
- Falkland Islands 1982
- Kuwait 1991

== Assignments ==
826 Naval Air Squadron was assigned as needed to form part of a number of larger units:

- 9th Naval TBR Wing (11 February 1944 - 23 October 1944)

== Commanding officers ==
List of commanding officers of 826 Naval Air Squadron:

=== Royal Navy ===
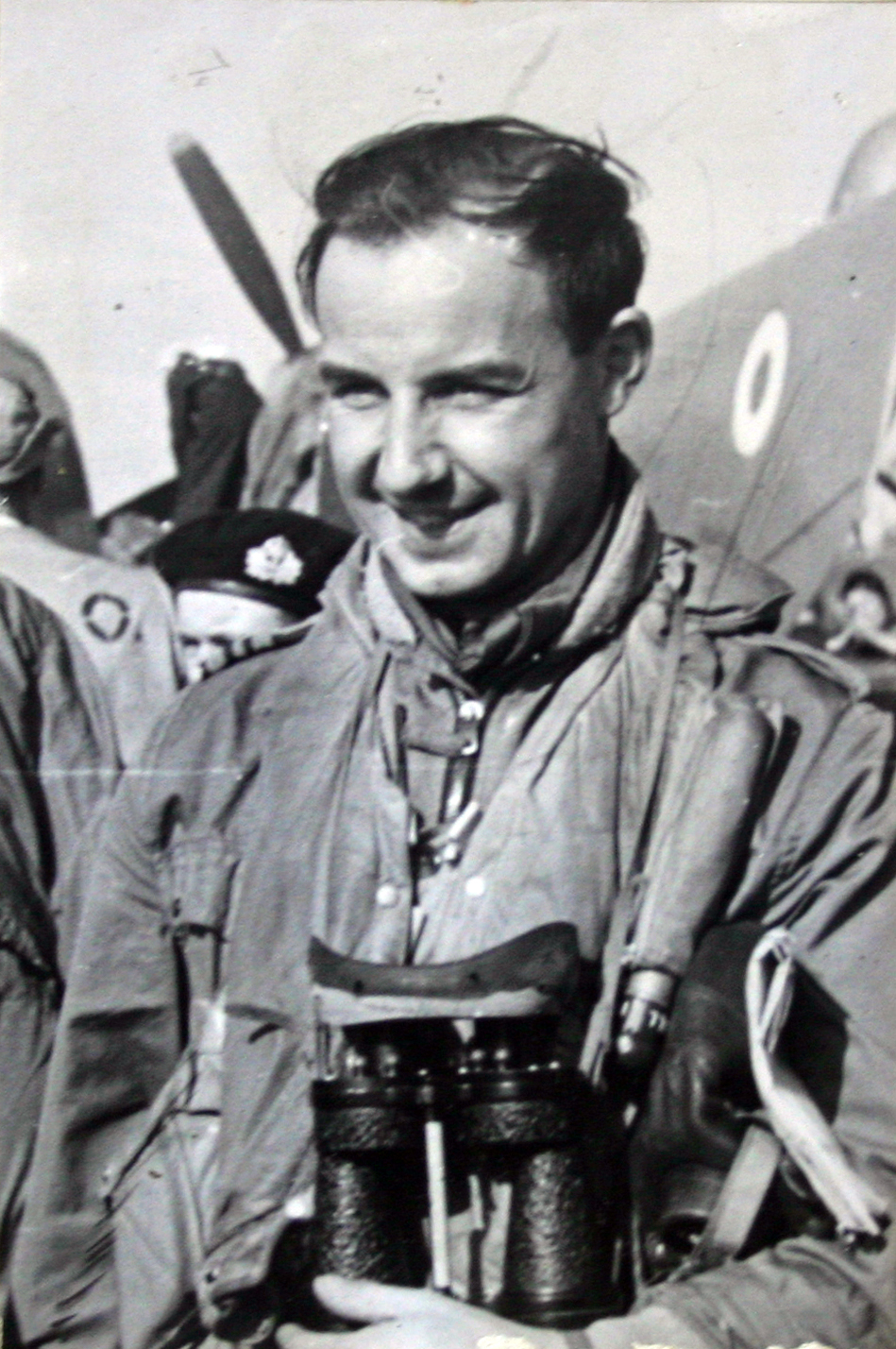
Commander Jeffrey Powell, Commanding Officer of 826 Naval Air Squadron 1954, aboard HMS Glory

1940 - 1943

- Lieutenant F.H.E. Hopkins, RN, from 15 March 1940
- Lieutenant Commander C.J.T. Stephens, RN, from 7 April 1940
- Lieutenant Commander W.H.G. Saunt, DSC, RN, from 27 May 1940
- Lieutenant Commander J.W.S. Corbett, RN, from 24 June 1941 ( (POW) 24 January 1942, drowned escaping 21 March 1943)
- Lieutenant C.W.B. Smith, DFC, RN, from 25 January 1942
- Lieutenant P.W. Compton, RN, from 5 March 1942
- Lieutenant V.G.H. Ramsey-Fairfax, RN, from 24 August 1942
- Lieutenant Commander(A) R.E. Bradshaw, DSC, RN, from 1 May 1943
- disbanded - 25 August 1943

1943 - 1944

- Lieutenant Commander(A) A.J.I. Temple-West, RN, from 1 December 1943
- Lieutenant Commander(A) S.P. Luke, RN, from 26 January 1944
- disbanded - 23 October 1944

1951 - 1955

- Lieutenant Commander P.C. Heath, RN, from 15 May 1951
- Lieutenant Commander J.W. Powell, DSC, RN, from 4 December 1952
- Lieutenant Commander R. Fulton, RN, from 10 September 1954
- Lieutenant Commander G.F. Birch, RN, from 17 January 1955
- disbanded - 22 November 1955

1966 - 1970

- Lieutenant Commander R.A. Duxbury, RN, from 18 March 1966
- Lieutenant Commander J.G. Kemp, RN, from 3 October 1967
- Lieutenant Commander N. Unsworth, RN, from 3 November 1969
- disbanded - 25 March 1970

1970 - 1993

- Lieutenant Commander N. Unsworth, RN, from 2 June 1970
- Lieutenant Commander R.E. Van der Plank, RN, from 15 April 1971
- Lieutenant Commander K.F. Harding, RN, from 1 September 1972
- Lieutenant Commander J.M. Neville-Rolfe, RN, from 7 May 1974
- Lieutenant Commander M.J. Lehan, RN, from 4 July 1975
- Lieutenant Commander C.J.S. Craig, RN, from 1 December 1975
- Lieutenant Commander G.N.I. Harvey, RN, from 1 April 1976
- Lieutenant Commander A.W. English, RN, from 10 October 1977
- Lieutenant Commander T.P.H. Richardson, RN, from 29 May 1979
- Lieutenant Commander D.J.S. Squier, AFC, RN, from 1 December 1980
- Lieutenant Commander D.A. Raines, RN, from 3 September 1982
- Lieutenant Commander A.J.M. Hogg, AFC, RN, from 16 December 1983
- Lieutenant Commander K. Dudley, RN, from 5 June 1984 (Commander 31 December 1985)
- Lieutenant Commander J.R. Skinner, RN, from 28 January 1986
- Lieutenant Commander P.A. Shaw, MVO, RN, from 16 February 1988 (Commander 1 October 1989)
- Lieutenant Commander M.W. Butcher, RN, from 13 June 1990
- Lieutenant Commander A.K. Grant, RN, from 23 August 1991 (Commander 30 June 1993)
- disbanded - 27 July 1993

Note: Abbreviation (A) signifies Air Branch of the RN or RNVR.

==== 826A Flight ====
- Lieutenant Commander M.J. Kay, RN, from 25 May 1983
- Lieutenant Commander I.C. Domoney, RN, from 19 December 1984
- Lieutenant D.R. James, RN, from 1 October 1985 (Lieutenant Commander 16 January 1986)
- Lieutenant Commander T.R. Forrester, RN, from 6 January 1987
- Lieutenant Commander M.M.D. Mason, RN, from 18 October 1988, until 8 January 1990

==== 826B Flight ====
- Lieutenant Commander R.C. Green, RN, from 1 February 1983
- Lieutenant Commander N.J. Cowley, RN, from 27 May 1983
- Lieutenant Commander R. Lamb, RN, from 18 June 1984
- Lieutenant Commander D.H. Durston, RN, from 4 April 1985
- Lieutenant Commander A.S. Brooks, RN, from 18 September 1985
- Lieutenant Commander P.S. Ross, RN, from 27 February 1987
- Lieutenant Commander D. Searle, RN, from 10 November 1988, until 22 February 1991

=== Royal Canadian Navy ===
1945 - 1946

- Lieutenant Commander E.S. Carver, DSC, RN, from 15 August 1945
- Lieutenant-commander C.G. Watson, RCN(R), from 20 February 1946
- disbanded - 28 February 1946

1947 - 1951

- Lieutenant-commander J.B. Fotheringham, RCN, from 15 May 1947
- Lieutenant-commander R.I.W. Goddard, DSC, RCN, from January 1948
- Lieutenant-commander J.W. Roberts, RCN, from 10 October 1948
- Lieutenant-commander J.N. Donaldson, RCN, from 20 April 1950
- became 881 Squadron RCN - 1 May 1951

== See also ==
- Falklands War order of battle: British naval forces
- British Order of Battle at the Aden Emergency
- Frank Hopkins (Royal Navy officer) - former Royal Navy Admiral who flew with 826 Squadron during World War II
