= RFA Ennerdale (A213) =

Dale-class tanker of the Royal Fleet Auxiliary

United Kingdom
- Name: RFA Ennerdale
- Operator: Royal Fleet Auxiliary
- Builder: Kieler Howaldtswerke AG, Kiel
- Yard number: 1132
- Launched: 30 August 1963 (as Naess Scotsman)
- Acquired: July 1967
- In service: February 1968
- Out of service: June 1970
- Identification: IMO number: 305869; Pennant number: A213
- Fate: Wrecked and sunk 1 June 1970

General characteristics
- Class & type: Dale-class mobile bulk tanker
- Tonnage: 29,189 GRT; 18,066 NRT; 49,209 DWT
- Displacement: 62,000 long tons
- Length: 710 ft 0 in (216.41 m)
- Beam: 98 ft 7 in (30.05 m)
- Draught: 37 ft 6 in (11.43 m)
- Depth: 51 ft 10 in (15.80 m)
- Installed power: 16,800 brake horsepower (12,500 kW)
- Propulsion: 1 x Krupp/B&W 8-cylinder diesel; 1 x shaft
- Speed: 15.5 knots (28.7 km/h; 17.8 mph)
- Complement: 51

RFA Ennerdale (A213) was a Dale-class Mobile Bulk Tanker of the Royal Fleet Auxiliary (RFA), the naval auxiliary fleet of the United Kingdom. She was on a long-term charter from 1967 to support the Royal Navy east of Suez. Ennerdale had no replenishment at sea (RAS) equipment and was later classed as a Mobile Reserve Tanker.

== Construction ==
Ennerdale was built at Kieler Howaldtswerke AG, Kiel, Germany, as Naess Scotsman for the Anglo-Norness Shipping Co Ltd, which was managed by Naess, Denholm & Co Ltd, London. She was launched on 31 August and completed later in 1963.

The bridge, accommodation and machinery were situated aft, and she needed to undergo a refit to enable her to receive rigs from fleet tankers in RFA service, therefore she was fitted with an astern fuelling rig and an abeam reception facility. In October 1967 she arrived on Tyneside for the modifications by Vickers Ltd Shipbuilding Group, Hebburn, and was renamed Ennerdale.
