= RFA Dewdale (A129) =

Dale-class tanker of the Royal Fleet Auxiliary

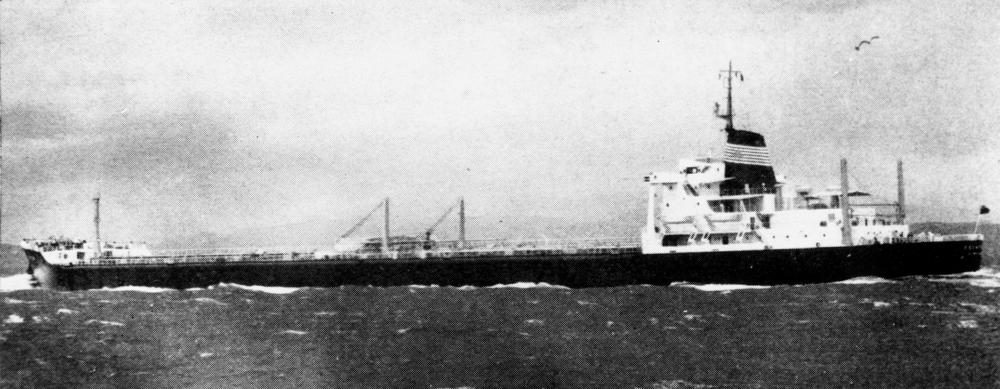
- MV Edenfield

History

United Kingdom
- Name: MV Edenfield
- Owner: Hunting (Eden) Tankers Ltd
- Builder: Harland & Wolff, Belfast
- Yard number: 1659
- Launched: 5 March 1965
- Completed: 2 July 1965
- In service: 1965, 1977
- Out of service: 1967, 1978

United Kingdom
- Name: RFA Dewdale
- Operator: Royal Fleet Auxiliary
- Acquired: 13 July 1967
- In service: 14 August 1967
- Out of service: September 1977
- Identification: IMO number: 305439; Pennant number: A129
- Fate: Returned to owners subsidiary Field Tank Steamship Co Ltd; Broken up 6 August 1982

General characteristics
- Class & type: Dale-class Mobile Bulk Tanker
- Tonnage: 35,642 GRT; 24,504 NRT; 63,588 DWT
- Displacement: 67,000 long tons
- Length: 747 ft 0 in (227.69 m) PP; 774 ft 6 in (236.07 m) LOA
- Beam: 107 ft 10 in (32.87 m)
- Draught: 41 ft 5 in (12.62 m)
- Depth: 55 ft 0 in (16.76 m)
- Installed power: 17,000 brake horsepower (13,000 kW)
- Propulsion: 1 x H&W/B&W 9-cylinder diesel engine; 1 x shaft
- Speed: 15 knots (28 km/h; 17 mph)
- Complement: 51

RFA Dewdale (A129) was a Dale-class Mobile Bulk Tanker of the Royal Fleet Auxiliary (RFA), the naval auxiliary fleet of the United Kingdom. She was on a long-term charter from 1967 to support the Royal Navy east of Suez and was at the time one of the largest ships in the RFA fleet. Dewdale had no replenishment at sea (RAS) equipment and was classed as a Mobile Reserve Tanker.

== Construction ==
Dewdale was built at Harland & Wolff, Belfast, as Edenfield for Hunting (Eden) Tankers Ltd, managed by Hunting & Son Ltd, Newcastle upon Tyne. She was launched on 5 March and completed on 2 July 1965.

The bridge, accommodation and machinery were situated aft, and she needed to undergo a refit to enable her to receive rigs from fleet tankers in RFA service, therefore she was fitted with an astern fuelling rig and an abeam reception facility. On 14 August 1967 she was bareboat chartered by the Admiralty and sailed to Birkenhead for these modifications, which were completed by Cammell Laird & Co.
