= 820 Naval Air Squadron =

Flying squadron of the Royal Navy's Fleet Air Arm

- Squadron badge
- Active: Royal Air Force; 1933–1939; Royal Navy: 1939–1943; 1944–1946; 1951–1956; 1956-1957; 1958–1959; 1959–1960; 1964-2003; 2003-present
- Country: United Kingdom
- Branch: Royal Navy
- Type: Torpedo Bomber Reconnaissance squadron
- Role: Carrier-based: anti-submarine warfare (ASW); anti-surface warfare (ASuW); Airborne Surveillance and Control (ASaC)
- Part of: Fleet Air Arm
- Home station: RNAS Culdrose
- Mottos: Tutamen et ultor (Latin for 'Safeguard and avenger')
- Aircraft: AgustaWestland Merlin HM2
- Engagements: World War II; Aden Emergency; Falklands War; War against the Islamic State
- Battle honours: See Battle honours section for full list.
- Website: Official website

Commanders
- Current commander: Commander Al ‘Conchita’ Woodward, RN

Insignia
- Squadron Badge Description: White, two bars wavy blue in base a flying fish also blue (1937)
- Identification Markings: 738-750 (IIIF/Seal/Shark); 645-659 (Shark from December 1935); 40-46 (Baffin); 645-659 (Swordfish); A4A+ (Swordfish May 1939); A4+ (Swordfish later); 5A+ also 0A+ (Albacore); 3A+ (Barracuda); I8A+ (Barracuda October 1944); 1A+ (Avenger); 370-389 (Avenger later); 236-243 (Firefly); 221-229 (Firefly December 1951); 371-378 (Avenger March 1954); 401-409 (Gannet); 320-328 (Gannet January 1956); 320-327 (Whirlwind); 290-295 (Whirlwind October 1959); 290-297 (Wessex HAS.1); 060-067 (Wessex HAS.1 July 1956); 410-414 (Wessex HAS.3); 410-413 (Sea King); 360-362 (Sea King November 1980); 010-020 (Sea King February 1981); 010-016 (Merlin October 2003)
- Fin Carrier/Shore Codes: S (Avenger); J:T (Firefly December 1951); GN:C (Avenger March 1954); C (Gannet); C:B (Gannet January 1956); GN:A (Whirlwind January 1958); R (Whirlwind October 1959); E (Wessex HAS.1); BL (Wessex HAS.3); BL (Sea King); N (Sea King November 1980); N:R:L (Sea King February 1981)

820 Naval Air Squadron (820 NAS), also referred to as 820 Squadron, is a carrier-based Fleet Air Arm (FAA) naval air squadron of the United Kingdom’s Royal Navy (RN). It currently operates the Merlin HM2 in two capacities, either for anti-submarine warfare or for airborne surveillance, and control, to protect the UK Carrier Strike Group, with a shore base at RNAS Culdrose.

Originally part of the Royal Air Force (RAF), the squadron was active on two separate occasions from 1933 to 1946, particularly during the Second World War. From 1933 to 1937, the squadron operated Fairey III, Fairey Seal, Blackburn Baffin, and Blackburn Shark within the RAF. By the time it transferred to the Royal Navy in 1939, it was utilising Fairey Swordfish, subsequently re-equipping with Fairey Albacore, and later with Fairey Barracuda and Grumman Avenger. After the war, it operated with Fairey Firefly, had another engagement with Grumman Avenger, and then with Fairey Gannet. In the late 1950s, it transitioned to helicopters, flying the Westland Whirlwind. It was reformed in 1964 with the Westland Wessex and in 1972 made the transition to the Westland Sea King. In 2003, it transitioned to the AgustaWestland Merlin.

== History ==
=== Interwar period (1933-1939) ===
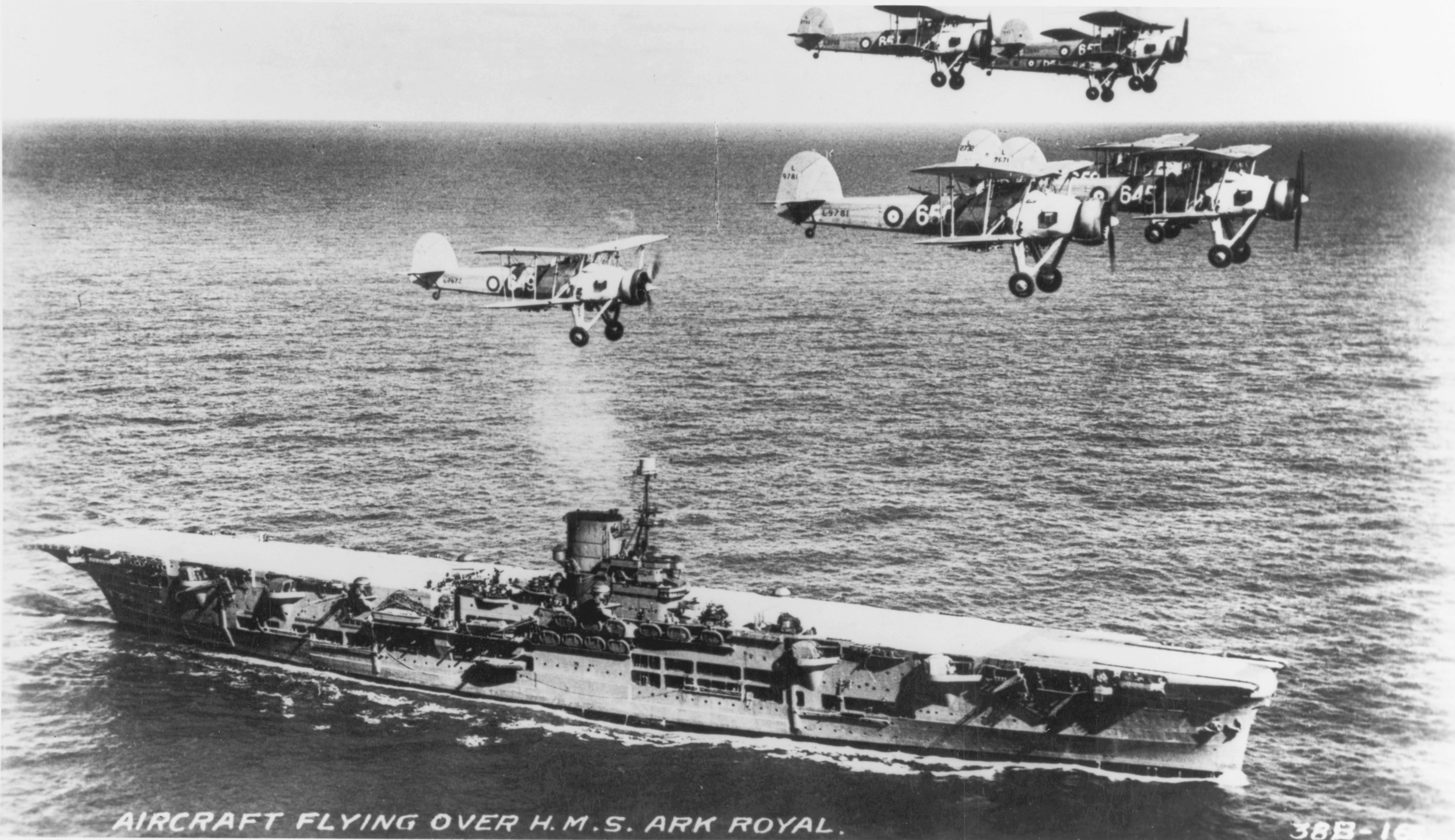
Fairey Swordfish of 820 Naval Air Squadron passing over HMS Ark Royal in 1939.

820 Squadron was formed on 3 April 1933 at RAF Gosport, Hampshire, by the merger of two independent Royal Air Force naval units, 450 and half of 445 (Fleet Spotter Reconnaissance) Flights, where it initially operated with Fairey III aircraft. The squadron's first assignment on its formation was to carry out spotter-reconnaissance duties for the aircraft carrier HMS Courageous. They were later re-equipped with Fairey Seals and Blackburn Sharks, eventually receiving Fairey Swordfish in autumn 1937.

The squadron was reassigned in November the following year to the new aircraft carrier HMS Ark Royal. The squadron operated from Ark Royal for the next three years, initially on anti-submarine duties, but later as surface search and torpedo-attack aircraft and like all of the Royal Air Force's Fleet Air Arm squadrons, it was taken over by the Admiralty on 24 May 1939.

=== Second World War (1939-1945) ===
==== Ark Royal ====
The squadron went with Ark Royal to the Atlantic, and by April 1940 they were supporting Allied operations during the Norwegian campaign, where they bombed Vaernes airfield. After the withdrawal from Norway, Ark Royal and the squadron moved to the Mediterranean in June. Aircraft from 820 squadron were involved in attacking the French fleet at Mers-el-Kébir, and later the Battle of Dakar, as well as attacks at Cagliari. They were also active during the Battle of Cape Spartivento, as well as covering convoys to Malta.

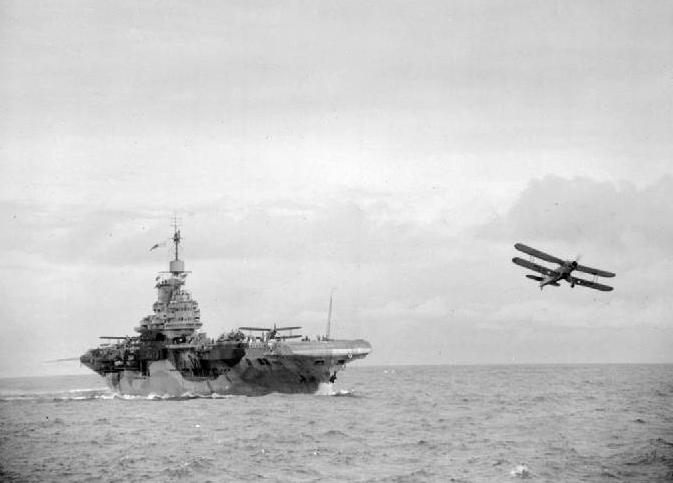
29 May 1942, a Fairey Albacore of No 820 Squadron Fleet Air Arm flies off HMS Formidable in the Indian Ocean. Two more can be seen on deck (photographed from HMS Warspite).

820 Squadron's next major engagement was the hunt for the German battleship Bismarck. Aircraft from the squadron were able to disable Bismarck's steering gear with a torpedo hit, allowing Bismarck to be engaged and sunk.

==== Mediterranean and Indian Ocean ====
In June 1941 the squadron left Ark Royal, and in November that year returned to Iceland aboard HMS Victorious. The Swordfish were then replaced with Fairey Albacores. 820 Squadron then embarked aboard HMS Formidable in February 1942, and sailed with Formidable to serve in the Indian Ocean. The squadron was then active in the Battle of Madagascar, followed by Operation Torch, the Allied landings in North Africa. During these operations, aircraft from the squadron sank U-331, which had earlier sunk the battleship HMS Barham. Formidable and the squadron remained in the Mediterranean to provide support for the Allied landings at Sicily and Salerno. The squadron then returned to the UK in November 1943 and disbanded at RNAS Donibristle.

==== Tirpitz ====
The squadron was quickly reformed however, and equipped with 12 Fairey Barracudas was initially based at RNAS Lee-on-Solent as a torpedo bomber/reconnaissance squadron. They were assigned to HMS Indefatigable in June 1944 and saw action as part of Operation Mascot on 17 July and Operations Goodwood in August, the attempts to sink the Tirpitz in the Kåjorden in Alta Municipality in Norway. The operations failed to cause significant damage to Tirpitz.

==== Far East ====
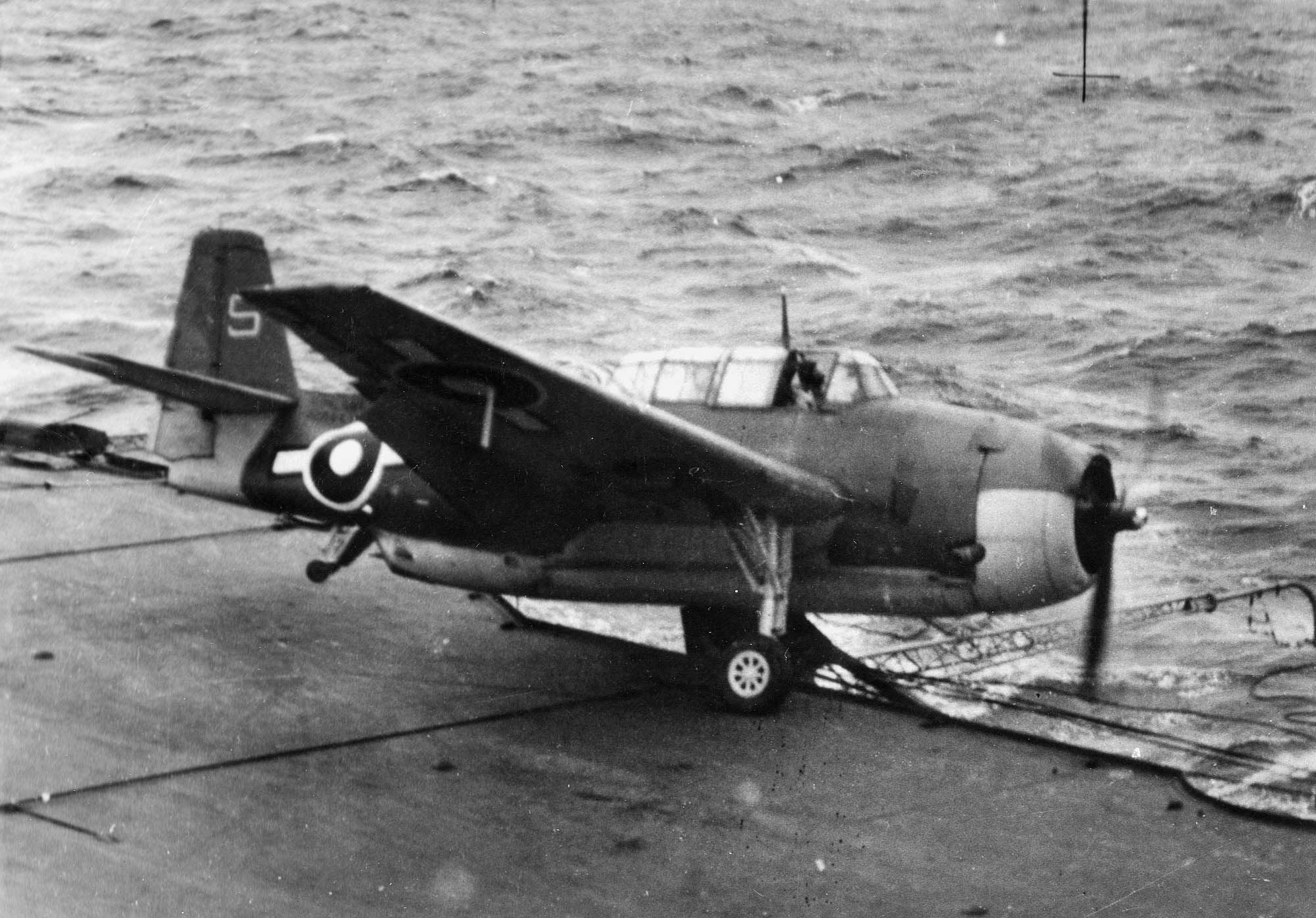
An 820 NAS Avenger Mk.II going over the side of HMS Indefatigable during the Sakishima campaign, 1945.

In September 1944, the squadron disembarked to re-equip with twenty-one Grumman Avenger Mk.I, which were soon replaced by Grumman Avenger MK.II, before re-embarking on Indefatigable on 21 November for transit to Ceylon. The Avengers provided to the FAA were supplied through Lend-Lease agreements, commencing in 1943. Up until January 1944, the British designation Tarpon was utilised; following this period, the original American name was reinstated as part of a collaborative effort among Allies to standardise designations. The Tarpon I (later known as Avenger I) served as the British counterpart to the US Navy TBF-1. Avenger II was the equivalent to the TBM-1.

As a component of the 2nd Naval Strike Wing, which also consisted of 849 Squadron, the squadron participated in a series of successful raids during the first half of 1945, targeting the oil refineries at Palembang on Sumatra, as part of Operation Meridian, followed by operations against the airfields of the Sakashima Gunto islands from March to May 1945.

After joining the 7th Carrier Air Group in June 1945, the squadron conducted attacks on targets within the Japanese home islands, including numerous locations in the Tokyo area, continuing its operations until Victory over Japan Day. The squadron was disbanded in March 1946.

=== 1950s ===
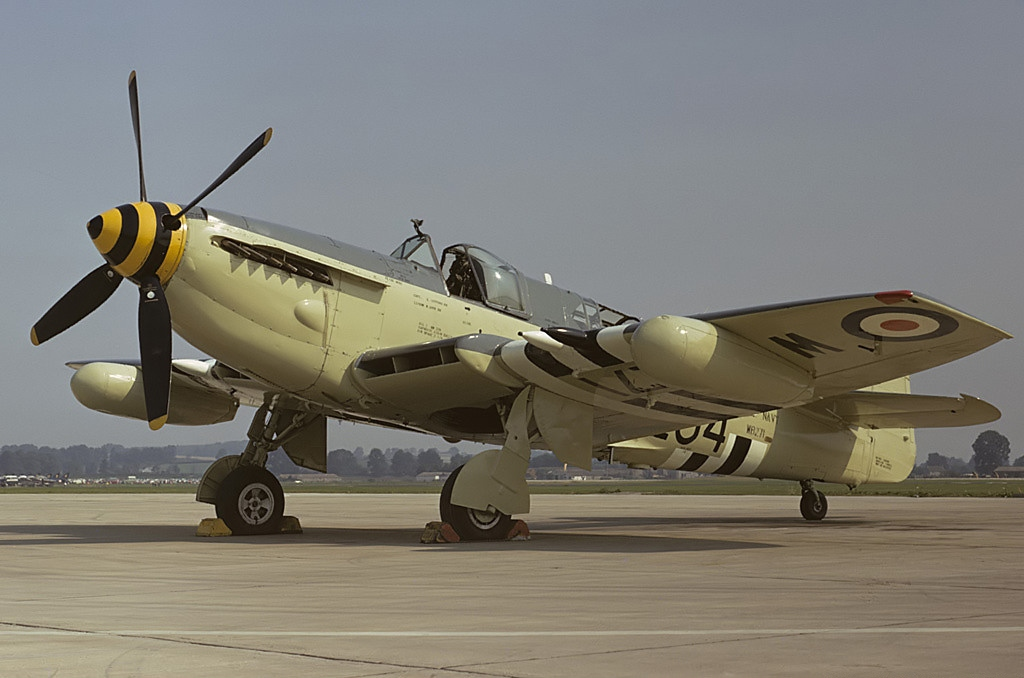
Fairey Firefly AS.5; an example of the type used by 820 Squadron

820 Squadron was reformed at RNAS Eglinton (HMS Gannet), County Londonderry, in July 1951 as an anti-submarine unit, equipped with eight Firefly AS.5s. The Fairey Firefly Mk. 5 became the most widely produced variant among the later Firefly models and signified the onset of the Firefly's modification for diverse specialised functions, with the creation of subvariants such as the FR.5, developed for fighter-reconnaissance, the NF.5, for night-fighting, and the AS.5, which was customised for anti-submarine patrol, although the distinctions among these were primarily internal.

The Mk.6, designated AS.6, was specifically designed for anti-submarine warfare and served as the primary anti-submarine aircraft for the Fleet Air Arm until the mid-1950s. In December, these replaced 820 Squadrons AS.5s, and the squadron embarked on the Illustrious-class aircraft carrier HMS Indomitable in January 1952 for a Mediterranean cruise, which was followed by an exercise. In August, the squadron transferred to the Colossus-class light fleet carrier HMS Theseus for another exercise, conducting intensive night flying operations in the Mediterranean during October and returned home from Malta at the end of that year. A month later, it re-deployed to the Mediterranean back aboard HMS Indomitable, but returned home again in May to take part in the Coronation Review flypast at Spithead on 15 June 1953.

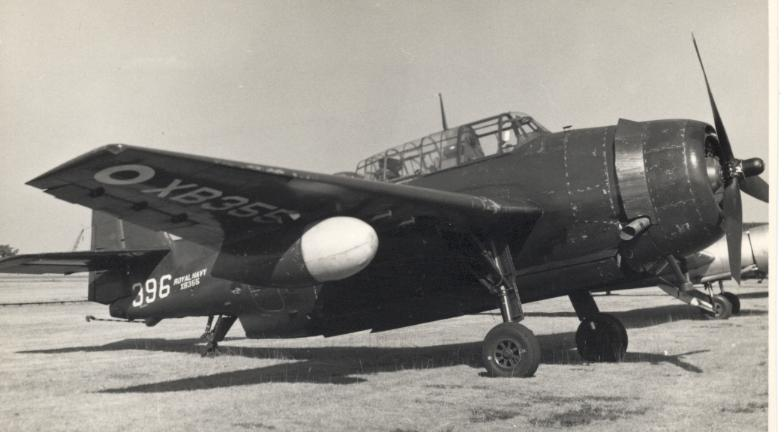
Grumman Avenger AS.5; an example of the type used by 820 Squadron

820 Squadron re-equipped with eight Avenger AS.4s at RNAS Eglinton in February 1954. In 1953, while presenting the Navy Estimates in the House of Commons, it was announced that the Grumman Avenger would return to service with the Royal Navy. The primary aim of the Avengers was to improve anti-submarine operations. Under the US Mutual Defense Assistance Program, a total of 100 post-war Avengers were supplied, specifically the TBM-3E variant used by the US Navy. The AS.4 aircraft underwent extensive modifications to comply with British standards. In July the squadron was once again Mediterranean-bound, this time in the lead ship of her class HMS Centaur. In February 1955, the aircraft flew home in stages from Hal Far, via Cagliari, Cuers and Bordeaux to RNAS Lee-on-Solent (HMS Daedalus), Hampshire, thence to RNAS Eglinton.

In March 1955, the squadron re-equipped at RNAS Eglinton with nine Gannet AS. 1s, with which it embarked in the Centaur-class light fleet carrier HMS Bulwark in September for an exercise. The Fairey Gannet, which was introduced in 1955, emerged as a crucial component of the Fleet Air Arm's capabilities for carrier-based anti-submarine warfare. It was the first aircraft globally to incorporate a dual airscrew-turbine system, merging the advantages of a twin-engine layout with the ease of a single-engine setup. Importantly, the Gannet was the first in the FAA to combine both search and strike operations, featuring a generous weapons bay and a sizable retractable radar scanner. After completion of work up it joined HMS Centaur in January 1956 for a spell in the Mediterranean before sailing through the Suez Canal for service in the Far East, during which it visited India, Pakistan and Malaya. Returning through the Mediterranean, the squadron disbanded on arrival on 15 May 1956.

The decision was made to convert 820 Squadron as a helicopter squadron.

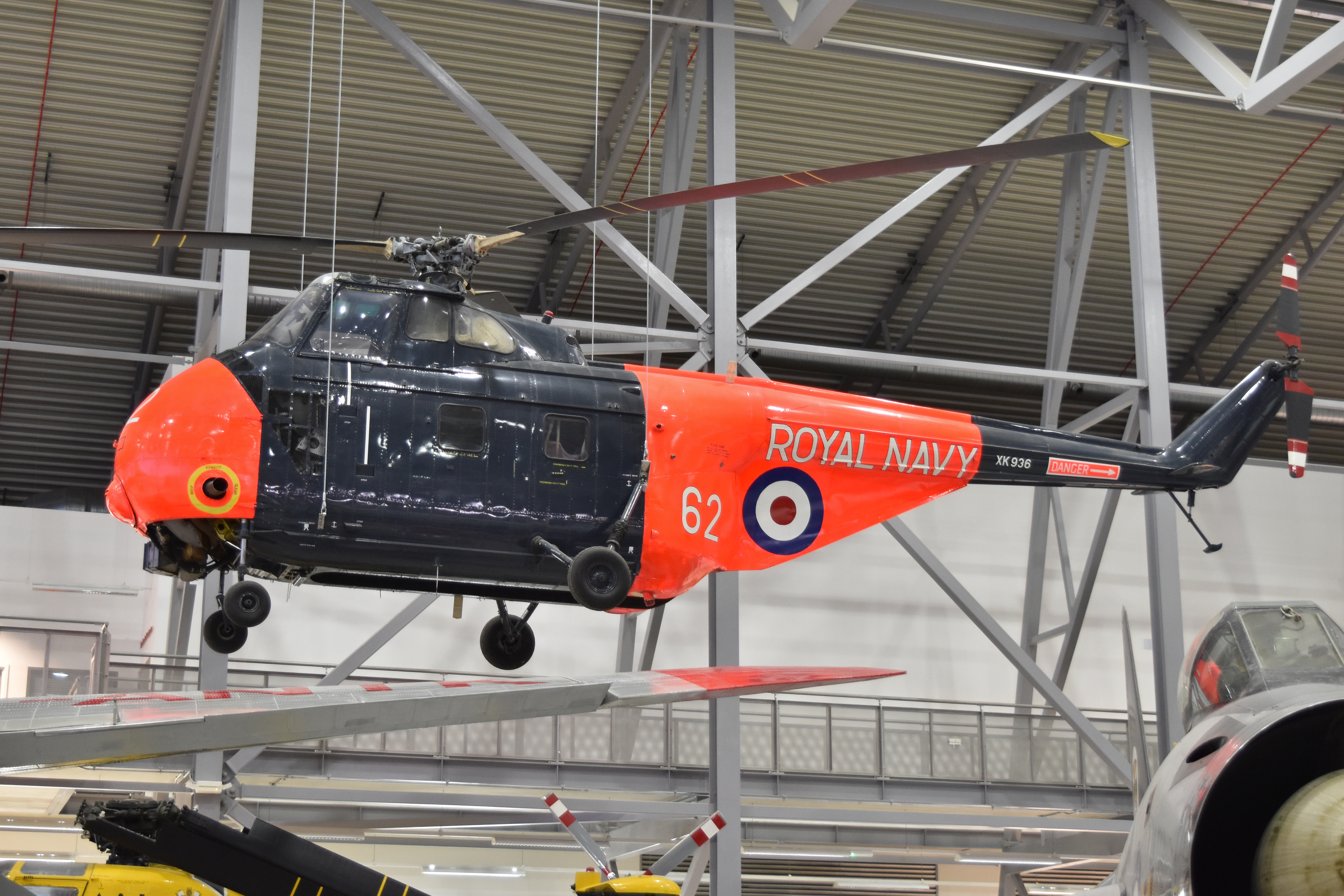
Westland Whirlwind HAS.7; used by 820 Squadron between 13 Jan - 15 May 1958

The squadron was re-established as the second anti-submarine helicopter unit at RNAS Eglinton in January 1958, equipped with eight Whirlwind HAS.7 helicopters. The Westland Whirlwind represented the British modification of the American Sikorsky S-55 helicopter. The HAS.7 was the last version of this aircraft utilised by the Fleet Air Arm, powered by a British Alvis Leonides Mk.5 engine. This model was specifically designed for primary operations in anti-submarine warfare, distinguishing it as the first British helicopter solely dedicated to such missions. It was equipped with sophisticated technology, including radar and dipping Asdic, to improve its submarine detection capabilities.

These were decreased to six prior to their embarkation in the Audacious-class aircraft carrier HMS Eagle in May, subsequently transferring directly to sister ship HMS Ark Royal the following month for a period in the Mediterranean. Shortly after their incorporation into the Centaur-class light fleet carrier HMS Albion in August, the aircraft engines began experiencing overheating issues, and subsequently, the squadron was prohibited from flying over the sea due to aircraft losses. By the end of the year, the ship departed for the Far East, and while in Hong Kong, new engines were installed. In early 1959, visits occurred in New Zealand and Australia before returning to Singapore, where the squadron was disbanded at RNAS Sembawang in May 1959.

The squadron was re-established in October 1959, once more equipped with six Whirlwind HAS.7s and was officially commissioned at RNAS Culdrose (HMS Seahawk), Cornwall, on 3 November. It then embarked in HMS Ark Royal in March 1960 for operations in the Mediterranean. In August, the ship returned to home waters for exercises before disembarking the squadron at RNAS Culdrose, where it was disbanded upon arrival on 3 October.

=== Wessex (1964-1972) ===
The squadron was re-formed in 1964, and equipped with eight Wessex HAS.1 helicopters, with which they served as an anti-submarine squadron aboard the Audacious-class aircraft carrier HMS Eagle. Developed as a substitute for the Westland Whirlwind within the FAA, the Westland Wessex was based on the American Sikorsky S-58. It was the inaugural helicopter commissioned by the FAA that was specifically designed from the beginning to function as an anti-submarine warfare aircraft. It featured an automatic pilot and was capable of operating in all weather conditions, both during the day and at night.

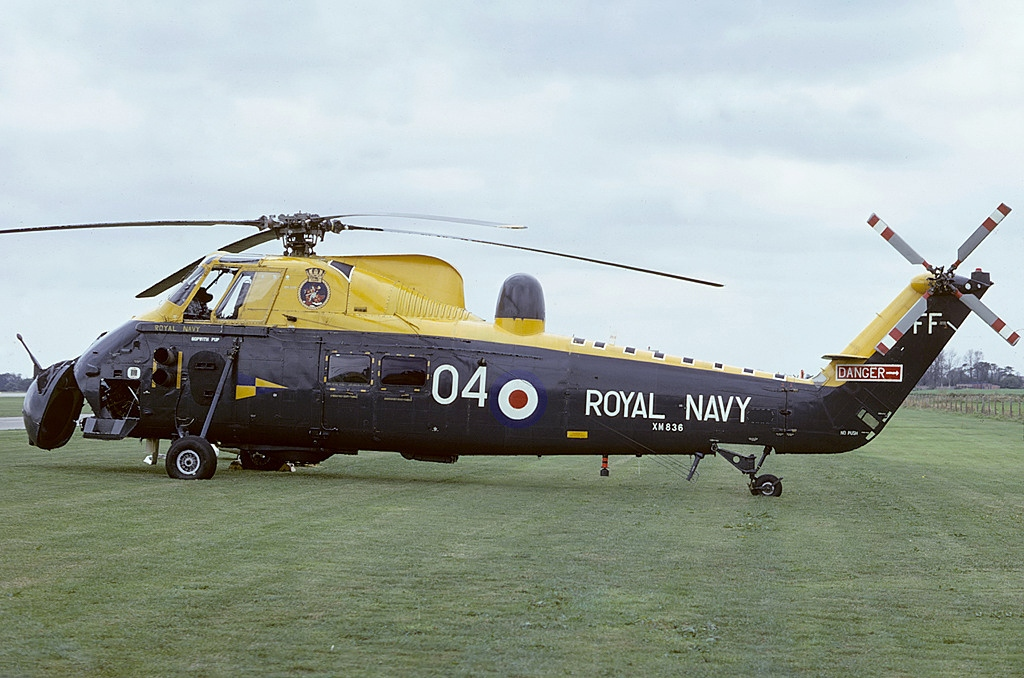
Westland Wessex HAS.3; an example of the type used by 820 Squadron

They were upgraded to the Wessex HAS.3 in May 1969, when they were transferred to the Tiger-class light cruiser, converted to a helicopter and command cruiser, HMS Blake. The HAS.3 variant exhibited greater power compared to the HAS.1. A notable external characteristic was the hump located behind the rotor head, which was part of an advanced radar system, leading to its nickname 'the camel'. Additionally, it was the inaugural FAA helicopter to implement helicopter in-flight refuelling (HIFR), allowing it to receive fuel from a ship while in the air.

In February 1970, the cruiser departed for the Far East, continuing on to Australia in May. It returned home in December, with aircraft being assigned at different intervals throughout 1971 to ships of the Royal Fleet Auxiliary, before reuniting with HMS Blake in July for a trip to the United States. Following stops in Barbados, Tenerife, and Gibraltar in November, the ship proceeded to the Mediterranean for several weeks before coming back in January 1972.

=== Sea King (1972-2003) ===
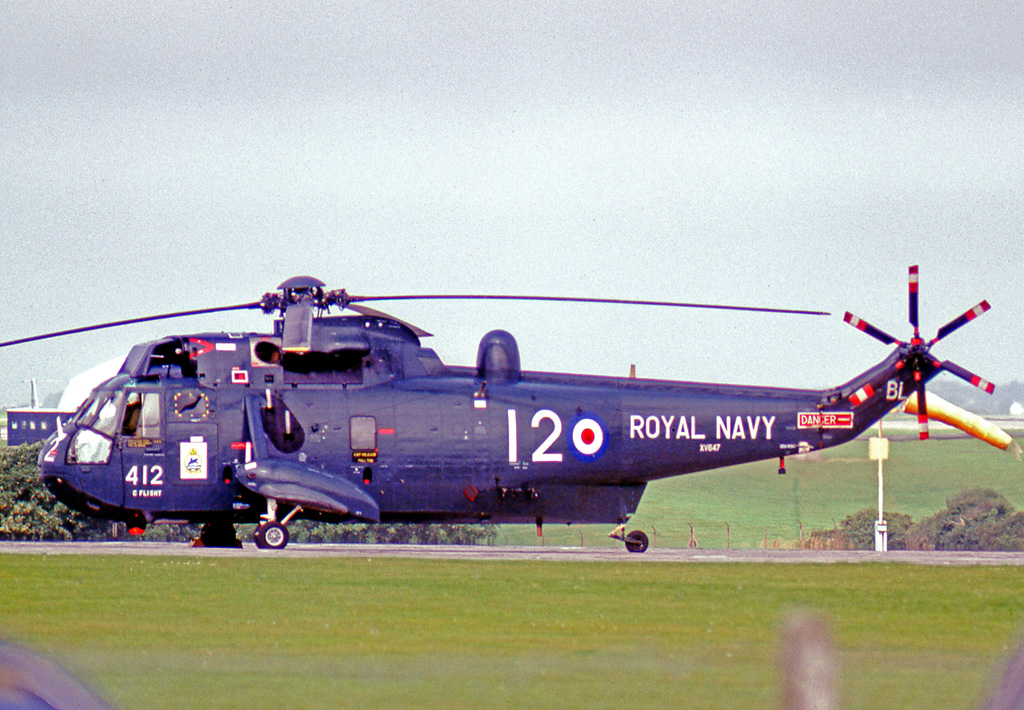
Westland Sea King HAS.2 of 820 Squadron in 1977 wearing the 'BL' code of HMS Blake

The Westland Sea King was capable of conducting missions lasting four hours and could survey an area four times larger than the Wessex. Built on the foundational airframe of the American Sikorsky S-61B, the Sea King was equipped with a power-folding, five-bladed main rotor, a retractable undercarriage and a boat-type hull with sponsons. The prototype made its inaugural flight on 8 September 1967 and went into operational service in February 1970.

In December 1972 the squadrons aircraft were upgraded with the Sea King HAS.1, a variant focused on anti-submarine warfare (ASW), followed by the HAS.2 version and then the HAS.5 in December 1980. The HAS.2 variant could be externally differentiated from its predecessor by its six-bladed tail rotor, and its power plant was upgraded to a 1,660 shp Rolls-Royce Gnome.

820 Squadron was the inaugural FAA unit to receive the Sea King HAS.5, which was deployed on the lead ship of her class HMS Invincible and became operational in June 1981. Equipped with more advanced technology than its earlier models, the HAS.5 could be recognised externally by a larger radome positioned above the fuselage. It featured a Decca 71 radar, Sea Searcher radar, an enhanced tactical air navigation system, and LAPADS (lightweight acoustic processing and display system) that operated in conjunction with signals from Jezebel passive sonobuoys; on 6 March 1981 the squadron suffered a tragedy when two of its aircraft had a mid-air collision, five of the eight crew members were killed.

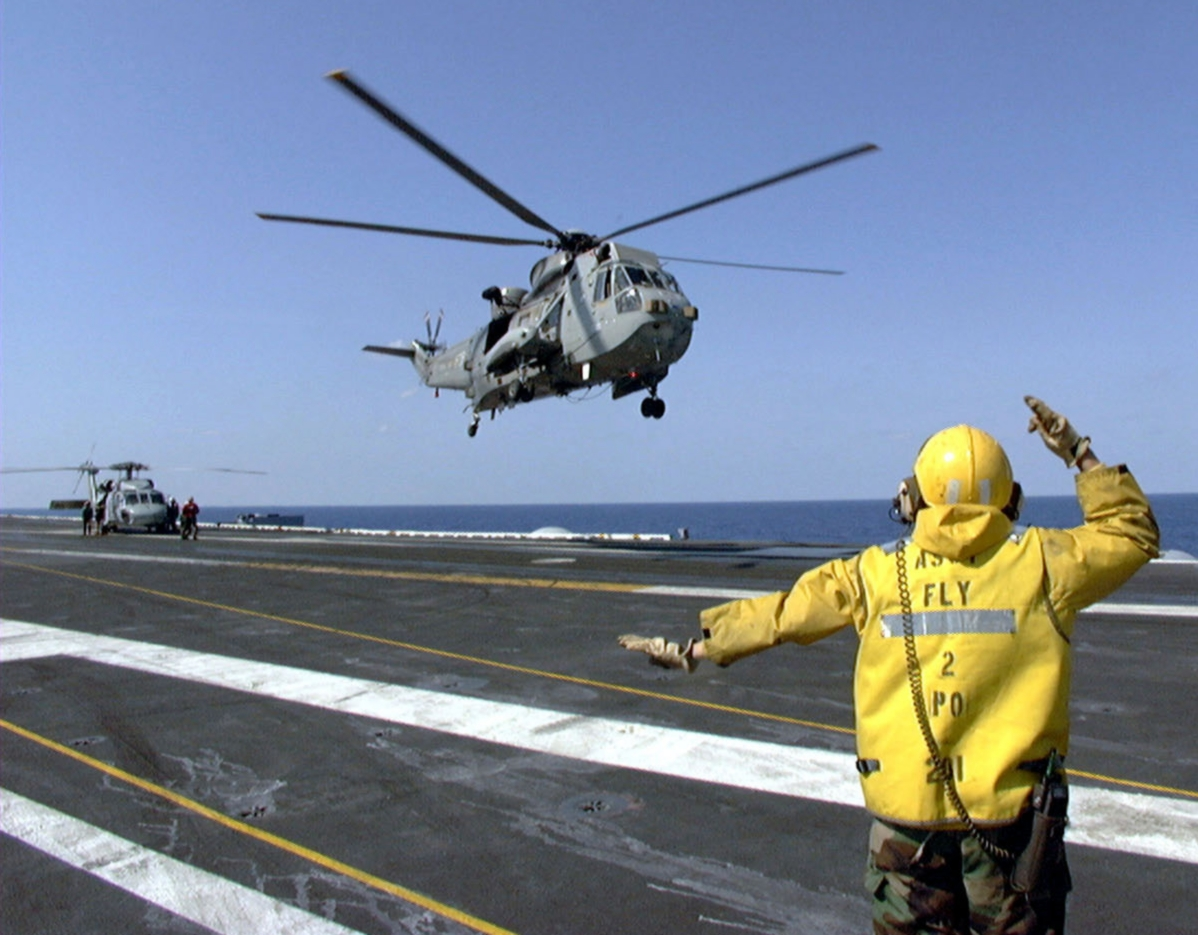
An 820 NAS Sea King HAS.6 landing on USS Enterprise, in 1996.

In April 1982 the squadron remained embarked for the Falklands War. During the conflict the squadron flew over 4,700 hours, with HMS Invincible spending 166 days continuously at sea, setting a world record for continuous carrier operations. The squadron transferred to sister ship HMS Ark Royal in late 1985.

The Sea King HAS.6 introduced enhancements to the fundamental airframe and the primary transmission system, in addition to more advanced ASW sonar and magnetic anomaly detection (MAD) systems, along with the capability to deploy Sea Eagle anti-ship missiles. The squadron was re-equipped in February 1990 with the HAS.6 and on board HMS Ark Royal were dispatched to the Eastern Mediterranean on 10 January 1991, with the intention of transiting the Suez Canal, so they would be in the Red Sea for Operation Granby the British military operations during the 1991 Gulf War. However, the war started before they could transit the Suez Canal and instead HMS Ark Royal, remained in the Eastern Mediterranean for the duration of the conflict.

In January 1993, 820 Squadron were dispatched aboard the Ol-class "fast fleet tanker" RFA Olwen and the lead ship of her class RFA Fort Grange to support the British forces in Bosnia as part of Operation Grapple. There the squadron was used to ferry men and supplies. 820 Squadron returned to Bosnia in 1994, this time aboard HMS Ark Royal.

With the later decommissioning of HMS Ark Royal, the squadron joined sister ship HMS Illustrious and by 1996 was in the eastern Atlantic, followed by a round the world deployment in 1997.

With HMS Illustrious in refit from 1998, 820 Squadron operated out of RNAS Culdrose on anti-submarine training exercises, followed with periods embarked on ships of the Royal Fleet Auxiliary. They rejoined HMS Illustrious in 1999 and participated in relief operations in Mozambique, aboard the Fort Victoria-class replenishment oiler RFA Fort George and for Operation Palliser in Sierra Leone.

820 Squadron was originally scheduled to disband in December 2002; however, this was delayed to enable the squadron's deployment to the Gulf aboard RFA Argus in January 2003 for Search and Rescue (SAR), Casualty Evacuation (Casevac), and personnel transfers during Operation Telic, which was the invasion of Iraq. After returning to the United Kingdom in May, the Sea Kings were retired in June, and the squadron was officially disbanded.

=== Merlin (2003-present) ===
820 Squadron was reformed from 824A Flight in September 2003, subsequently equipping itself with AgustaWestland Merlin HM1 helicopters designed for anti-submarine warfare in October. Further training periods followed, as well as a Search and Rescue effort in October 2004 to aid the stricken Canadian submarine HMCS Chicoutimi, which had been disabled after suffering a fire and flooding off the west coast of Ireland. Over the following years, 820 primarily operated from Royal Fleet Auxiliary vessels, engaging in operational deployments to both the Middle East and the Caribbean. In August 2007, the squadron took over from 814 Squadron at Seeb, Oman, for a year dedicated to Maritime Surveillance Operations. Following a five-month deployment aboard the Landing Platform Helicopter amphibious warfare vessel HMS Ocean, which started in February 2009, the squadron returned to Seeb for an additional period beginning in early September, and then moved to Musannah in March 2012, where it remained until relieved by 814 Squadron in April 2013.

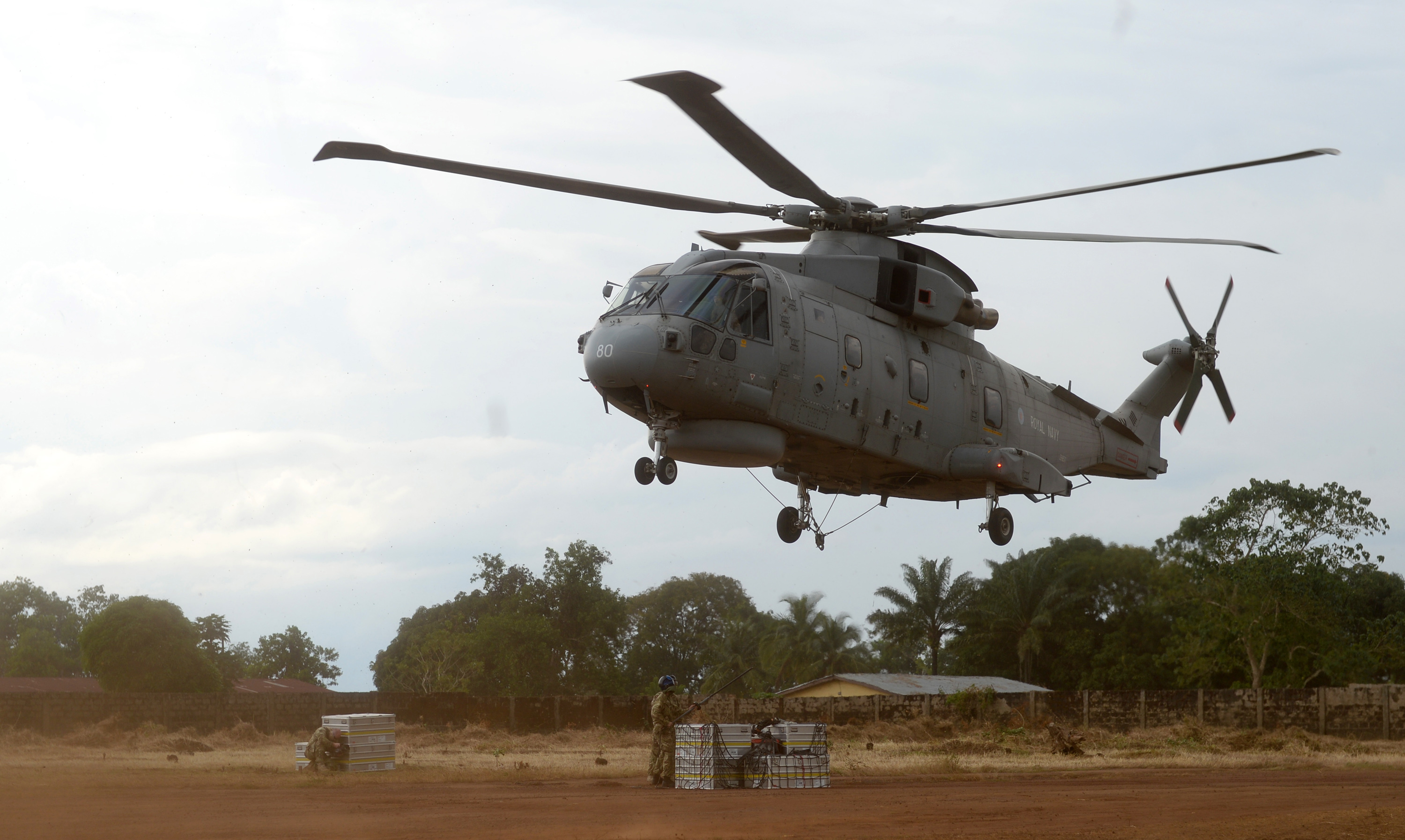
An 820 Squadron Merlin helicopter lifting urgent supplies due to the ongoing Ebola crisis in Sierra Leone

The squadron has continued to carry out exercises aboard Royal Navy and Royal Fleet Auxiliary vessels, as well as participating in military operations. It is based at RNAS Culdrose and operates the AgustaWestland Merlin HM.2. Training is performed by 824 NAS and front line duties are shared with 814 NAS. During 2014, 820 NAS was temporarily assigned to the Commando Helicopter Force until the two main troop carrying squadrons fully convert to the Merlin HC.4. 820 NAS is also known as the "Queen's squadron" and will be the main squadron to operate on the Queen Elizabeth class aircraft carrier. Three Merlins from 820 NAS were deployed off RFA Argus as the UK's response towards the 2014 Ebola virus. 820 NAS will be permanently attached to HMS Queen Elizabeth's air group. On 3 July 2017, a Merlin Mk.2 helicopter of 820 NAS became the first aircraft to land on HMS Queen Elizabeth, piloted by 26-year-old Lieutenant Luke Wraith from Yorkshire.

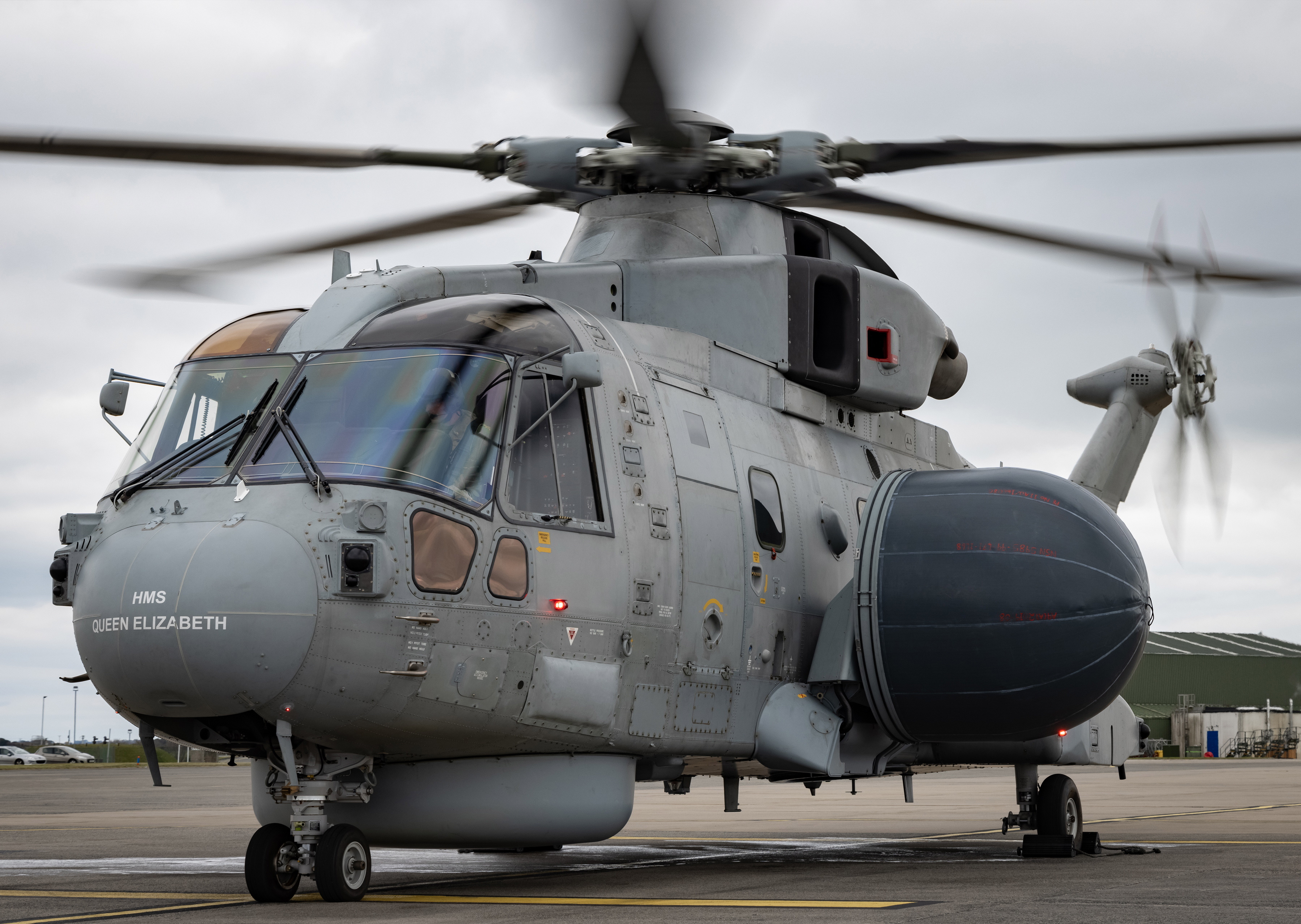
A Merlin HM2 Crowsnest AEW

In 2020, 820 NAS assumed responsibility for all Merlin HM.2 operations from the Royal Navy's carriers, when it took over the Airborne Surveillance role from 849 NAS. This will see a number of its aircraft installed with the Crowsnest system, consisting of a new version of the Searchwater radar combined with Cerberus mission system in a kit installation. This is to allow the system to be installed in any Merlin airframe. The system achieved initial operating capability in July 2023. In September, five Merlins from 820 Squadron, two in the AEW configuration, embarked on HMS Queen Elizabeth for her "Operation FIREDRAKE" deployment in northern European waters.

In 2025, the squadron embarked with the Royal Navy's carrier strike group on Operation Highmast deploying to the Indo-Pacific region. Nine of the Merlin HM2s from the squadron were specifically assigned to Prince of Wales, six in the ASW role and three in the AEW role with the Crowsnest system having reached full operating capability.

== Aircraft operated ==
The squadron has operated a number of different aircraft types, including:

- Fairey IIIF (April 1933 - November 1934)
- Fairey Seal (November 1933 - December 1934)
- Blackburn Shark Mk I (December 1934 - December 1936)
- Blackburn Baffin (August 1935 - February 1936)
- Blackburn Shark Mk II (December 1936 - September 1937)
- Fairey Swordfish I (September 1937 - June 1941)
- Fairey Albacore (July 1941 - November 1943)
- Fairey Barracuda Mk II (January - October 1944)
- Grumman Avenger Mk.I (October - November 1944)
- Grumman Avenger Mk.II (October 1944 - March 1946)
- Fairey Firefly AS.5 (July - December 1951)
- Fairey Firefly AS.6 (December 1951 - February 1954)
- Grumman Avenger AS.4 (February 1954 - March 1955)
- Fairey Gannet AS.1 (March 1955 - May 1956, July 1956 - November 1957)
- Fairey Gannet T.2 (July 1956 - November 1957)
- Westland Whirlwind HAS.7 (January 1958 - May 1959, October 1959 - October 1960)
- Westland Wessex HAS.1 (September 1964 - May 1969)
- Westland Wessex HAS.3 (May 1969 - December 1972)
- Westland Sea King HAS.1 (December 1972 - January 1977)
- Westland Sea King HAS.2 (January 1977 - June 1981)
- Westland Sea King HAS.5 (November 1980 - January 1990)
- Westland Sea King HAS.6 (December 1989 - June 2003)
- AugustaWestland Merlin HM1 (October 2003 - October 2013)
- AugustaWestland Merlin HM2 (November 2013 - date)

== Battle honours ==
The following thirteen Battle Honours have been awarded to 820 Naval Air Squadron:

- Norway 1940–44
- Spartivento 1940
- Mediterranean 1940
- "Bismarck" 1941
- Atlantic 1941
- Malta Convoys 1941
- North Africa 1942–43
- Sicily 1943
- Salerno 1943
- Palembang 1945
- Okinawa 1945
- Japan 1945
- Falkland Islands 1982

== Assignments ==
820 Naval Air Squadron was assigned as needed to form part of a number of larger units:

- 9th Naval TBR Wing (11 February - 23 October 1944
- 2nd Naval TBR Wing (designated No.2 Strike Wing) (10 December 1944 - January 1945)
- 7th Carrier Air Group (30 June 1945 - March 1946)

== Commanding officers ==
List of commanding officers of 820 Naval Air Squadron:

1933 - 1943

- Lieutenant Commander A.P. Colthurst, RN, (Squadron Leader, RAF), from 2 May 1933
- Lieutenant Commander M.S. Slattery, RN, (Squadron Leader, RAF), from 9 August 1934
- Lieutenant Commander R.G. Poole, RN, (Squadron Leader, RAF), from 15 March 1935 (Commander 31 December 1936)
- Lieutenant Commander C.A.N. Hooper, RN, (Squadron Leader, RAF), from 1 April 1937
- Lieutenant Commander A.C.G. Ermen, RN, (Squadron Leader, RAF), from 19 August 1937
- Lieutenant Commander G.B. Hodgkinson, RN, from 7 January 1939
- Lieutenant Commander A. Yeoman, RN, from 29 August 1940
- Lieutenant Commander J.A. Stewart-Moore, RN, from 27 October 1940
- Lieutenant Commander W. Elliott, RN, from 18 July 1941
- Lieutenant Commander H.I. Fisher, RNR, from 10 February 1943
- Lieutenant Commander J.C.N. Shrubsole, RN, from 4 June 1943
- disbanded - 13 November 1943

1944 - 1946

- Lieutenant Commander(A) W.R. Nowell, RN, from 1 January 1944
- Lieutenant Commander(A) S.P. Luke, RN, from 23 October 1944
- Lieutenant Commander(A) F.L. Jones, DSC & Bar, RNVR, from 18 May 1945
- Lieutenant Commander J.P. Camp, DSC and Bar, RN, from 14 June 1945
- disbanded - 16 March 1946

1951 - 1956

- Lieutenant Commander P.S. Cole, DSC, RN, from 3 July 1951 (KiFA 4 October 1951)
- Lieutenant J.P. David, RN, from 5 October 1951
- Lieutenant Commander G.C. Hathway, RN, from 21 October 1951
- Lieutenant Commander W.L. Hughes, RN, from 22 July 1953
- Lieutenant Commander A.D. Cassidi, RN, from 19 February 1955
- Lieutenant Commander A.H. Smith, RN, from 18 May 1955
- disbanded - 15 May 1956

1956 - 1957

- Lieutenant Commander D.O'D. Newbery, RN, from 30 July 1956
- disbanded - 2 December 1957

1958 - 1959

- Lieutenant Commander F.W. Wilcox, RN, from 21 January 1958
- disbanded - 8 May 1959

1959 - 1960

- Lieutenant Commander W.W. Threlfall, RN, from 3 November 1959
- disbanded - 3 October 1960

1964 - 2003

- Lieutenant Commander D.C. Smith, RN, from 23 September 1964
- Lieutenant Commander P. Burton, RN, from 23 February 1966
- Lieutenant Commander A. Casdagli, RN, from 7 May 1967
- Lieutenant Commander J.B.A. Hawkins, RN, from 26 February 1969
- Lieutenant Commander P.R. Lloyd, RN, from 28 October 1970
- Lieutenant Commander D.P. Edwards, RN, from 13 April 1972
- Lieutenant Commander G.E.G. Brown, RN, from 14 January 1974
- Lieutenant Commander C.A. Robertson, RN, from 9 July 1975
- Lieutenant Commander J.S. Turton, RN, from 3 November 1976
- Lieutenant Commander J.D.StJ. Ainslie, RN, from 17 March 1978
- Lieutenant Commander C.P. Young, RN, from 5 November 1979
- Lieutenant Commander R.J.S. Wykes-Sneyd, AFC, RN, from 12 June 1980
- Lieutenant Commander G.C. Hunt, RN, from 16 March 1983
- Lieutenant Commander A.J.M. Hogg, AFC, RN, from 7 September 1984 (Commander 30 June 1985)
- Lieutenant Commander C.P. Robinson, RN, from 5 October 1985
- Lieutenant Commander J.M. Knowles, RN, from 7 February 1987
- Lieutenant Commander N.J.K. Dedman, RN, from 28 February 1989
- Lieutenant Commander M.D. Piggott, RN, from 26 March 1991
- Lieutenant Commander P.A. Barber, RN, from 12 June 1992
- Lieutenant Commander C.F. Douglas, RN, from 14 June 1994
- Lieutenant Commander A. McKie, RN, from 21 September 1995
- Lieutenant Commander M.P. Jennings, RN, from 31 May 1997
- Lieutenant Commander R.J. Bridger, RN, from 16 July 1999
- Lieutenant Commander I.S.T. Fitter, RN, from 10 June 2001 (Commander 30 June 2002)
- disbanded - 20 June 2003

2003 - present

- Lieutenant Commander R.M.H. Dane, MBE, RN, from 1 September 2003
- Lieutenant Commander K.M. Dodd, RN, from 12 March 2005
- Commander J.K.L. Boddington, RN, from 22 March 2007
- Commander J.P. Phillips, RN, 2 December 2008
- Commander C.A. Godwin, RN, from 8 December 2011
- Commander R.S. Spooner, OBE, RN, from 28 January 2014
- Commander J.E.J. Holroyd, RN, from 8 February 2016

Note: Abbreviation (A) signifies Air Branch of the RN or RNVR.

== See also ==
- Benjamin Bathurst (Royal Navy officer) - Admiral of the Fleet and former First Sea Lord and Chief of the Naval Staff, a former 820 Squadron senior pilot
- Keith Blount - Admiral and NATO's Deputy Supreme Allied Commander Europe, a former 820 Squadron pilot
- British Order of Battle at the Aden Emergency
- Falklands War order of battle: British naval forces
- United Kingdom Carrier Strike Group 21
- War against the Islamic State aerial order of battle
- Exercise Strikeback
