= Dale-class tanker =

Class of three tankers chartered for service for the Royal Fleet Auxiliary

Class overview
- Name: Dale class
- Builders: Kieler Howaldstwerke; Hitachi; Harland & Wolff
- Operators: Royal Fleet Auxiliary
- Preceded by: Leaf class
- Succeeded by: Rover class
- In service: 1967–1977
- Completed: 3
- Retired: 3

General characteristics
- Type: Mobile reserve tanker
- Displacement: Derwentdale: 88,555 long tons (89,976 t); Dewdale: 67,000 long tons (68,075 t); Ennerdale: 62,000 long tons (62,995 t)
- Length: Derwentdale: 799 ft (244 m); Dewdale: 774 ft (236 m); Ennerdale: 710 ft (220 m)
- Beam: Derwentdale: 117 ft 8 in (35.86 m); Dewdale: 107 ft (33 m); Ennerdale: 98 ft (30 m)
- Draught: Derwentdale: 42 ft 3 in (12.88 m); Dewdale: 41 ft (12 m); Ennerdale: 40 ft (12 m)
- Propulsion: Burmeister and Wain Diesels
- Speed: Derwentdale: 15.5 knots (17.8 mph; 28.7 km/h); Dewdale: 15 knots (17 mph; 28 km/h)
- Complement: Derwentdale: 56; Dewdale and Ennerdale: 51

The Dale class consisted of three tankers chartered for service with the Royal Fleet Auxiliary (RFA), the naval auxiliary fleet of the United Kingdom. In 1967. They served for a number of years supporting Royal Navy and allied fleet operations, during which one, Ennerdale, was lost. The remaining two were returned to their original owners in the mid-1970s.

== Overview ==
Three large modern tankers, built to varying designs in the mid-1960s, were charted by the Royal Fleet Auxiliary to support naval operations east of the Suez Canal, in the waters of the Indian Ocean and the Far East.

They were given traditional RFA names, reusing three names that had been used for the Second World War-era Dale-class oilers. They were not fitted with equipment to allow them to replenish ships at sea, and were classified instead as 'Mobile Reserve Tankers'.

The smallest, RFA Ennerdale was also the shortest lived. She hit a coral reef and sank off Port Victoria on 1 June 1970. The wreck was subsequently destroyed with explosives fired from Wessex helicopters to prevent an oil spillage from threatening the Seychelles.

RFA Derwentdale was returned to her original owners in 1974, but RFA Dewdale remained in service until 1977. During this time Dewdale saw service with the Aden task force during the British withdrawal in 1967, and was then active then on the Beira Patrols. She was the last to leave service with the RFA, being returned in 1977 and commencing service under her old name of Edenfield.

== Background ==
In July 1967, the MOD announced that it had bareboat chartered, for a period of seven years, three large tankers for the Royal Fleet Auxiliary. These vessels were the largest in the RFA fleet at the time.

=== Comparison ===
Dale-Class Mobile Reserve Tankers
Tonnages
Name	Gross register tonnage	Net register tonnage	Deadweight tonnage	Displacement (full load tonnage)
Derwentdale	42,343	28,288	73,375	88,555
Dewdale	35,642	24,504	63,588	67,000
Ennerdale	29,189	18,066	49,209	62,000
Dimensions
Name	Length oa	Beam	Draught	Depth
Derwentdale	798ft 11in	117ft 10in	42ft 6in	55ft 4in
Dewdale	774ft 6in	107ft 10in	41ft 5in	55ft
Ennerdale	710ft	98ft 7in	37ft 6in	51ft 10in

Machinery & Speed
Name	Engine	bhp	Shaft	Speed
Derwentdale	1 x Hitachi/B&W 9-cylinder diesel	20,700bhp	single shaft	15.5 knots
Dewdale	1 x H&W/B&W 9-cylinder diesel	17,000bhp	single shaft	15 knots
Ennerdale	1 x Krupp/B&W 8-cylinder diesel	16,800bhp	single shaft	15.5 knots

== Ships ==
Name	Pennant	Builder	Laid down	Launched	Completed	In RFA Service	Fate
Derwentdale (ex-Halcyon Breeze)	A221	Hitachi, Innoshima, Japan	-	18 January 1964	April 1964	1967 – 1975	to previous owners, then sold and renamed Alnajdi
Dewdale (ex-Edenfield)	A129	Harland & Wolff, Belfast, Northern Ireland	-	5 March 1965	2 July 1965	August 1967 - September 1977	to previous owners as Edenfield, then sold and renamed World Field
Ennerdale (ex-Naess Scotsman)	A213	Kieler Howaldstwerke Kiel, Germany	-	31 August 1962	1963	1967 – 1970	Wrecked and sunk on 1 June 1970

=== Derwentdale ===
Derwentdale was launched as Halcyon Breeze by Hitachi Zosen Corporation at its Innoshima, Hiroshima shipyard on 18 January 1964, for Caribbean Tankers Ltd, managed by Court Line(Ship Management) Ltd, London. She began her RFA charter on 17 June 1967.

=== Dewdale ===
Dewdale was launched as Edenfield for Hunting (Eden) Tankers Ltd, managed by Hunting & Son Ltd, by Harland & Wolff on 5 March 1965 and began her charter on 14 August 1967.

=== Ennerdale ===
Ennerdale was launched on 31 August 1963 as Naess Scotsman for the Anglo-Norness Shipping Co Ltd and began her charter in July 1967.

== See also ==
- List of replenishment ships of the Royal Fleet Auxiliary
