= Royal Naval School of Flight Deck Operations =

- RNSFDO, SFDO
- Location within Cornwall
- Former names: Royal Naval School of Aircraft Handling

General information
- Type: Training centre
- Location: Cornwall, TR12 7RH
- Coordinates: 50.0874°N 5.2489°W
- Elevation: 80 m (262 ft)
- Completed: 1959
- Inaugurated: 1959
- Client: Fleet Air Arm
- Owner: Royal Navy

The Royal Naval School of Flight Deck Operations is the Fleet Air Arm's training establishment for aircraft handling.

== History ==
767 Naval Air Squadron and 769 Naval Air Squadron were formed at RNAS Donibristle in May 1939. 768 Naval Air Squadron was formed at RNAS Arbroath (now a Royal Marines base from 1971) in 1941, being disbanded at RNAS Eglinton, in Northern Ireland, in 1949. From 1943 there was another deck landing school at RNAS East Haven at Arbroath in Scotland, with 731 Naval Air Squadron and 767 Naval Air Squadron. In the early 1950s 738 Naval Air Squadron had a deck landing school in Cornwall.

In the 1950s a site was at HMS Siskin at Gosport, that taught aircraft marshalling, for Hawker Sea Hawks of 806 Naval Air Squadron.

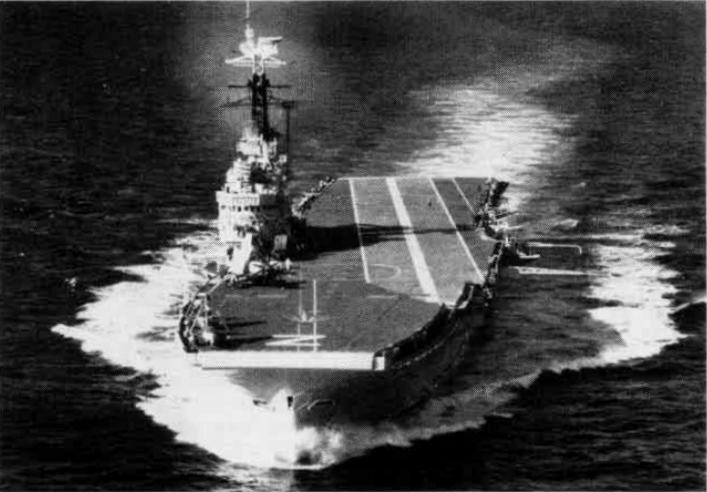
Centaur-class HMS Albion in 1956, with angled flight deck

HMS Centaur (R06), commissioned in 1953, was modified in April 1954 at Portsmouth, to have the first angled flight deck in the Royal Navy.

It was known as the School of Aircraft Handling until November 1995, when the officer unit in Dorset joined. The whole site was at Gosport until 1957, and moved again in November 1959 to Cornwall. It included Naval Air Command Fire School. In the late 1990s the chief fire instructor was Chief Petty Officer Martyn Pennell. Females first began in 1992.

The current site officially opened in October 1995.

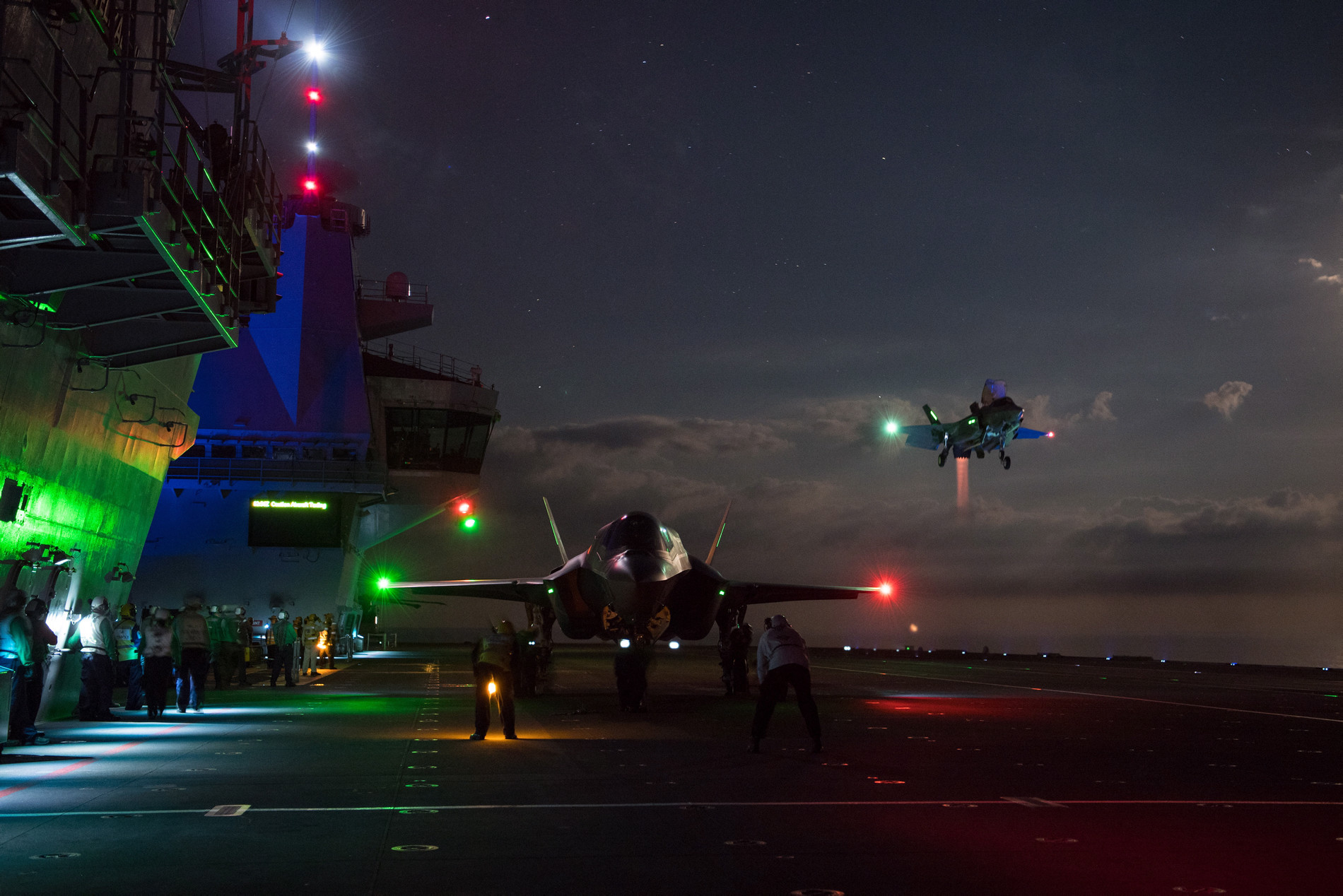
First night-time trials in September 2018

== Training ==
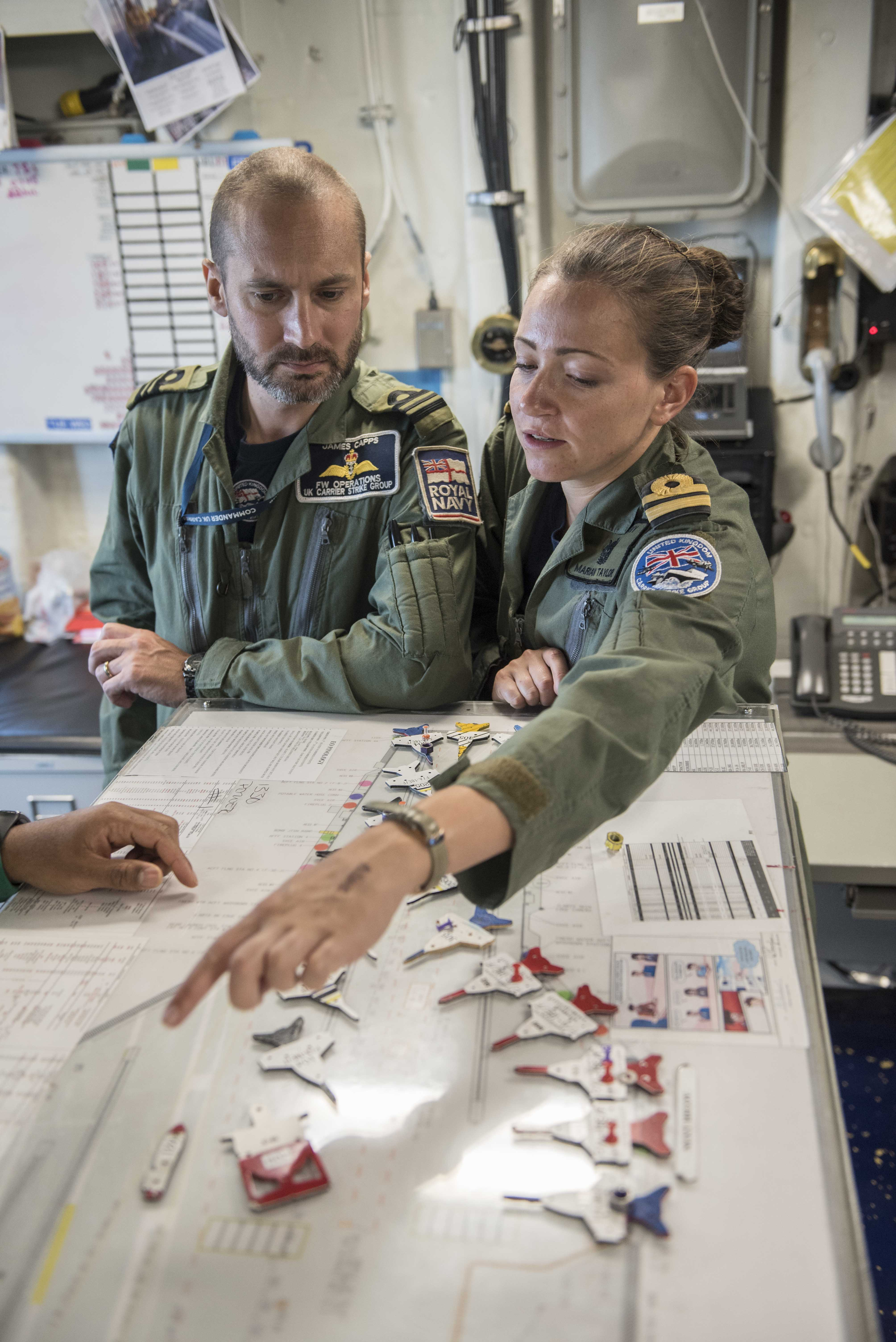
Training in July 2017, on board a US carrier

The site trains around 1500 sailors per year. Training includes a 15 week course for aircraft handlers (AH) and flight deck officers.

- Air 153, for driving naval fire service (CFR) vehicles
- Air 199, Instruction on the Carriage of Dangerous Goods
- Air 302, flight safety
- NVQ Level 2 in Providing Aviation Operations on the Ground (City and Guilds and EAL)

In the 1990s the aircraft handling course was 16 weeks.

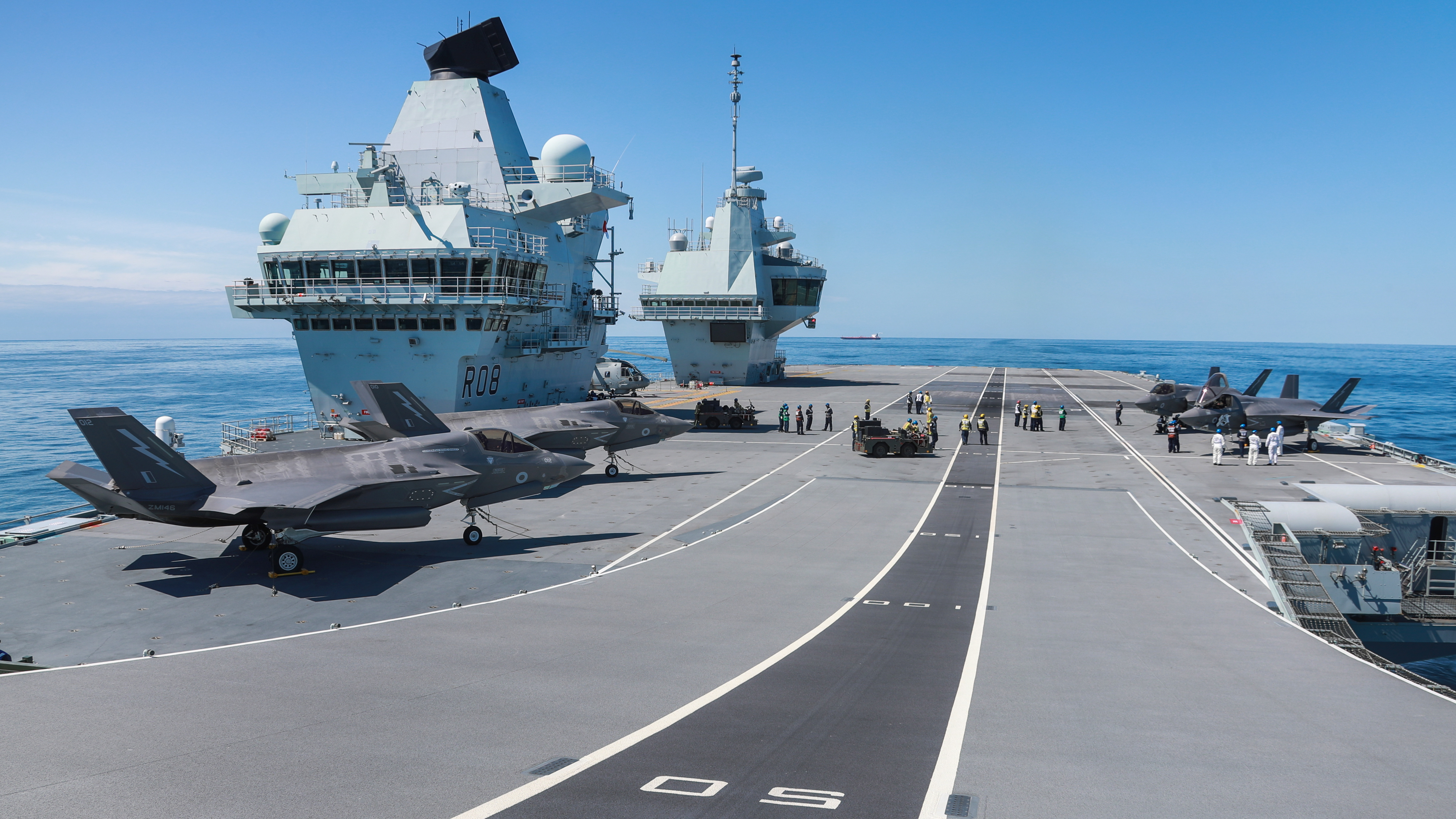
Carrier sea training in June 2020

== Structure ==
A new Flight Deck Training Simulator was built in November 2015 by Systems Engineering and Assessment (SEA) of Frome, costing £500,000. It has Kinect motion sensing.

Four F-35 models were built in June 2017 by Gateguards Ltd of Cornwall.

The site has a 600ft practice flight deck.

=== Commanding officers ===
- Early 1980s, Cmdr Danny McFadzean

== See also ==
- RAF School of Air Operations Control, now part of the Defence College of Air and Space Operations
- 1700 Naval Air Squadron
- Category:Aircraft carrier fires
