= SS Mormacmail =

SS Mormacmail may refer to one of several Type C3 ships built for the United States Maritime Commission on behalf of Moore-McCormack Lines:

- SS Mormacmail (1940) (MC hull number 49), built by Sun Shipbuilding; delivered to Moore-McCormack in May 1940; acquired by the United States Navy in March 1941 for conversion to escort carrier USS Long Island (CVE-1); sold for commercial use in 1948; scrapped 1977
- SS Mormacmail (MC hull number 160), built by Ingalls Shipbuilding; laid down as Mormacmail but acquired by United States Navy for conversion to escort carrier and launched as Altamaha (CVE-6); transferred to the Royal Navy under Lend-Lease as HMS Battler (D18) of the Royal Navy's Attacker class; returned to U.S. custody in 1946 and scrapped the same year
- SS Mormacmail (1942) (MC hull number 233), built at Todd Shipyard (Tacoma, Washington); converted to escort carrier for transfer to the Royal Navy under Lend-Lease; served as HMS Tracker (D24) of the Royal Navy's Attacker class; returned to U.S. custody in 1945 and sold for commercial service in 1946; scrapped in 1964
- SS Mormacmail (1945) (MC hull number 2869, Type C3-S-A5), built by Ingalls Shipbuilding; delivered to Moore-McCormack in November 1946; scrapped in 1971
