= HMS Battler =

1942 Attacker-class escort carrier of the Royal Navy

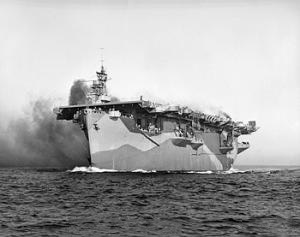
- HMS Battler (D18)

History

United States
- Name: Mormacmail; Altamaha
- Namesake: Moore-McCormack Lines, Inc.; Altamaha Sound, Georgia
- Operator: Moore-McCormack Lines, Inc. (intended)
- Ordered: as a C3-S-A1 hull MC-160
- Awarded: 9 September 1940
- Builder: Ingalls Shipbuilding, Pascagoula, Mississippi
- Cost: $7,303,768
- Yard number: 293
- Way number: 6
- Laid down: 15 April 1941
- Launched: 4 April 1942
- Acquired: 31 October 1942
- Renamed: Altamaha, 7 Jan 1942; name cancelled, 17 Mar 1942
- Reclassified: ACV, 20 Aug 1942; CVE, 15 July 1943
- Identification: Hull symbol: AVG-6; ACV-6; CVE-6
- Fate: Allocated to the Royal Navy, 17 March 1942; Transferred to the Royal Navy, 31 October 1942

United Kingdom
- Name: Battler
- Namesake: fighter or warrior skilled in the art of combat
- Acquired: 31 October 1942
- Commissioned: 31 October 1942
- Decommissioned: 12 February 1946
- Identification: Pennant number: D18
- Honours and awards: Atlantic 1942-1945, Salerno 1943, Indian Ocean.
- Fate: Returned to USN, 12 February 1946

United States
- Name: CVE-6
- Acquired: 12 February 1946
- Stricken: 28 March 1946
- Fate: Sold for scrap, 14 May 1946

General characteristics
- Class & type: Bogue-class escort carrier (USA); Attacker-class escort carrier (UK)
- Displacement: 8,390 long tons (8,520 t) (standard); 13,980 long tons (14,200 t) (full load)
- Length: 465 ft (142 m) (wl); 495 ft 8 in (151.08 m) (oa); 440 ft (130 m) (fd)
- Beam: 69 ft 6 in (21.18 m) wl; 82 ft (25 m) (fd); 111 ft 6 in (33.99 m) (extreme width)
- Draught: 23 ft 3 in (7.09 m) (mean); 26 ft (7.9 m) (max)
- Installed power: 2 × Foster-Wheeler 285 psi (1,970 kPa) boilers; 8,500 shp (6,300 kW)
- Propulsion: 1 × Allis-Chalmers steam turbine; 1 × Screw
- Speed: 18 kn (33 km/h; 21 mph)
- Complement: 646
- Armament: 2 × 4 in (102 mm)/50 caliber MK 9 guns; 4 × twin 40 mm (1.57 in) Bofors anti-aircraft guns (AA) (4×2); 8 × twin 20 mm (0.79 in) Oerlikon AA cannons; 10 × single 20 mm Oerlikon AA cannons
- Aircraft carried: 24
- Aviation facilities: 1 × hydraulic catapult; 2 × elevators

HMS Battler (D18) was an American-built escort carrier that served with the Royal Navy during the Second World War.

Converted from a merchantman under construction, she was acquired by the United States Navy on 31 October 1942, as a Bogue-class escort carrier; she was transferred to the Royal Navy and commissioned Battler on the same day under the Lend-Lease agreement.

Battler's first duty was as a convoy escort in the Battle of the Atlantic. The ship was active in the Mediterranean, Indian Ocean, and later, the war in the Pacific. She served as a convoy escort, aircraft ferry, and anti-submarine escort during the war.

== Construction ==
She was laid down on 15 April 1941, as a C3-S-A1, the third replacement for the freighter Mormacmail, for Moore-McCormack Lines, Inc., under Maritime Commission contract at Pascagoula, Mississippi, by Ingalls Shipbuilding, MC Hull 160. She was purchased by the United States Navy on 7 January 1942, for conversion to a Bogue-class escort carrier and renamed Altamaha. On 17 March 1942, her name was cancelled and she was assigned to be transferred to the Royal Navy under Lend-Lease. She was launched on 4 April 1942; sponsored by Mrs. Marguerite M. Seymour, the wife of Captain Phillip Seymour, USN. She was redesignated ACV on 20 August 1942. Acquired by the United States Navy on 31 October 1942, she was immediately transferred to the United Kingdom on the same day. She was renamed HMS Battler (D18) and commissioned into the Royal Navy on 15 November 1942, as an Attacker-class escort carrier.

== Design and description ==
There were eleven Attacker-class in service with the Royal Navy during the Second World War. They were built between 1941 and 1942, by Seattle-Tacoma Shipbuilding Corporation, Ingalls Shipbuilding, and Western Pipe & Steel shipyards in the United States.

The ship had complement of 646 men, who lived in crew accommodation that was significantly different from the arrangements that were normal for the Royal Navy at the time. The separate messes no longer had to prepare their own food, as everything was cooked in the galley and served cafeteria style in a central dining area. They were also equipped with a modern laundry and a barber shop. The traditional hammocks were replaced by three-tier bunk-beds, 18 to a cabin, which were hinged and could be tied up to provide extra space when not in use.

Battler had an overall length of 495 ft 8 in (151.08 m), a beam of 69 ft 6 in (21.18 m) and a draught of 24 ft 8 in (7.52 m). She displaced 14,170 long tons (14,400 t) at full load. Power was provided by two boilers feeding steam to a turbine driving one shaft, giving 8,500 bhp (6,300 kW), which could propel the ship at 18 kn (33 km/h; 21 mph).

She had the operating capacity for up to 24 aircraft, which could be a mixture of anti-submarine and fighter aircraft; the British Hawker Sea Hurricane and Supermarine Seafire naval fighters, Fairey Swordfish torpedo bomber or the American-supplied Grumman Martlet and Vought F4U Corsair fighters or Grumman Avenger torpedo bomber could be carried. The exact composition of the embarked squadrons depended upon the mission. Some squadrons were composite squadrons for convoy defence and would be equipped with both anti-submarine and fighter aircraft, while other squadrons working in a strike carrier role would only be equipped with fighter aircraft. Aircraft facilities were a small combined bridge–flight control on the starboard side and above the 450 ft × 120 ft (137 m × 37 m) flight deck, two aircraft lifts 42 ft × 34 ft (13 m × 10 m), and nine arrestor wires. Aircraft could be housed in the 260 ft × 62 ft (79 m × 19 m) hangar below the flight deck. When employed as an aircraft transport she could carry 90 aircraft.

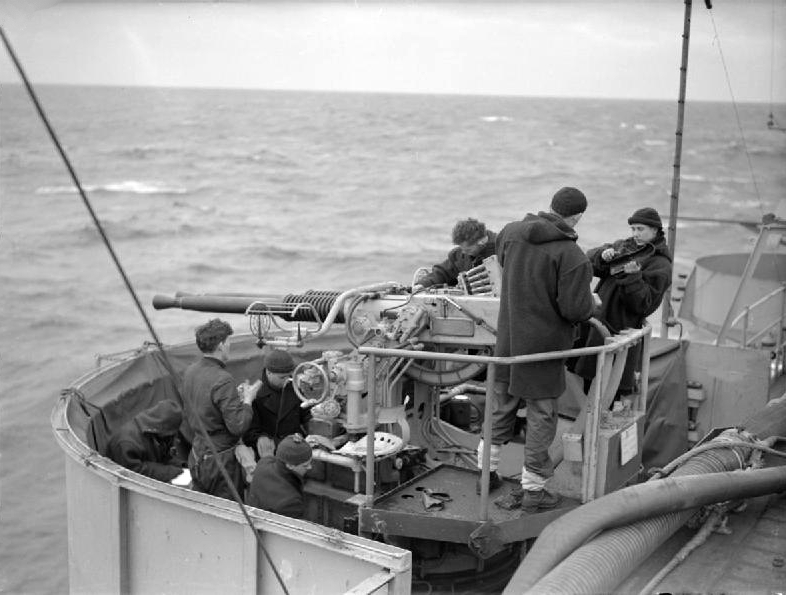
A typical twin 40 mm Bofors anti-aircraft gun mounting on the Attacker-class.

The ships armament concentrated on anti-aircraft (AA) defence and consisted of eight 40 mm (1.57 in) Bofors guns in twin mounts and ten 20 mm (0.79 in) Oerlikon cannons in single and eight in twin mounts. In addition, she had two 4 in (100 mm)/50 caliber Mk 9 guns for surface action.

Battler was designed to accompany other ships forming the escort for convoys. The anti-submarine aircraft employed were initially the Fairey Swordfish and later the Grumman Avenger, which could be armed with torpedoes, depth charges, 250 lb (110 kg) bombs or RP-3 rocket projectiles. As well as carrying out their own attacks on U-Boats, these aircraft identified their locations for the convoy's escorts to mount an attack. Typically anti-submarine patrols would be flown between dawn and dusk. One aircraft would fly about 10 mi (16 km) ahead of the convoy, while another patrolled astern. Patrols would last between two and three hours, using both radar and visual observation in their search for U-Boats. Battler also had a secondary role, providing oil and provisions for her accompanying destroyers. This could be a lengthy process and was done on the move. It took 40 minutes from firing a line across to the destroyer to start pumping oil, while it took another two hours to pump 98 tons of oil and a further 35 minutes to disconnect the hose pipe and secure the equipment.

== Service history ==
Battler began her sea trials in early November 1942, but had to put in at New Orleans, 9 November, for repairs after striking a jetty. With repairs finished by 15 November, she returned to trials until 23 November, when she arrived at Norfolk Navy Yard, in Virginia. Here defects found during her trials were rectified and modification work carried out.

Beginning 8 December 1942, Battler embarked the Naval Air Squadrons 890, 892, and 894 consisting of six Martlet IVs each. On 11 December, she sailed for the east coast of Florida, to embark six Swordfish of 840 squadron on 12 December. Battler arrived in New York City, on 18 December, and proceeded to Todd Erie Basin Dry Docks, Inc. to clean out her fuel tanks.

On 21 December 1942, Battler sailed for Liverpool, with Convoy HX 220. On 26 December, 840 squadron disembarked for NAS Quonset Point, for further work-up. After a stormy crossing Battler arrived on the Clyde on 8 January 1943, where 890, 892 and 894 squadrons disembarked to RNAS Machrihanish, then she proceeded to Harland and Wolff, for refit to Royal Navy standards, arriving 12 January.

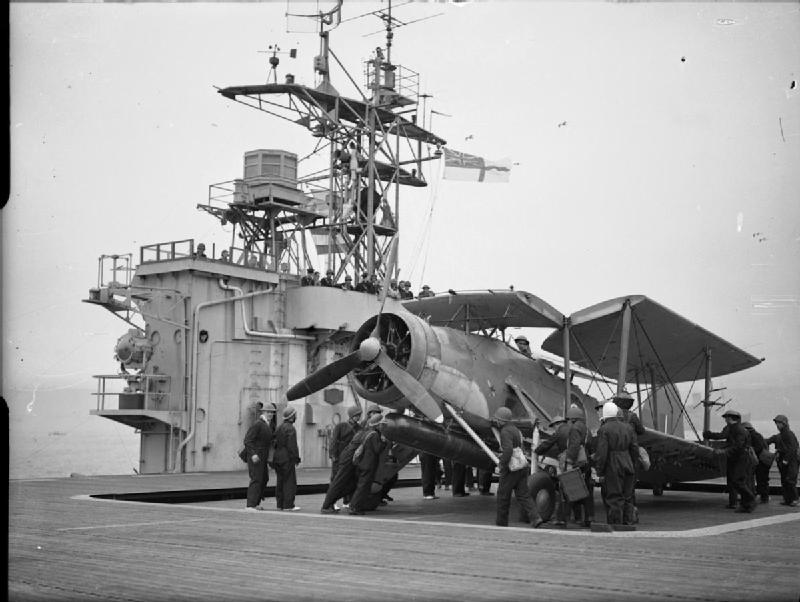
Maintenance crew bringing a torpedo-loaded Fairey Swordfish of 835 Squadron, Fleet Air Arm onto the flight deck of Battler by hydraulic lift. The escort carrier's island can be seen in the background.

After completing her refit, Battler sailed for Greenock, on 4 April, for trials. The ship's air group was brought on board on 10 April 1943, and consisted of six Swordfish II biplanes, former torpedo planes given a new lease on life as an antisubmarine aircraft, of the Fleet Air Arm's 835 squadron and nine Seafires of 808 squadron.

Battler embarked 20 Seafires and 2 Hurricane IICs at RNAMY Belfast, on 23 May, for ferrying to Gibraltar. Departing Belfast, Northern Ireland, on 4 June 1943, she took on five Swordfish from 835 squadron, on 5 June, along with four Seafires from 808 squadron from RNAS Yeovilton, the next day. She joined the destroyers Tyrian and Tumult on June 6, with orders to overtake Convoy OS 49, which had sailed from Liverpool, for Gibraltar, on 4 June, to provide air cover. Throughout the voyage, her aircraft conducted antisubmarine patrols, reaching Gibraltar, on 14 June. She returned to the British Isles eight days later, as part of the escort for Convoy KMS 16 and XK 9. Battler launched two Seafires at 2230 on 24 June, to deal with a four engined Focke Wulf FW 200 "Condor" which was shadowing the convoy. Within 12 minutes, the pilots reported triumphantly that the "Condor" had been shot down. Reaching Greenock, on 28 June, Battler had proved herself efficient on her maiden convoy escort venture.

=== Mediterranean ===
==== Operation Avalanche ====
Battler set sail for Gibraltar, and the Mediterranean theatre, on 2 August, along with her sister ships Attacker, Hunter, and Stalker, from Clyde. She was to provide air cover for Operation Avalanche, the invasion of Salerno, Italy.

On 1 September 1943, Battler became part of "Task Force 88", consisting of the escort carriers Attacker, Hunter, Stalker, the aircraft repair ship Unicorn, the cruisers Euryalus, Scylla, Charybdis, the destroyers Cleveland, Holcombe, Atherstone, Liddesdale, Farndale, Calpe, and the Polish destroyers Ślązak and Krakowiak. Battler arrived at Malta, 5 September, and sailed for Salerno, on 8 September. The carriers were to provide air cover during the landings, with up to 20 aircraft in flight at a time. It had been planned that at least one of the enemy airfields would be taken on the first day of the invasion, but it took until the third day for this to happen. Since the escort carriers were designed for anti-submarine warfare (A/S), none of them were equipped for fighter direction, this was provided by the Fighter Direction Ship Ulster Queen.

On 12 September, the task force withdrew to Palermo, Sicily, for replenishment, returning 16 September. On 20 September, Attacker, Hunter, and Stalker returned to the United Kingdom for refit and replacement aircraft, while Battler proceeded to Gibraltar. She was assigned to the Eastern Fleet for duty protecting Bombay to Aden convoys.

=== Indian Ocean ===
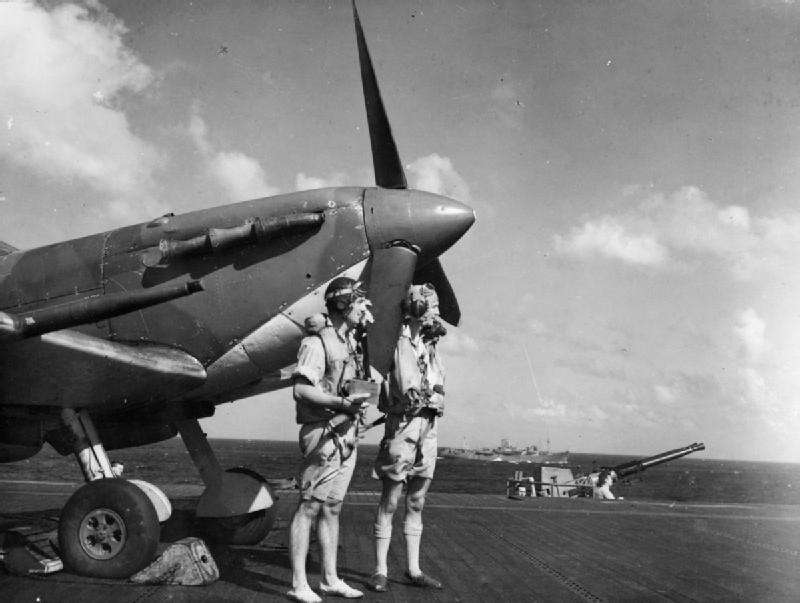
Two pilots of 834 Squadron, Fleet Air Arm standing by the nose of a Supermarine Seafire on the flight deck of Battler off the coast of Greenock. The barrels and part of the breech of one of the twin 40 mm Bofors guns can be seen in the background.

On 22 September 1943, Battler embarked 834 squadron and joined Carlisle, Aldenham, Rockwood, and the Greek destroyers Kanaris, Miaoulis, and Themistoklis escorting Convoy KMF 24 en route to Port Said. On 28 September, she arrived in Port Said, and after passing through the Suez Canal, sailed for Aden, arriving 4 October 1943.

On 17 October, after having her boilers cleaned at Aden, Battler joined Convoy AB 17, along with Rotherham, Quiberon, and Quality for escort to Bombay. She arrived on 26 October, and left 4 November, along with Quiberon and Quality to rendezvous with the LST Convoy AB 18A for escort to Bombay. She provided A/S cover from 7 to 9 November. On 11 November, Battler, Napier, Rotherham, and Nepal left Bombay to rendezvous with Convoy AB 20 for escort to Bombay. She again provided A/S coverage from 14 to 17 November.

On 12 December, she set out with Rotherham, Nepal, and Plym to meet Convoy AB 24 on 15 December. Battler and part of the convoy, after having split into three sections, arrived in Bombay, on 19 December. She finished off her Indian Ocean escorts with Convoy AB 27A, leaving Bombay on 26 December, with Rotherham, Roebuck, Rapid, Kale, and Derg to rendezvous on 11 January, for escort back to Bombay.

==== Operations Thwart and Covered ====
Battler joined the cruisers Kenya, Newcastle, and Suffolk, the armed merchant cruiser Canton, the destroyer Nepal, and the frigate Bann to form Force 62 for Operation Thwart. The purpose of the operation was to search for the blockade runner, U-boat supply ship Charlotte Schliemann, southeast of Mauritius. With the main force sailing from Colombo on 12 January, Battler joined them at Mauritius on 16 January. The force searched from 19 to 21 January, then a smaller force, named Force 64, consisting of Battler, Kenya, and Nepal, searching from 23 to 30 January, further southeast of Mauritius. The operation was called off on 30 January, after adverse weather set in and fruitless searching turned up nothing.

On 4 February, Battler and Suffolk arrived at Durban, South Africa. She returned to Mauritius, in early March, to search for another blockade runner, the U-boat supply ship Brake, during Operation Covered. On 12 March, after seven days of searching, a Swordfish of 834 squadron, spotted the tanker Brake with two or three U-boats alongside her, 900 nmi (1,700 km; 1,000 mi) southeast of Mauritius. Battler launched Swordfish armed with rockets to shadow Brake in an attempt not to alert the tanker to the carriers presence, while Roebuck moved in for an attack. At noon, Roebuck commenced her attack on Brake forcing her crew to scuttle her, while the Swordfish damaged one of the U-boats. On 16 March, the group arrived in Mauritius, with Battler proceeding to Durban, for refit, arriving 21 March 1944.

==== Convoy and A/S duty ====
Embarking only the Swordfish of 834 squadron on 24 June 1944, after completion of her refit, Battler sailed north with Convoy CM 55, from Durban to Kilindini, on 28 June. She escorted Convoy KR 11 from Kilindini to Colombo, on 11 July, arriving on 22 July. She disembarked 834 squadron at RNAS Katukurunda on 25 July, where six Wildcat Vs were waiting to replace the Seafires that had been left at Durban.

On August 11, 1944, 834 squadron embarked on Battler and carried out A/S patrols near Colombo. On 22 August, she set off for Addu Atoll, in the Maldive Islands, to carry out more A/S patrols. On 19 September, 834 squadron disembarked at RNAS Coimbatore, for replacement aircraft, returning to Battler on 28 September. On 7 October, Battler disembarked 834 squadron at Trincomalee. During her time at Trincomalee, 849 squadrons Avengers performed Deck Landing Training.

==== Ferry duty ====
Battler was redesignated as a "Ferry Carrier" at the beginning of November. On 7 November 1944, she embarked 834 squadron to be ferried back to the UK. She meet up with Thane and the two ships arrived at Adabiya, on 21 November. With her orders changed, Battler unloaded 834 squadron while Thane unloaded the Avenger and Hellcat aircraft that were to be embarked in Battler for transport to Sydney, Australia. She would still return to the UK, but it would be via Australia and the Panama Canal.

After returning to Colombo, to prepare for her ferry run to Sydney, she departed on 9 December 1944, with the carrier Atheling, the cruiser Achilles, and the destroyers Wager and Whelp, for Australia. They were joined on 10 December, by the ships Swiftsure, the flagship of Fourth Cruiser Squadron commander Rear Admiral E.J.P. Brind, and the destroyers Kempenfelt, Wessex, and Wakeful. On 11 December, most of the destroyers broke from the convoy and returned to Trincomalee, while Swiftsure and Achilles departed on 16 December, to continue ahead for Fremantle.

After unloading her aircraft in Sydney, Battler loaded stores and equipment bound for the UK. She arrived in Bilbao, on 1 February 1945, and Norfolk, Virginia, on 3 February. Embarking aircraft at Naval Station Norfolk, she sailed for New York on 13 February, to join Convoy CU 59. CU 59 departed New York, on 19 February, and arrived on 1 March, at Liverpool.

=== North Atlantic ===
==== Deck landing training ====
On 5 March 1945, Battler was allocated to Western Approaches Command for use as a Deck Landing Training carrier. For her new role Battler received modification in Belfast. On 5 May 1945, she began practice with 768 squadron in the Firth of Clyde. On 4 June, she was allocated to Rosyth Command in the same role, but shifting to the Firth of Forth with 768 squadron. In October, she began training 731 and 767 squadrons until 8 January 1946, when she was sent to Greenock, for decommissioning.

== Decommissioning ==
On 19 January, Battler sailed from the Clyde, for Norfolk, Virginia, arriving 31 January. She was decommissioned at Norfolk, on 12 February, and returned to USN custody. Deemed "not essential to the defense of the United States", on 6 March, she was struck from the Naval Vessel Register on 28 March. She was sold on 14 May, to the Patapsco Steel Scrap Co., Bethlehem, Pennsylvania, and delivered on 12 June 1946, and was subsequently scrapped.

== FAA squadrons ==
Fleet Air Arm Squadrons stationed on Battler
Squadron	Dates	Aircraft type
840	December 1942	Fairey Swordfish Mks.I/II
835	April 1943 – July 1943	Fairey Swordfish Mk.II
808	April 1943 - September 1943	Supermarine Seafire LF.IIc
807	August 1943 - October 1943	Supermarine Seafire LF.IIc
834	September 1943 - October 1944	Supermarine Seafire LF.IIc/Grumman Wildcat Mk.V/Fairey Swordfish

== Bibliography ==
- Cocker, Maurice (2008). Aircraft-Carrying Ships of the Royal Navy. Stroud, Gloucestershire: The History Press. ISBN 978-0-7524-4633-2.
- Hobbs, David (1996). Aircraft Carriers of the Royal and Commonwealth Navies. London: Greenhill Books. ISBN 1-85367-252-1.
- Jackson, Ashley (2006). The British Empire and the Second World War. London: Hambledon Continuum. ISBN 1-85285-417-0.
- Poolman, Kenneth (1972). Escort Carrier 1941–1945. London: Ian Allan. ISBN 0-7110-0273-8.
- Sturtivant, Ray; Ballance, Theo (1994). The Squadrons of the Fleet Air Arm. Tonbridge, UK: Air Britain (Historians) Ltd. ISBN 0-85130-223-8.
- Morison, Samuel (2002). History of United States Naval Operations in World War II. Urbana, Illinois: University of Illinois Press. ISBN 978-0-252-07062-4.
- "Mormacmail'". United States Maritime Commission.
- "Altamaha I (AVG-6)". Dictionary of American Naval Fighting Ships. Naval History and Heritage Command. 7 April 2020. This article incorporates text from this source, which is in the public domain.
- "Battler". Dictionary of American Naval Fighting Ships. Naval History and Heritage Command. 24 June 2015. This article incorporates text from this source, which is in the public domain.
- "A History of HMS Battler". Royal Navy Research Archive. 11 June 2020.
