= Peewit =

Peewit may refer to:

- Magpie-lark, a species of bird found in Australia and southern New Guinea
- Northern lapwing, a species of bird found in Eurasia and northern Africa
- Peewit, a fictional dwarf in the Belgian comics series Johan and Peewit
- RNAS East Haven, also known as HMS Peewit
