= East Haven, Angus =

Coordinates: 56.516503°N 2.667081°W

East Haven
- Location within Angus
- OS grid reference: NO590362
- Council area: Angus
- Lieutenancy area: Angus
- Country: Scotland
- Sovereign state: United Kingdom
- Post town: CARNOUSTIE
- Postcode district: DD7
- Dialling code: 01241
- Police: Scotland
- Fire: Scottish
- Ambulance: Scottish
- UK Parliament: Dundee East
- Scottish Parliament: Angus South

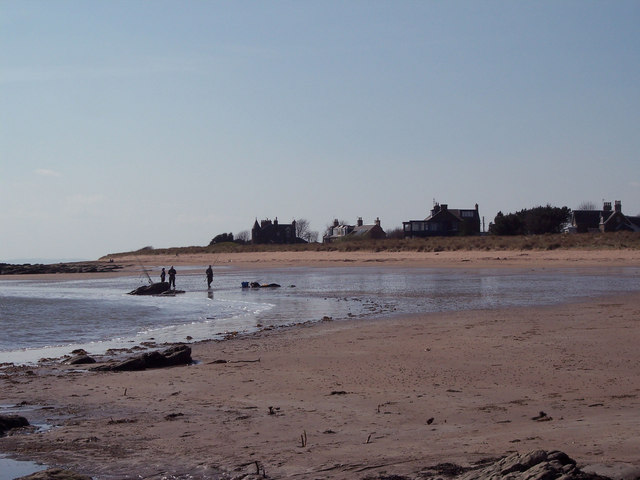
The beach at East Haven

East Haven is a fishing village in the council area of Angus, Scotland. It is situated 1.5 miles (2 km) east of Carnoustie and 5 miles (8 km) south west of Arbroath. The closest city, Dundee, is 13 miles (21 km) to the west.

East Haven has a long history and is first recorded (as 'Stinchendehavene') in deeds granted in 1214 by Philip de Valognes, Lord of Panmure, to the Cistercian monks of Coupar Angus, which gave them rights to build on the land there, to use the haven and to impose a toll on the fishings. East Haven can be seen on Pont's map of Lower Angus, c1583-96., spelled 'East Heaven'. It has been known under various other names including 'Ross Haven', 'Mauleshaven' and 'Stinking Haven'. Formerly, a small fishing fleet operated from the natural harbour, catching cod and haddock which were sold in markets in Dundee and Forfar, as well as lobsters for export to London and crabs for local use.

The beach at East Haven is popular with families from the local area during summer months, and the royal family were regular visitors while holidaying at Glamis in the 1930s.

Several of the houses are situated only a few feet from the beach, a rocky and often windy sweep of sand typical of Scotland's rugged coastline, and so are popular both as permanent residences or summer houses.

In 1838, construction of the Dundee and Arbroath Railway was completed, its route cutting through the village. East Haven was formerly served by a small railway station which closed in 1967. Twenty houses lie on land on the seaward side of the railway. These were formerly served by a private level crossing which was closed in 2003, leaving them inaccessible by vehicles larger than a car.

The village is on land owned by a limited company originally set up by a group of individuals who own the line of bigger houses to the west. The path that runs to the east is on top of sea defences that are formed from the stone recovered when the nearby Panmure Estate Mansion was demolished.

The former RNAS East Haven (HMS Peewit) is nearby.

The village's bus service, the 73A between Arbroath and Dundee's Ninewells Hospital, run by Stagecoach, was withdrawn in June 2020.

== Fishing ==
The Annual Reports of the Fishery Board for Scotland provide an insight into fishing in Easthaven in the years before the First World War. In the report for 1909 it was stated that the fishing in Easthaven and Westhaven was "unimportant. Fishermen [were] chiefly employed in salmon and crab fishings.

Fishery Statistics

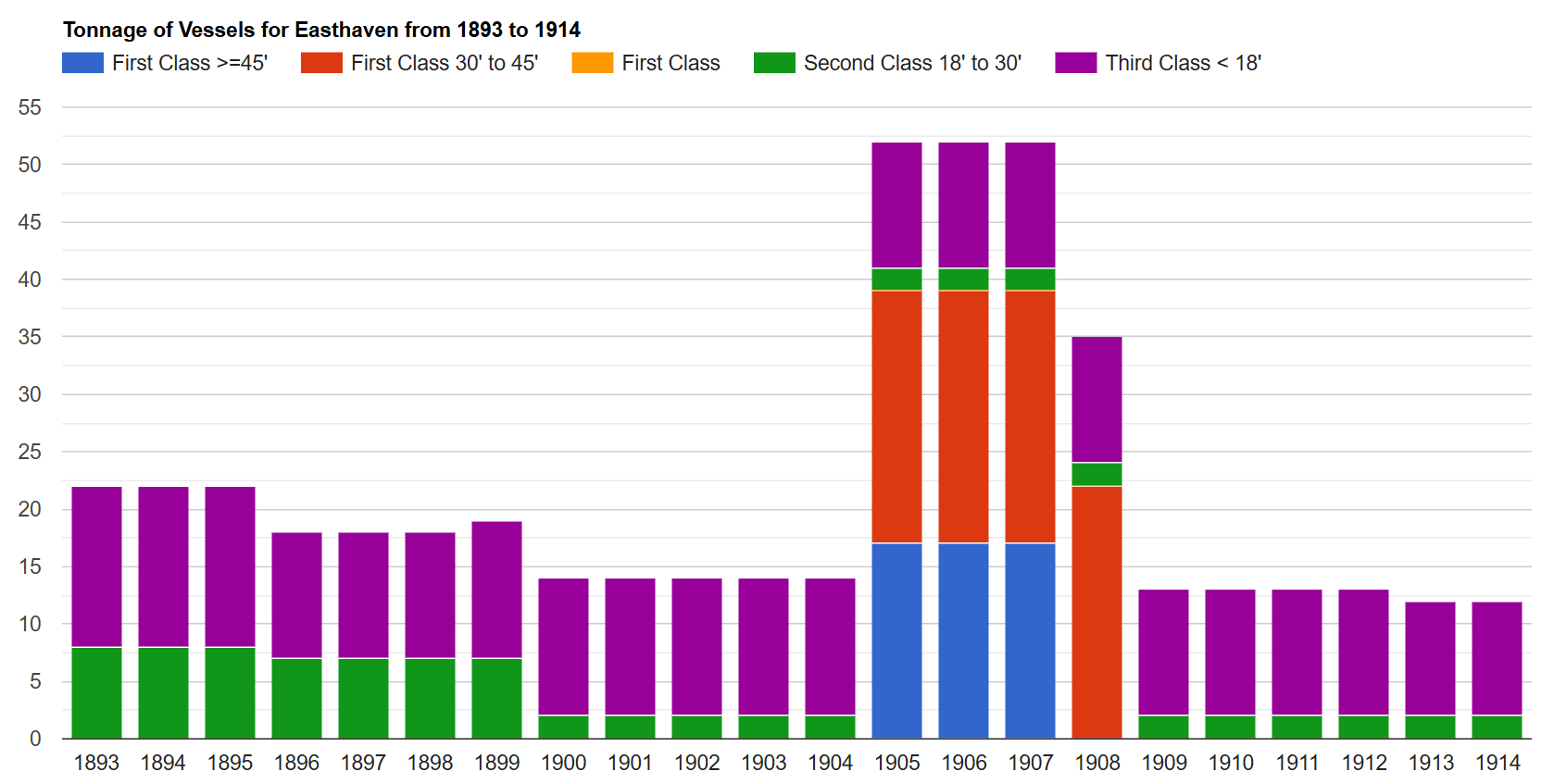
Tonnage of vessels

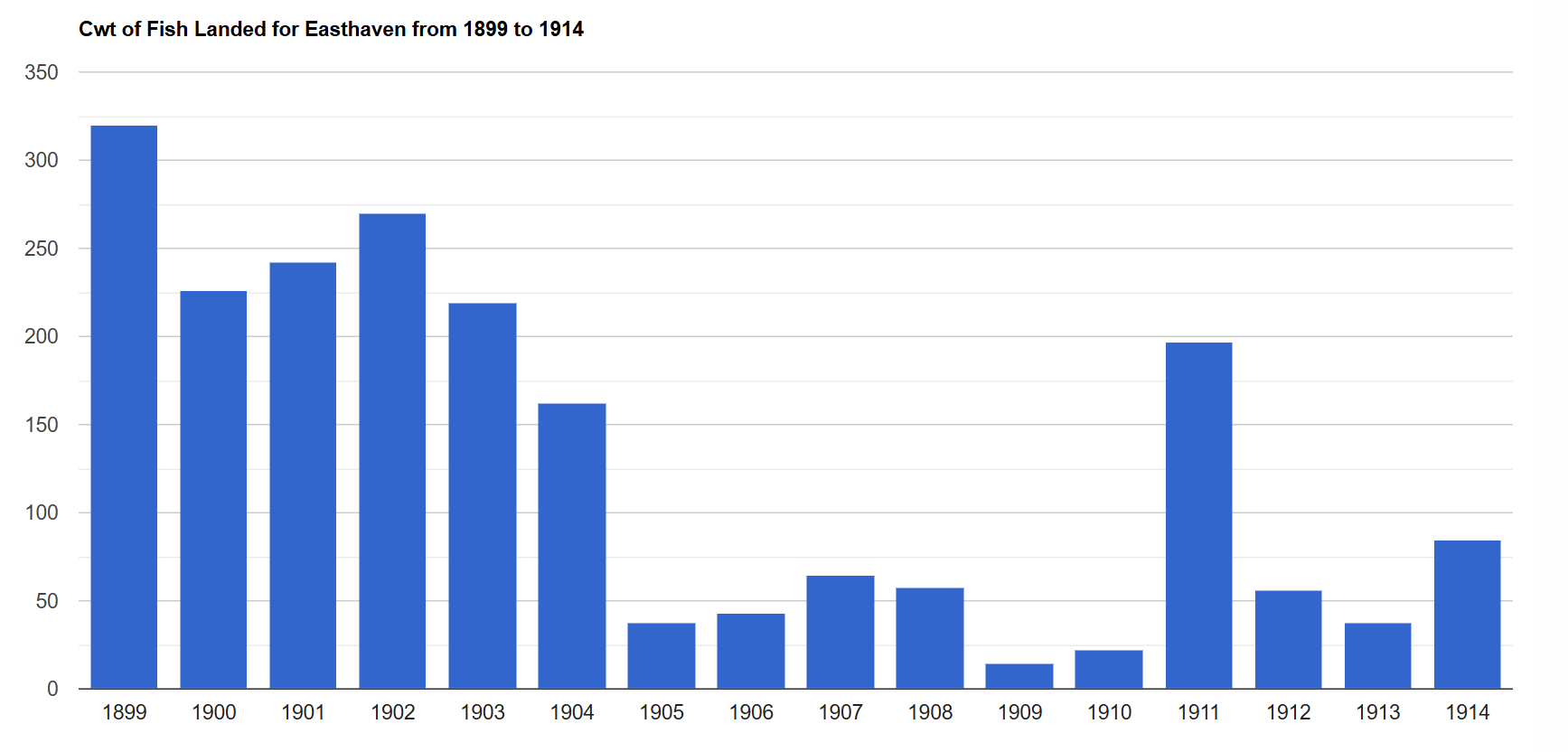
Cwt of fish landed

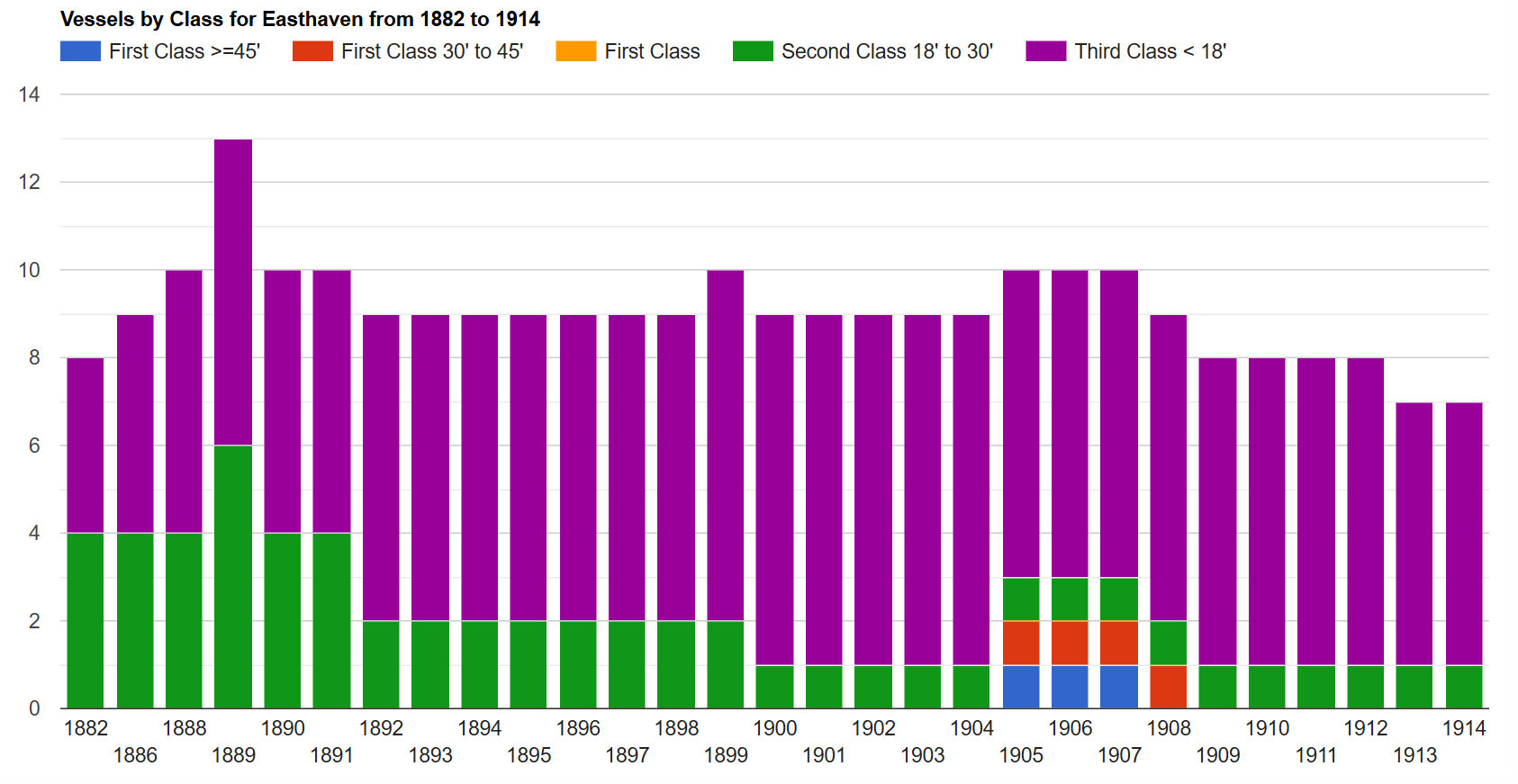
Vessels by class

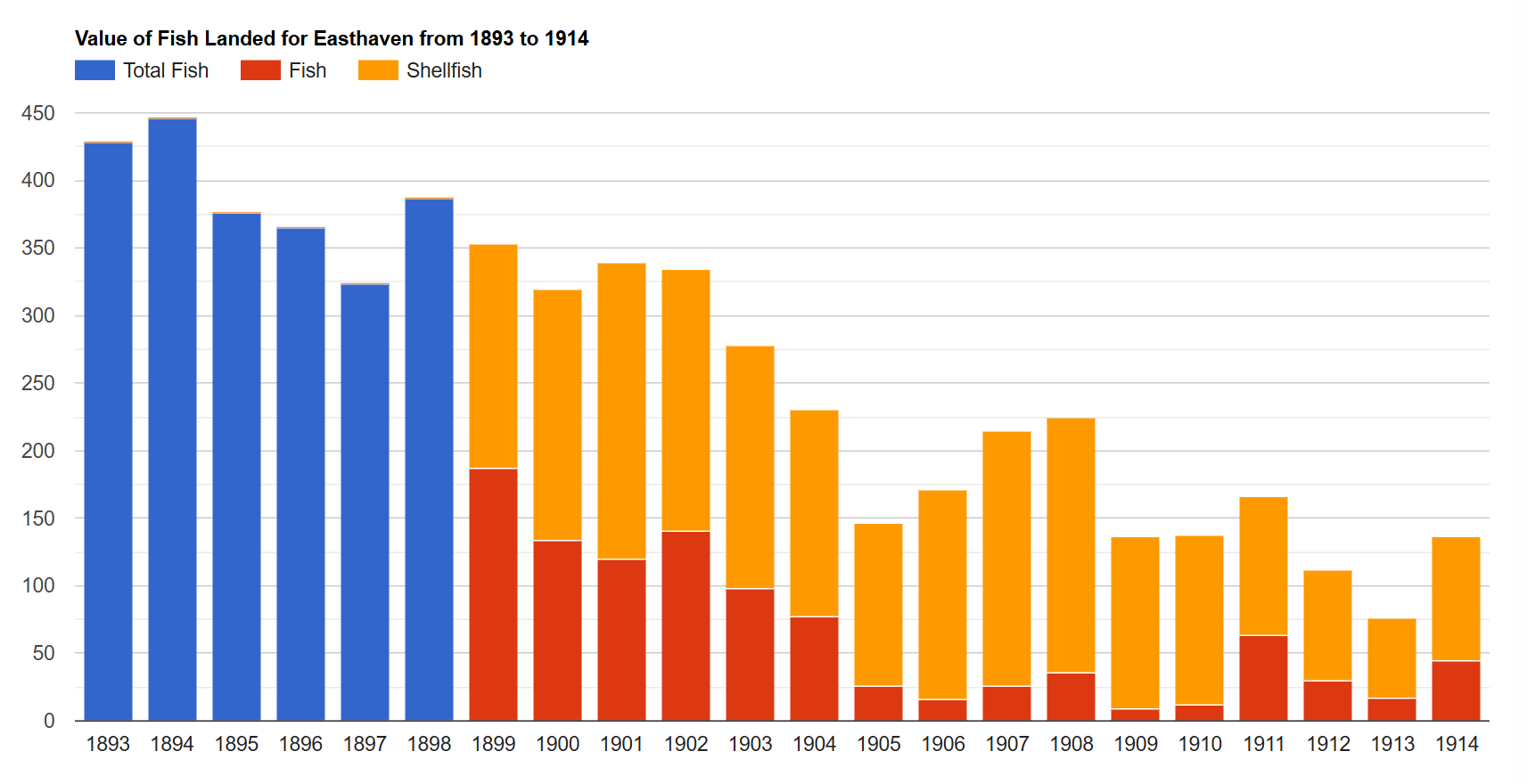
Value (£) of fish landed

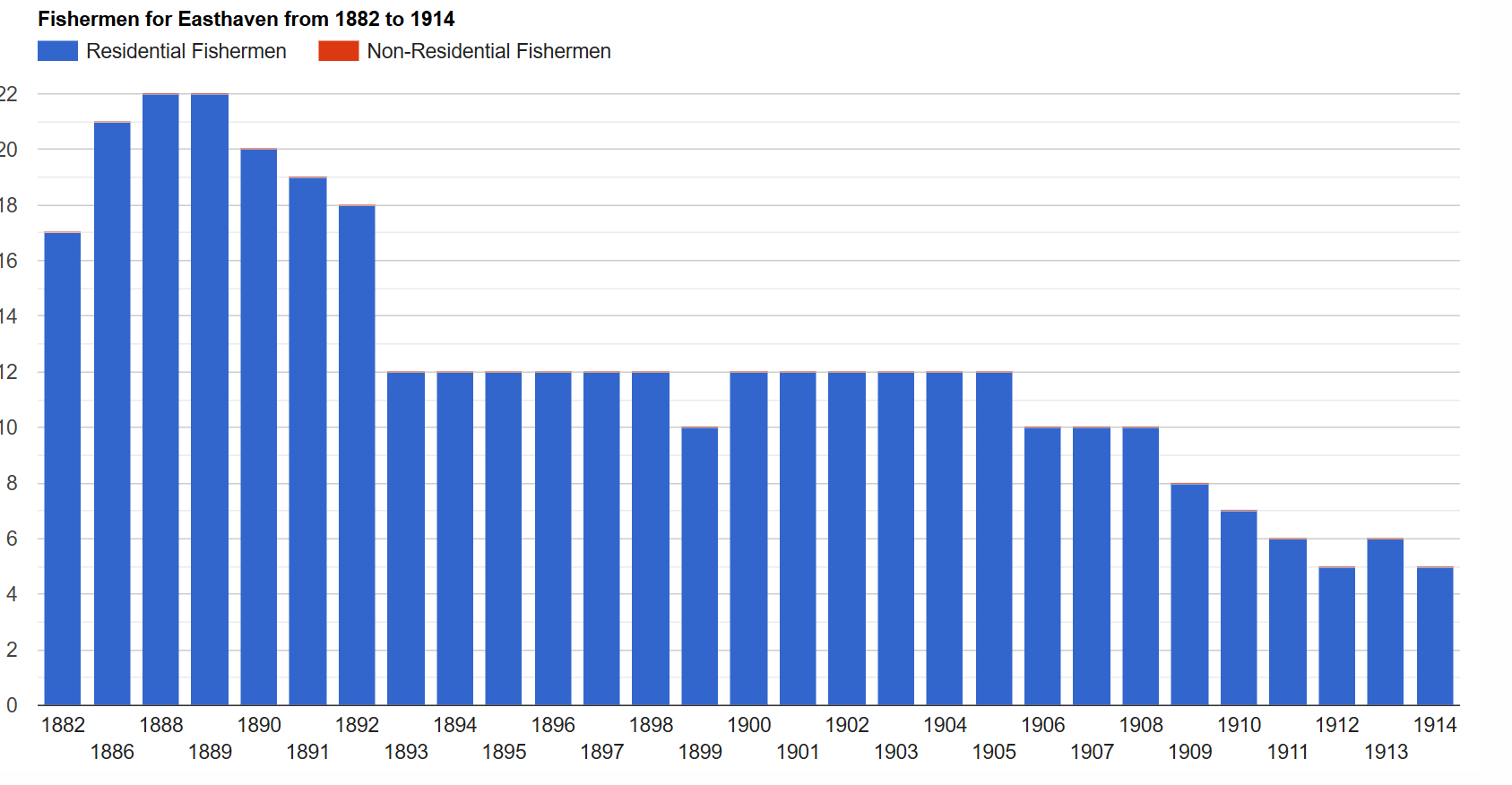
Fishermen

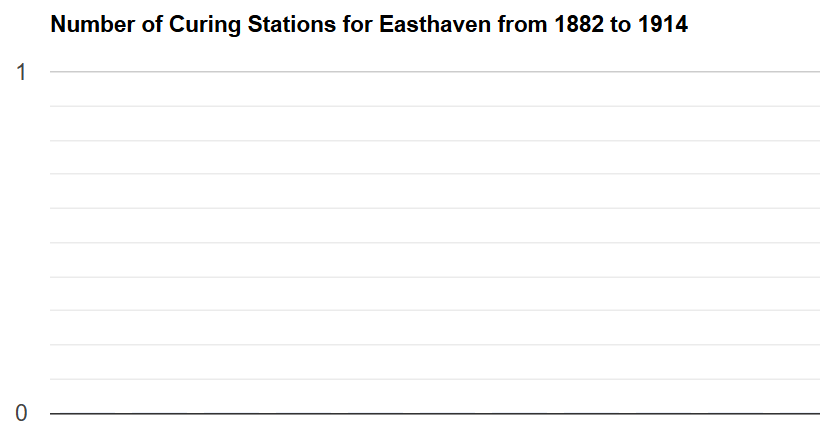
Placeholder - no curing stations

== See also ==
Carnoustie
