= 767 Naval Air Squadron =

Inactive flying squadron of the Royal Navy's Fleet Air Arm

- Squadron badge
- Active: 1939–1940; 1940–1954; 1954–1955; 1956–1957; 1969–1972
- Disbanded: 1 August 1972
- Country: United Kingdom
- Branch: Royal Navy
- Type: Fleet Air Arm Second Line Squadron
- Role: Deck Landing Training Squadron; Deck Landing Control Officer Training Squadron; Landing Signal Officers Training Squadron; Fighter Pilot Pool; Operational Conversion Unit
- Size: Squadron
- Part of: Fleet Air Arm: 50th Training Air Group (May 1948 - January 1952)
- Home station: See Naval air stations section for full list.
- Mottos: Cum dilgentia salus (Latin for 'Safety with diligence')
- Aircraft: See Aircraft operated section for full list.
- Battle honours: Mediterranean, 1940

Insignia
- Squadron Badge Description: Blue, a hawk wings elevated and addorsed proper alighting on a lure gold (1949)
- Identification Markings: T4A+ & T0A+ (Swordfish, 1939-1940); T4A+ (from July 1940); E1A+ & E2A+ (all types, May 1943); IT1A+ & IT2A+ (all types, July 1946); 100-154 (Seafire), 201-244 (Firefly), (from 1947); 200-206 (Firefly, from September 1949); 160-169 (Sea Fury), 171-173 (Attacker) & 260-263 (Firefly) (from September 1952); 120-128 (Sea Hawk), 161-163 (Sea Fury), 171-176 (Attacker), 260-264 (Firefly) & 361-365 (Avenger) (from 1953); 704-715 (Sea Hawk) (from March 1956); 150-160 (Phantom)
- Fin Shore Codes: MV:VL & VL (1947); VL (from September 1949); HR (from January 1952); JA (from September 1952); ST (from 1953); FD (from March 1956); VL (Phantom)

767 Naval Air Squadron (767 NAS), also known as 767 Squadron, is an inactive Fleet Air Arm (FAA) naval air squadron of the United Kingdom's Royal Navy (RN). It most recently operated the McDonnell Douglas Phantom FG.1, as the Operational Conversion Unit (OCU) operating from RNAS Yeovilton, Somerset, between 1969 and 1972.

It was initially formed as a Deck Landing Training Squadron in 1939, when 811 Naval Air Squadron was renumbered 767 Naval Air Squadron, at HMS Merlin, RNAS Donibristle. A detachment went to Hyeres de la Palyvestre in the south of France, enabling training in fairer conditions. While here, the squadron took on an operational mission, with a bombing attack on the Italian port of Genoa. With the fall of France the squadron evacuated to French Algeria, where it split. Part went to Malta, forming 830 Naval Air Squadron, the other part to HMS Ark Royal, with personnel returning to the UK via Gibraltar. The squadron regrouped at HMS Condor, RNAS Arbroath, Angus and moved to the Deck Landing School at HMS Peewit at RNAS East Haven, Angus, in 1943.

The squadron moved to RNAS Lossiemouth, Moray in 1946 where it provided its training, operating out of the satellite airfield at HMS Fulmar at RNAS Milltown. It then moved to RNAS Yeovilton three years later in 1949, where its role became Deck Landing Control Officer Training Squadron. It continued in this role, moving on to RNAS Henstridge, Somerset, in 1952. Later the same year it moved to RNAS Stretton, Cheshire and a change in technology, the introduction of an optical landing system, meant a change in role to a Landing Signal Officers Training Squadron, eventually disbanding in 1955.

It reformed in 1956 as a Fighter Pilot Pool squadron at RNAS Ford, West Sussex, moving to HMS Goldcrest, (RNAS Brawdy), later in the year. However, a month later it was back at RNAS Ford, but was disbanded in April 1957.

== History ==
=== Deck Landing Training Squadron (1939-1949) ===
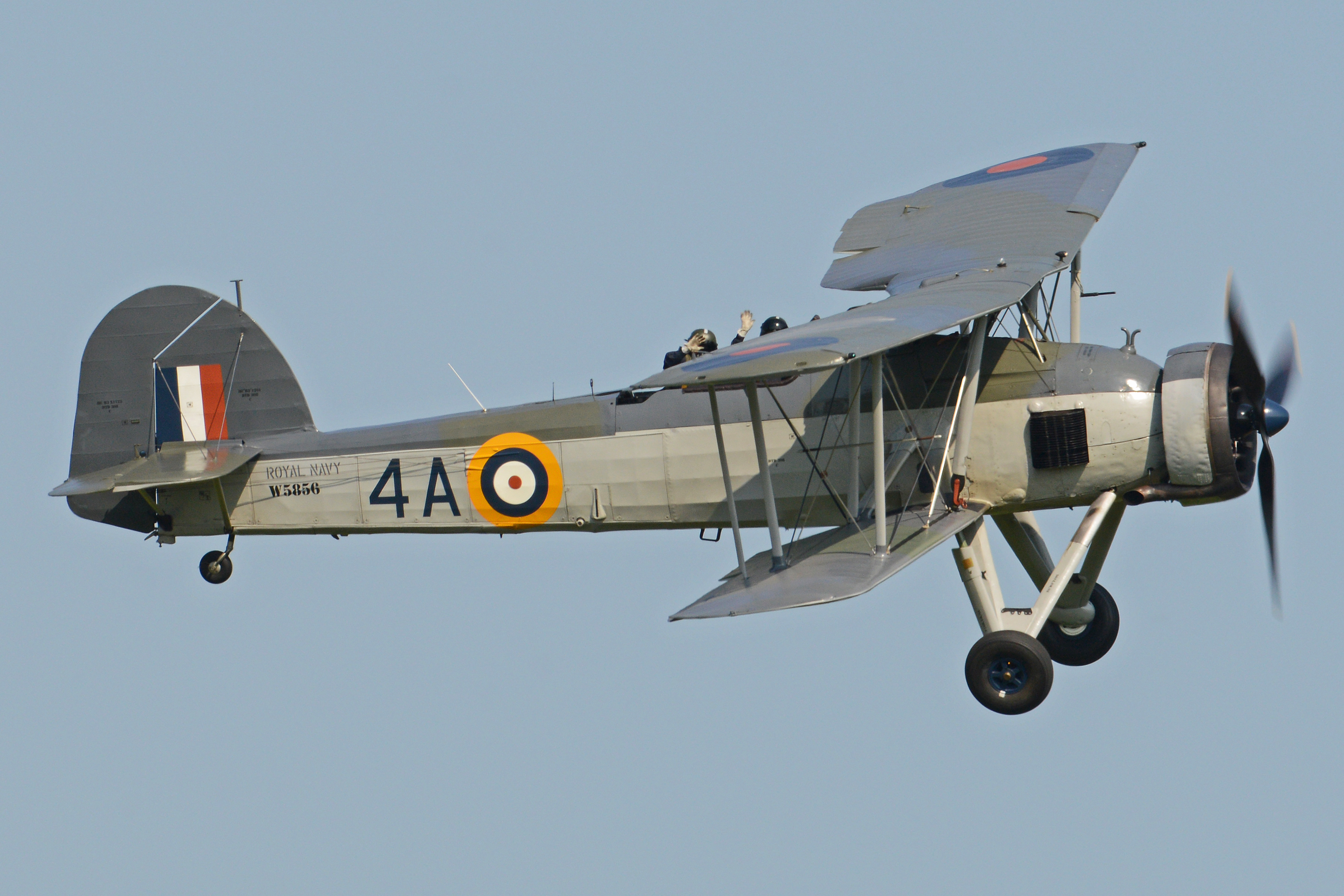
Fairey Swordfish I were used by 767 NAS

767 Naval Air Squadron formed as a Deck Landing Training Squadron, by redesignating 811 Naval Air Squadron, at RNAS Donibristle (HMS Merlin), located 2.7 miles (4.3 km) east of Rosyth in Fife, Scotland, on the 24 May 1939. It was initially equipped with DH.60 Moth, a two-seat touring and training biplane, Fairey Swordfish, a biplane torpedo bomber and Blackburn Shark, a carrier-borne biplane torpedo bomber. Basic training was carried out at RNAS Donibristle, however, advanced training was carried out on the aircraft carrier, HMS Furious.

The squadron sent a detachment to Hyeres de la Palyvestre, a French Naval air station located near Toulon, in Provence, France, in November 1939, to enable shore based training in the more favourable Mediterranean weather conditions. Here, HMS Argus, one of the Royal Navy's oldest aircraft carriers, served as a training ship for carrier deck-landing training.

On the 13 June 1940, the squadron was involved in a bombing raid on the Italian port of Genoa just days after Italy entered World War II. This action involved nine aircraft from 767 NAS. Due to poor moonlight on the night, the attempt was abandoned, however, the following night of the 14 June, a successful attack was made.

With the French falling to the German invasion, the squadron needed to be evacuated from France. Eighteen aircraft flew to Bône in Algeria, using Bône Airfield. Here the squadron separated into two parts, with twelve aircraft going to RAF Hal Far, on the island of Malta, which then formed 830 Naval Air Squadron, in July 1940. The other six going on to the Royal Navy aircraft carrier HMS Ark Royal, with the aircraft being absorbed into its squadrons, and 767 Naval Air Squadron personnel going to the UK via Gibraltar.

767 Naval Air Squadron regrouped at RNAS Arbroath (HMS Condor), located near Arbroath in East Angus, Scotland, on the 8 July 1940, continuing as a Deck Landing Training Squadron, now as part of the Deck Landing Training (DLT) School. It was initially equipped with Fairey Albacore and Fairey Swordfish, both biplane torpedo bomber aircraft. In September 1940, the squadron received Fairey Fulmar, a carrier-borne, reconnaissance / fighter aircraft, these remained on strength for around one year before being withdrawn in the following October, in 1941. It also operated Percival Proctor, a radio trainer and communications aircraft, between June and August of that year. In the November, it received Grumman Martlet, an American carrier-based fighter aircraft, however, these were withdrawn from use in 1942. The squadron operated out of Arbroath for almost two years, then on the 5 May 1943, it relocated to RNAS East Haven (HMS Peewit), located approximately 1.5 miles (2 km) east of Carnoustie and 5 miles (8 km) south west of Arbroath.

RNAS East Haven was home to the Deck Landing Training School and Deck Landing Control Officer Training School. 767 Naval Air Squadron was joined by 768 Deck Landing Training Squadron, in October 1943 and 731 Deck Landing Control Officer Training Squadron, in December 1943. Around this time the squadron received a later variant of Fairey Fulmar aircraft and the Fairey Albacore were withdrawn. However, in 1944, the Fulmar were withdrawn from use and these were replaced with Fairey Barracuda a carrier-borne torpedo and dive bomber aircraft. The remaining Fairey Swordfish aircraft were also withdrawn during 1944. The next year saw the arrival of Fairey Firefly aircraft to the squadron. Supermarine Seafire aircraft were received in early 1946. On the 15 July 1946, 767 NAS moved to RNAS Milltown (HMS Fulmar II), located south of the Moray Firth and 3.6 miles (5.8 km) north east of Elgin, Scotland.

=== Deck Landing Control Officer Training Squadron (1949-1953) ===
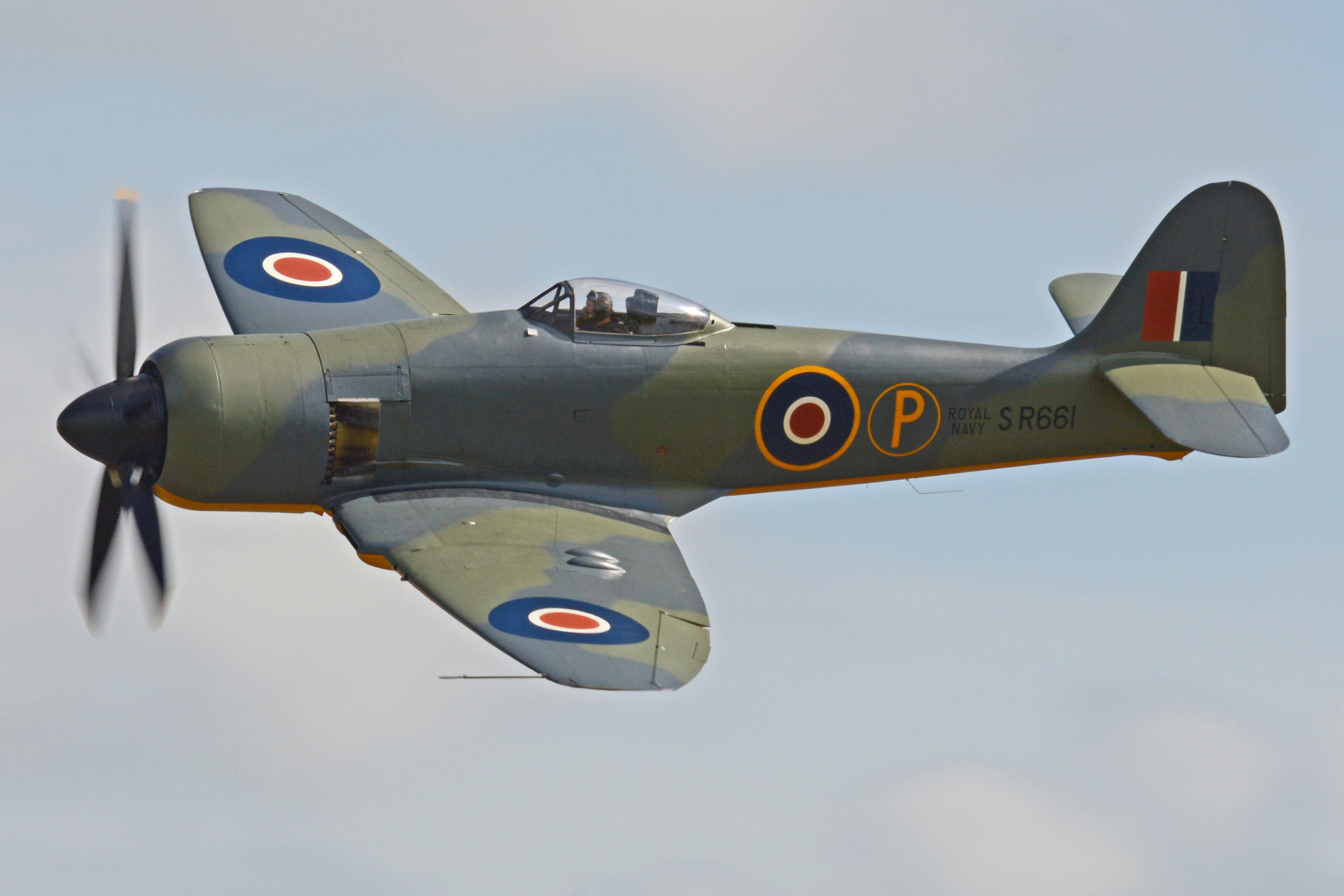
Hawker Sea Fury FB.11, the type used by 767 NAS for DLCO training

The squadron moved to RNAS Yeovilton (HMS Heron), situated 4.2 miles (7 kilometres) north of the town of Yeovil, in Somerset, England, on the 8 September 1949. Here it provided Deck Landing Control Officer training and being administered as part of the 50th Training Air Group.

The aircraft flew continuous circuits and approaches to land on whichever runway was in use, enabling the prospective DLCOs to direct their approach. The runway in use was known as the 'Dummy Deck', the trainee DLCOs were known as 'Batsmen' and the repetitive work earned them the nickname ‘Clockwork Mice’. The training course ended with the trainees operating on whichever aircraft carrier was assigned as a Deck Landing Training (DLT) Carrier.

On the 4 January 1952 the squadron moved to RNAS Henstridge (HMS Dipper), situated 12.4 miles (20 km) east of Yeovil in Somerset, England, where the DLCO training continued. Here the Hawker Sea Fury, a fighter aircraft and Fairey Firefly carrier-borne fighter aircraft and anti-submarine aircraft, were the main aircraft used. 767 NAS only remained at RNAS Henstridge for a further eight months, before moving, on the 20 September 1952, to RNAS Stretton (HMS Blackcap), an airfield at Appleton Thorn in Cheshire, situated 3 miles (5 kilometres) South East of Warrington.

=== Landing Signal Officers Training Squadron (1953-1955) ===
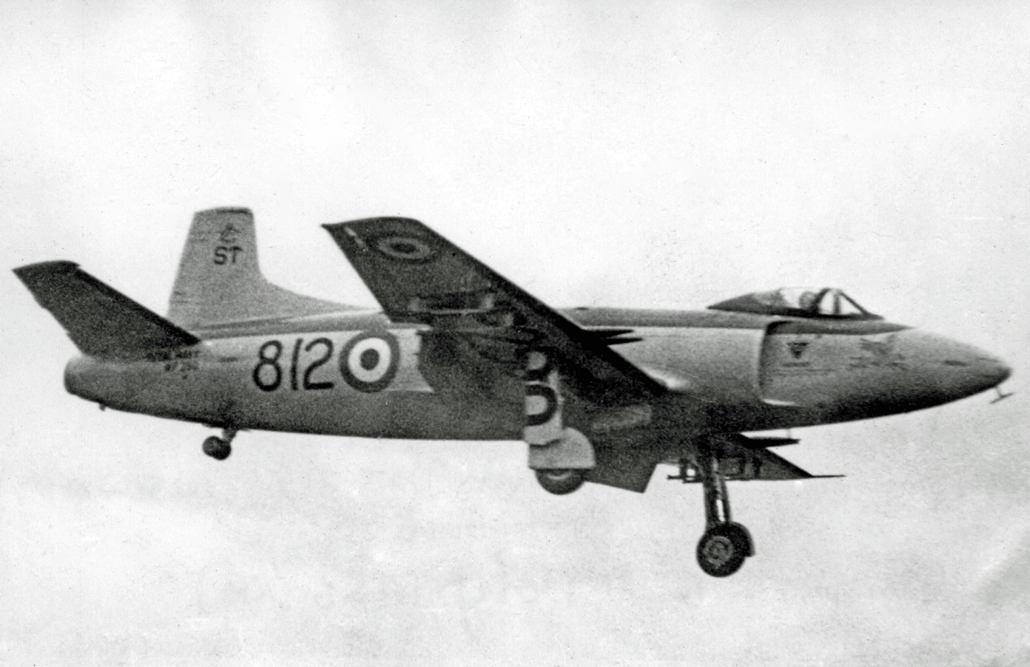
767 NAS at Stretton used Supermarine Attacker FB.2, similar to this one of 812 NAS

In 1953 the squadron received Supermarine Attacker, a single-seat naval jet fighter aircraft, and in the October of that year, with the introduction of the Mirror Landing Aid, used to give glidepath information to pilots in the terminal phase of landing on an aircraft carrier, 767 NAS became the Landing Signal Officers Training Squadron. In 1954, the squadron disbanded on the 15 May, but it then reformed on the 20 September and was equipped with Grumman Avenger torpedo bomber and Hawker Sea Hawk single-seat jet day fighter, aircraft. 767 NAS remained at RNAS Stretton for a further six months, however, on the 31 March 1955 the squadron disbanded.

=== Fighter Pilot Pool (1956-1957) ===
767 Naval Air Squadron reformed on the 1 March 1956, as a Fighter Pilot Pool squadron, at RNAS Ford (HMS Peregrine), located at Ford, in West Sussex, England. The squadron was equipped with later variants than previously operated at RNAS Stretton, of Hawker Sea Hawk day fighter aircraft. It remained at RNAS Ford for around five months before moving to RNAS Brawdy (HMS Goldcrest), located 6.3 miles (10.1 km) east of St Davids in Pembrokeshire, Wales, on the 14 August 1956. Here the squadron provided an armament work-up course. However, the following month, on the 20 September, the squadron returned to Ford. Now the squadron was required to train up replacement pilots, needed for FAA squadrons operating in the Suez. 767 Naval Air Squadron disbanded into 764 Naval Air Squadron on the 1 April 1957.

=== Operational Conversion Unit (1969-1972) ===
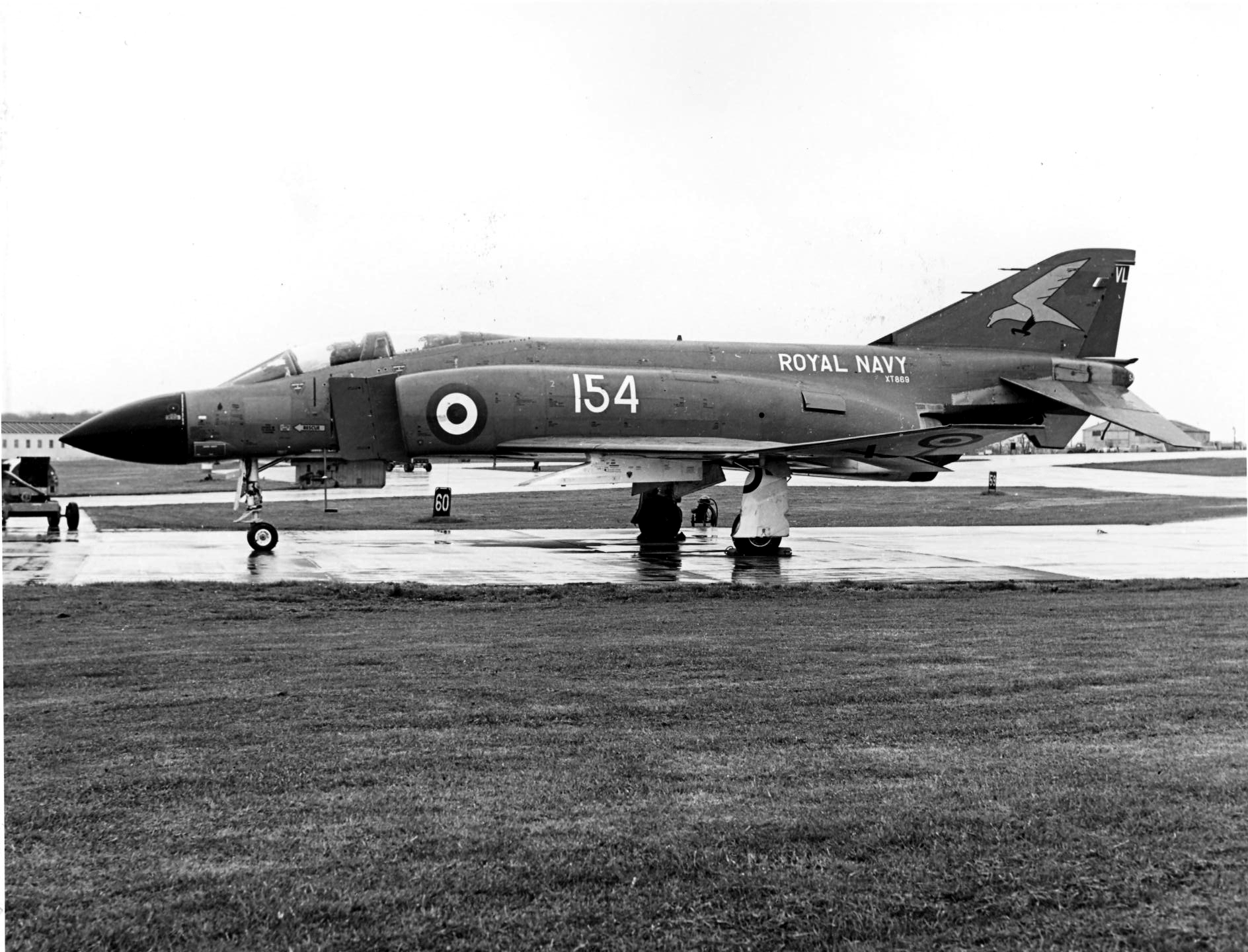
Phantom FG.1 of 767 Naval Air Squadron parked

767 Naval Air Squadron reformed on the 14 January 1969, at RNAS Yeovilton (HMS Heron), as an Operational Conversion Unit (OCU), from the core of 700P Naval Air Squadron. Its role was to convert Royal Navy Fleet Air Arm aircrew and Royal Air Force aircrew, to the McDonnell Douglas F-4K Phantom II ( British designation Phantom FG.1), an American two-seat, twin-engine, all-weather, long-range supersonic jet interceptor and fighter-bomber aircraft, purchased for the Royal Navy, as a carrier-borne fighter for fleet defence, to replace the de Havilland Sea Vixen air-defence fighter aircraft. 767 Naval Air Squadron disbanded as an OCU at Yeovilton, once its task was completed, on the 1 August 1972.

== Aircraft operated ==
767 Naval Air Squadron has operated a number of different aircraft types, including:

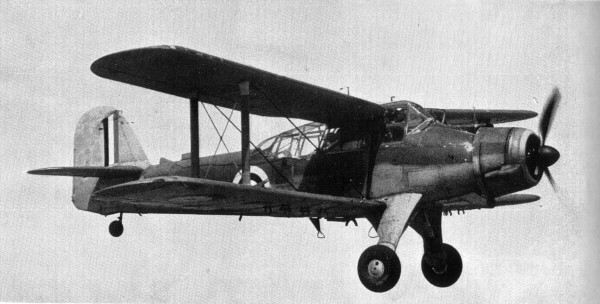
Fairey Albacore

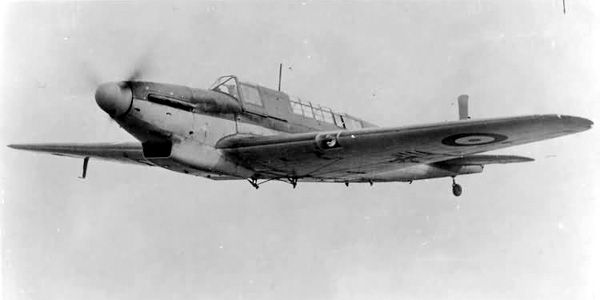
Fairey Fulmar Mk.I

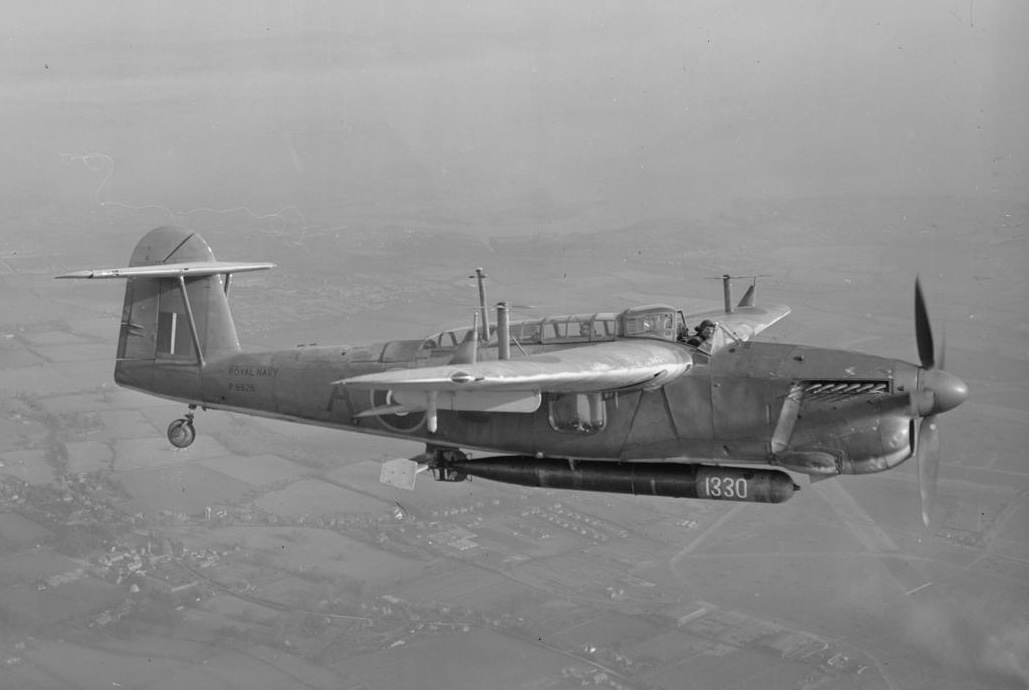
Fairey Barracuda Mk II

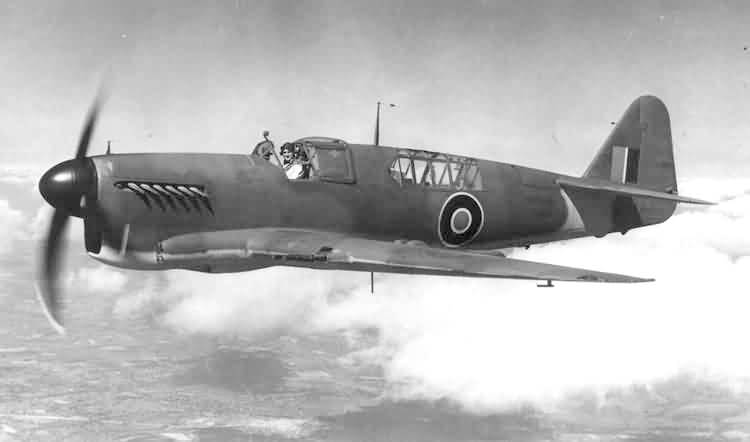
Fairey Firefly

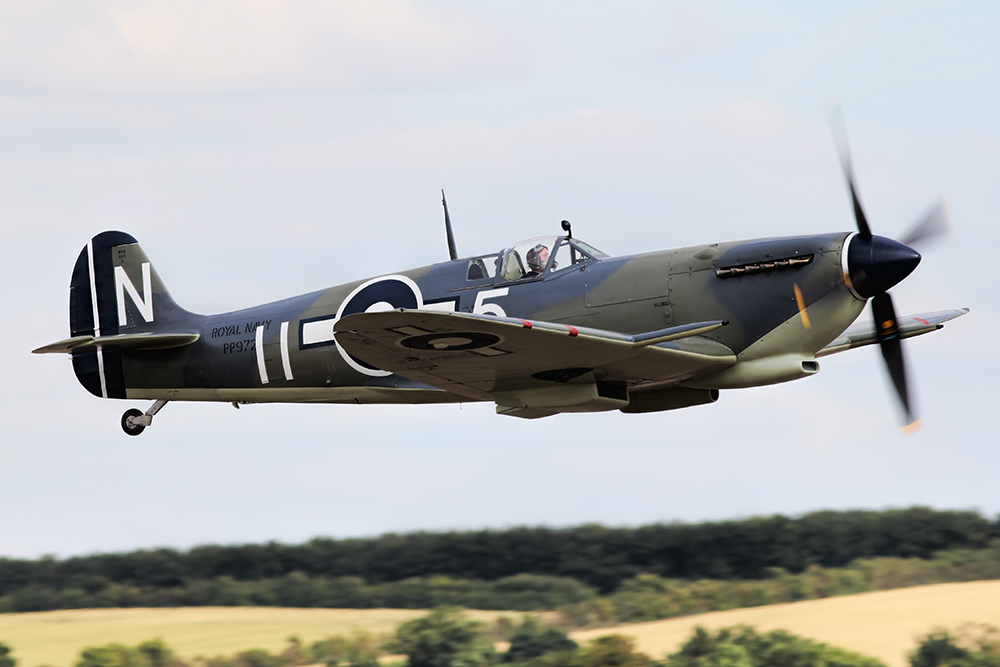
Supermarine Seafire L Mk III

- Blackburn Shark Mk III torpedo bomber (May 1939 - July 1939)
- de Havilland DH.60M Moth (Metal Moth) trainer aircraft (May 1939 - July 1940)
- Fairey Swordfish I torpedo bomber (May 1939 - July 1944)
- Blackburn Shark Mk I torpedo bomber (June 1939 - July 1939)
- de Havilland DH.60X Moth trainer aircraft (December 1939 - July 1940)
- Fairey Albacore torpedo bomber (February 1940 - December 1943)
- Fairey Fulmar Mk.I reconnaissance/fighter aircraft (September 1940 - October 1941)
- Percival Proctor IA radio trainer and communications aircraft (April 1940, June 1941 - August 1941)
- Grumman Martlet Mk I fighter aircraft (November 1941 - 1942)
- Fairey Swordfish II torpedo bomber (January 1943 - May 1944)
- Fairey Fulmar Mk.II reconnaissance/fighter aircraft (November 1943 - February 1944)
- Fairey Barracuda Mk II torpedo and dive bomber (May 1944 - July 1946)
- Fairey Barracuda Mk I torpedo and dive bomber (June 1944 - August 1946)
- Fairey Firefly FR.I fighter/reconnaissance aircraft (September 1945 - March 1953)
- Supermarine Seafire L Mk III fighter aircraft (March 1946 - June 1947)
- Supermarine Seafire F Mk XV fighter aircraft (May 1946 - February 1952)
- Fairey Firefly T.Mk I trainer aircraft (April 1948 - June 1953)
- North American Harvard III advanced trainer aircraft (August 1948 - July 1950)
- North American Harvard IIB advanced trainer aircraft (March 1949 - July 1950)
- Fairey Firefly FR.Mk 4 fighter/reconnaissance aircraft (October 1949 - May 1954)
- Hawker Sea Fury FB.II fighter bomber aircraft (November 1949 - June 1952)
- de Havilland Dominie short-haul airliner (March 1950 - January 1951)
- Supermarine Seafire F Mk 46 fighter aircraft (March 1950 - July 1950)
- Fairey Firefly AS.Mk 6 anti-submarine aircraft (March 1951 - December 1951)
- Hawker Sea Fury F.10 fighter aircraft (March 1951 - June 1953)
- Gloster Meteor T.7 two-seat trainer aircraft (February 1953 - December 1953)
- Supermarine Attacker F.1 jet fighter aircraft (February 1953 - March 1954)
- Supermarine Attacker FB.2 jet fighter-bomber aircraft (July 1953 - March 1954)
- Grumman Avenger torpedo bomber AS4 (September 1954 - March 1955)
- Hawker Sea Hawk F1 jet day fighter (September 1954 - March 1955)
- Hawker Sea Hawk F2 jet day fighter (March 1956 - May 1957)
- Hawker Sea Hawk FB 3 jet fighter-bomber (March 1956 - June 1957)
- McDonnell Douglas F-4K Phantom II FG.1 jet interceptor and fighter-bomber aircraft (January 1969 - July 1972)

== Battle honours ==
The battle honours awarded to 767 Naval Air Squadron are:

- Mediterranean 1940

== Naval air stations and aircraft carriers ==
767 Naval Air Squadron operated from a number of naval air stations of the Royal Navy, both in the UK and overseas, a number of Royal Navy aircraft carriers and other air bases:

1939 - 1940

- Royal Naval Air Station Donibristle (HMS Merlin) (24 May 1939 - 13 November 1939)
  - HMS Furious - (Carrier DLT 8 June to 7 July 1939, 26 September to 9 October 1939)
- HMS Argus (13–21 November 1939)
- Hyeres de la Palyvestre (21 November 1939 - 18 June 1940)
  - HMS Argus - (Carrier DLT 21 November 1939 - 18 June 1940)
- Bône Airfield (19 - 22 June 1940)
- RN Air Section Hal Far - twelve aircraft which formed 830 Naval Air Squadron (22 June - 1 July 1940)
- HMS Ark Royal - six aircraft (20 - 22 June 1940)
- RN Air Section Gibraltar (22 - 25 June 1940)

1940 - 1954

- Royal Naval Air Station Arbroath (HMS Condor) (8 July 1940 - 5 May 1943)
- Royal Naval Air Station East Haven (HMS Peewit) (5 May 1943 - 15 July 1946)
- Royal Naval Air Station Milltown (HMS Fulmar II) (15 July 1946 - 8 September 1949)
- Royal Naval Air Station Yeovilton (HMS Heron) (8 September 1949 - 4 January 1952)
  - Royal Naval Air Station Henstridge (HMS Dipper) (ADDLS 8 September 1949 - 4 January 1952)
- Royal Naval Air Station Henstridge (HMS Dipper) (4 January 1952 - 20 September 1952)
- Royal Naval Air Station Stretton (HMS Blackcap) (20 September 1952 - 15 May 1954)
  - Royal Naval Air Station Yeovilton (HMS Heron) (Detachment seven aircraft 5–12 May 1954)
- disbanded - (15 May 1954)

1954 - 1955

- Royal Naval Air Station Stretton (HMS Stretton) (20 September 1954 - 31 March 1955)
- disbanded - (31 March 1955)

1956 - 1957

- Royal Naval Air Station Ford (HMS Peregrine) (1 March 1956 - 14 August 1956)
- Royal Naval Air Station Brawdy (HMS Goldcrest) (14 August 1956 - 20 September 1956)
- Royal Naval Air Station Ford (HMS Peregrine) (20 September 1956 - 1 April 1957)
  - Royal Naval Air Station Brawdy (HMS Goldcrest) (Detachment five aircraft 2–4 March 1957)
- disbanded - (1 April 1957)

1969 - 1972

- Royal Naval Air Station Yeovilton (HMS Heron) (14 January 1969 - 1 August 1972)
  - Valkenburg (Detachment two aircraft 27–30 September 1969)
  - Landivisiau (Detachment two aircraft 16–21 January 1970)
  - Landivisiau (Detachment two aircraft 13–16 March 1970)
  - Lahr (Detachment three aircraft 24–27 April 1970)
  - Munich (Detachment three aircraft 27–31 August 1970)
  - Værløse (Detachment three aircraft 11–15 November 1970)
  - Capodichino (Detachment three aircraft 11–15 February 1971)
  - Aviano (Detachment four aircraft 2–5 June 1971)
  - Værløse (Detachment three aircraft 28–31 July 1971)
  - RAF Bruggen (Detachment four aircraft 10–13 November 1971)
  - RAF Bruggen (Detachment four aircraft 21–24 June 1971)
  - Leeuwarden (Detachment four aircraft 14–17 April 1972)
- disbanded - (1 August 1972)

== Commanding officers ==
List of commanding officers of 767 Naval Air Squadron, with date of appointment:

1939 - 1940

- Lieutenant Commander E.O.F. Price, RN, from 24 May 1939
- Lieutenant Commander J.A.L. Drummond, RN, from 24 August 1939
- became 830 Naval Air Squadron - 1 July 1940

1940 - 1954

- Lieutenant Commander P.L. Mortimer, RN, from 8 July 1940
- Lieutenant Commander J.A.L. Drummond, RN, from 25 July 1940
- Lieutenant A.G. Leatham, RN, from 29 November 1941
- Lieutenant R.L. Williamson, DSC, RN, from 17 June 1942
- Lieutenant R.S. Baker-Faulkner, RN, from 1 July 1942
- Lieutenant C.H.C. O’Rourke, RN, from 10 October 1942
- Lieutenant Commander W.J. Mainprice, RN, from 25 March 1943
- Lieutenant Commander(A) T.T. Miller, RN, from 3 November 1943
- Lieutenant Commander(A) J.L. Fisher, RNVR, from 7 November 1943
- Lieutenant Commander(A) B.W. Vigrass, RNVR, from 6 May 1944
- Lieutenant Commander(A) D.R. Park, RNZNVR, from 4 February 1945
- Lieutenant Commander(A) S.G. Cooke, RN, from 12 August 1945
- Lieutenant(A) D.C. Hill, MBE, RNZNVR, from 8 December 1945
- Lieutenant Commander(A) F.A. Swanton, DSC, RN, from 22 January 1946
- Lieutenant J.C.S. Wright, RN, from 26 August 1946
- Lieutenant Commander L.D. Empson, RN, from 24 November 1946
- Lieutenant Commander F.A. Swanton, DSC, RN, from 22 January 1947
- Lieutenant J.S. Toner, RN, from 14 January 1949
- Lieutenant P.H. Mogridge, DSC, RN, from 27 April 1949
- Lieutenant W.E. Simpson, DSC, RN, from 29 November 1949
- Lieutenant Commander C.K. Roberts, RN, from 19 April 1950
- Lieutenant M.E. Stanley, RN, from 20 June 1951
- Lieutenant Commander D.O’D. Newbery, RN, from 3 September 1951
- Lieutenant Commander L.J. Baker, RN, 14 November 1953
- disbanded - 15 May 1954

1954 - 1955

- Lieutenant Commander L.J. Baker, RN, from 20 September 1954
- Lieutenant B.T. Jones, RN, 10 January 1955
- disbanded - 31 March 1955

1956 - 1957

- Lieutenant Commander G.B. Newby, AFC, RN, 1 March 1956
- disbanded - 1 April 1957

1969 - 1972

- Lieutenant Commander P.C. Marshall, AFC, RN, from 14 January 1969
- Lieutenant Commander D.A. Borrowman, RN, from 23 June 1970
- Lieutenant Commander M.J. Doust, RN, 16 June 1971
- disbanded - 1 August 1972

Note: Abbreviation (A) signifies Air Branch of the RN or RNVR.

== See also ==
- McDonnell Douglas Phantom in UK service
