= 731 Naval Air Squadron =

Inactive flying squadron of the Royal Navy's Fleet Air Arm

- Squadron badge
- Active: 1943–1945
- Disbanded: 1 November 1945
- Country: United Kingdom
- Branch: Royal Navy
- Type: Fleet Air Arm Second Line Squadron
- Role: Deck Landing Control Officer training squadron
- Size: Squadron
- Part of: Fleet Air Arm
- Home station: RNAS East Haven (HMS Peewit)
- Mottos: Circum Undique (Latin for 'From everywhere around')
- Aircraft: See Aircraft flown section for full list.

Insignia
- Squadron Badge Description: Blue, in base a 19th Century anchor in bend gold with a seagull white alighting thereon (1945)
- Identification Markings: E3A+ E3H1+ (Hurricane)

731 Naval Air Squadron (731 NAS) was a Fleet Air Arm (FAA) naval air squadron of the United Kingdom's Royal Navy (RN). It was active between 1943 and 1945 and its sole role throughout its formation was a Deck Landing Control Officer training squadron. Through this role the squadron pilots were nicknamed 'Clockwork Mice'. It was based out of the purpose-built airbase, commissioned as HMS Peewit, known as Royal Naval Air Station East Haven, in Scotland, as part of the Deck Landing Training School there.

== History ==
=== Deck Landing Control Officer training (1943–1945) ===
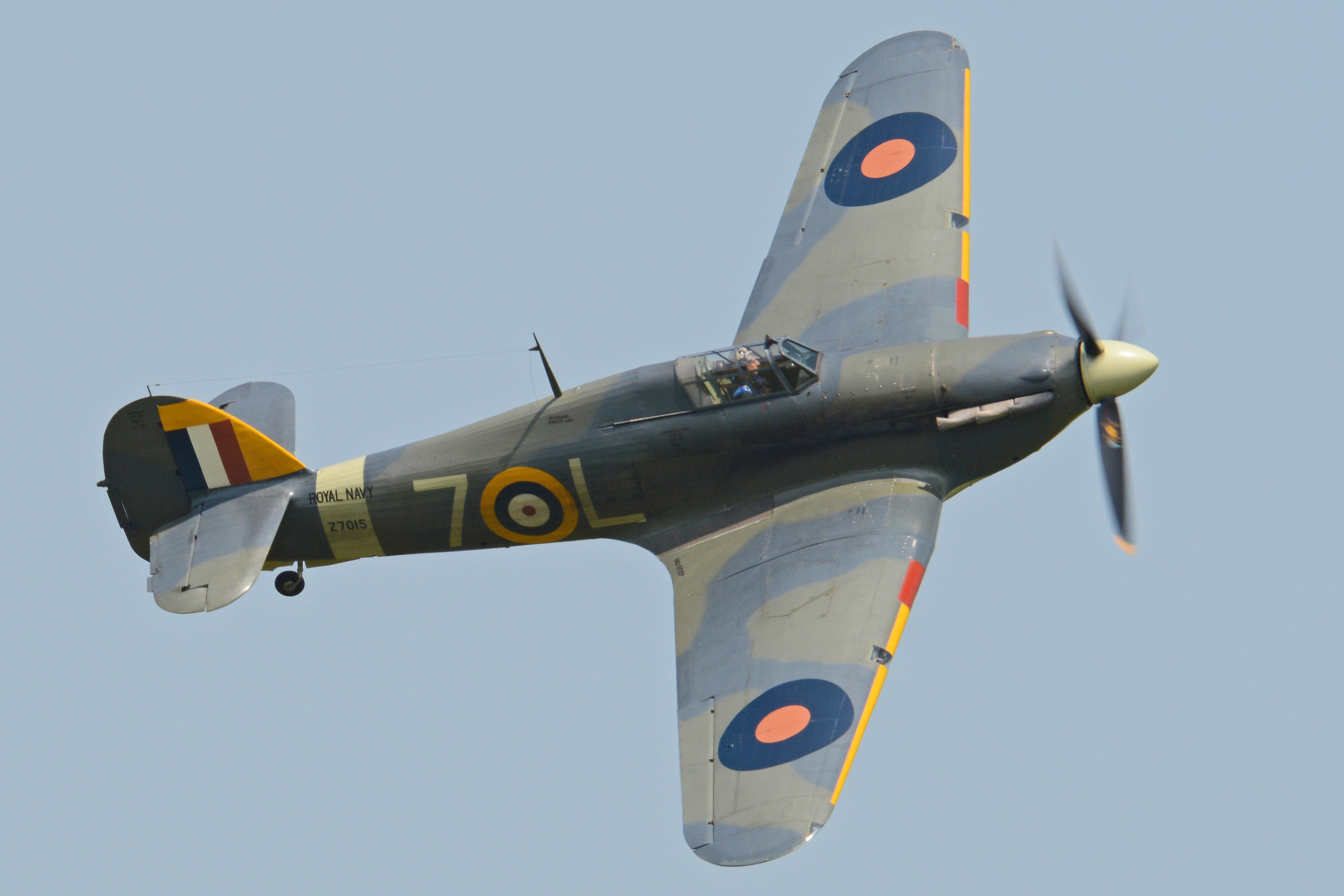
Hawker Sea Hurricane Ib 'Z7015 - 7-L' (G-BKTH). Example of aircraft used by 731 NAS

On 5 December 1943, 731 Naval Air Squadron was formed at RNAS East Haven (HMS Peewit), located approximately 1.5 miles (2 km) east of Carnoustie and 5 miles (8 km) south west of Arbroath, in Angus, Scotland, as a Deck Landing Control Officer training squadron for the training of Deck Landing Control Officers (DLCOs). The initial commanding officer was Lieutenant Commander(A) K. Stilliard, RNVR and squadron strength was thirteen pilots. It was equipped with a mix of the biplane torpedo bomber Fairey Swordfish, marks I & II, and Hawker Sea Hurricane Mk IIb, a navalised version of the Hawker Hurricane fighter aircraft. The squadron teamed up with two other Naval Air Squadrons, 767 Naval Air Squadron, a Deck Landing Training squadron and 769 Naval Air Squadron, a Torpedo, bomber and reconnaissance (TBR) Deck Landing Training squadron. Together they formed the Deck Landing Training School at RNAS East Haven (HMS Peewit).

==== Training ====
731 Naval Air Squadron pilots, who were already qualified for carrier deck landing, operated a number of various Fleet Air Arm aircraft. Initially operating with Hawker Sea Hurricane and Fairey Swordfish, they flew continuous circuits and approaches to land on whichever runway was in use. This enabled the prospective DLCOs to direct their approach and familiarise themselves with the differing landing characteristics across the aircraft types operated within the Fleet Air Arm.

The runway in use was known as the 'Dummy Deck', the trainee DLCOs were known as 'Batsmen' and the repetitive work earned them the nickname 'Clockwork Mice'. A Dummy Carrier Island was introduced, in an attempt to create authenticity, in the form of a converted 1930s Albion bus and given the nickname 'HMS Spurious Mark II'.

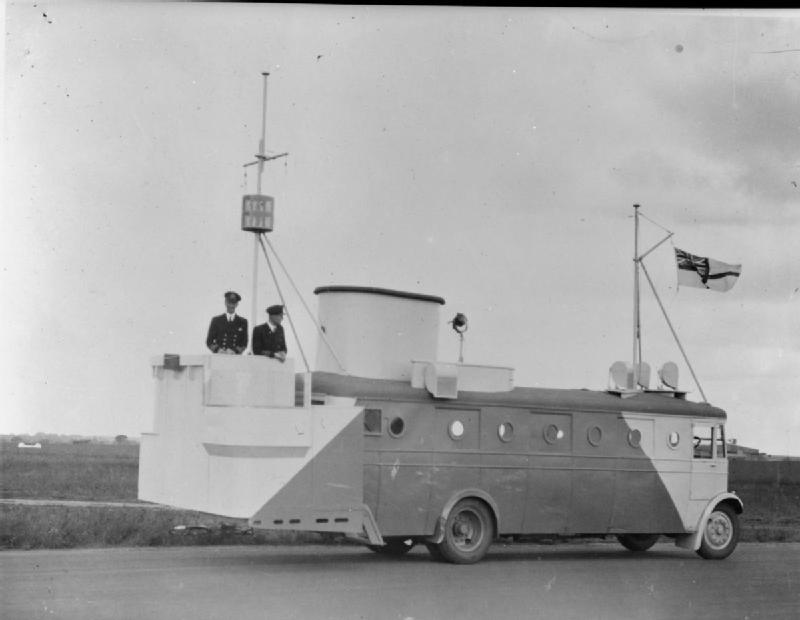
Royal Navy officers 'aboard' 'HMS SPURIOUS MARK II' - a bus converted to resemble the island of an aircraft carrier. The bus is being driven along a runway or taxi way at Royal Naval Air Station East Haven at Carnoustie, Scotland.

Trainee DLCOs used high visibility paddles during the day and illuminated paddles at night. The paddles were similar to tennis rackets or 'bats', hence the DLCOs being referred to as 'bats'. The DLCO trainees had to learn the different signals used to communicate with the pilot during an intensive three week training course. Signals were given until the aircraft was committed to land, however, if the approach was deemed unsafe the trainee would 'wave him off', to go around for another approach. Training in aircraft carrier flight deck activities and incidents was provided through the Aircraft Handling and Fire Fighting School, located at HMS Peewit. Curriculum included aircraft parking and taxiing after landing, simulated ready for takeoff manoeuvring, the spreading and folding of wings and fire fighting.

The training course ended with the trainees operating on an actual aircraft carriers. A number of escort aircraft carriers were assigned as Deck Landing Training (DLT) Carriers. Carriers on DLT duty included:

- Attacker-class escort carrier, HMS Ravager (January 1944)
- Ruler-class escort carrier, HMS Khedive (June 1944)
- Ruler-class escort carrier, HMS Rajah (August 1944)
- Ruler-class escort carrier, HMS Ranee (November 1944)
- Ruler-class escort carrier, HMS Speaker (November 1944)
- Ruler-class escort carrier, HMS Smiter (January - May - April 1945)
- Attacker-class escort carrier, HMS Battler (D18) (July – September 1945).

Fairey Fulmar, a British carrier-borne reconnaissance and fighter aircraft, arrived in early 1944, with these aircraft followed by Supermarine Seafire, a naval version of the Supermarine Spitfire single seat fighter adapted for operation from aircraft carriers, and Vought Corsair, an American fighter aircraft, by mid 1944. Around December 1944 the squadron received Fairey Firefly, a carrier-borne fighter aircraft and anti-submarine aircraft, with Fairey Barracuda, a British carrier-borne torpedo and dive bomber, arriving around the middle of 1945.

==== Disbandment ====
731 Naval Air Squadron was disbanded on 1 November 1945 at RNAS East Haven (HMS Peewit), its role absorbed into 767 and 768 Deck Landing Training Squadrons.

== Aircraft flown ==
The squadron has flown a number of different aircraft types, including:

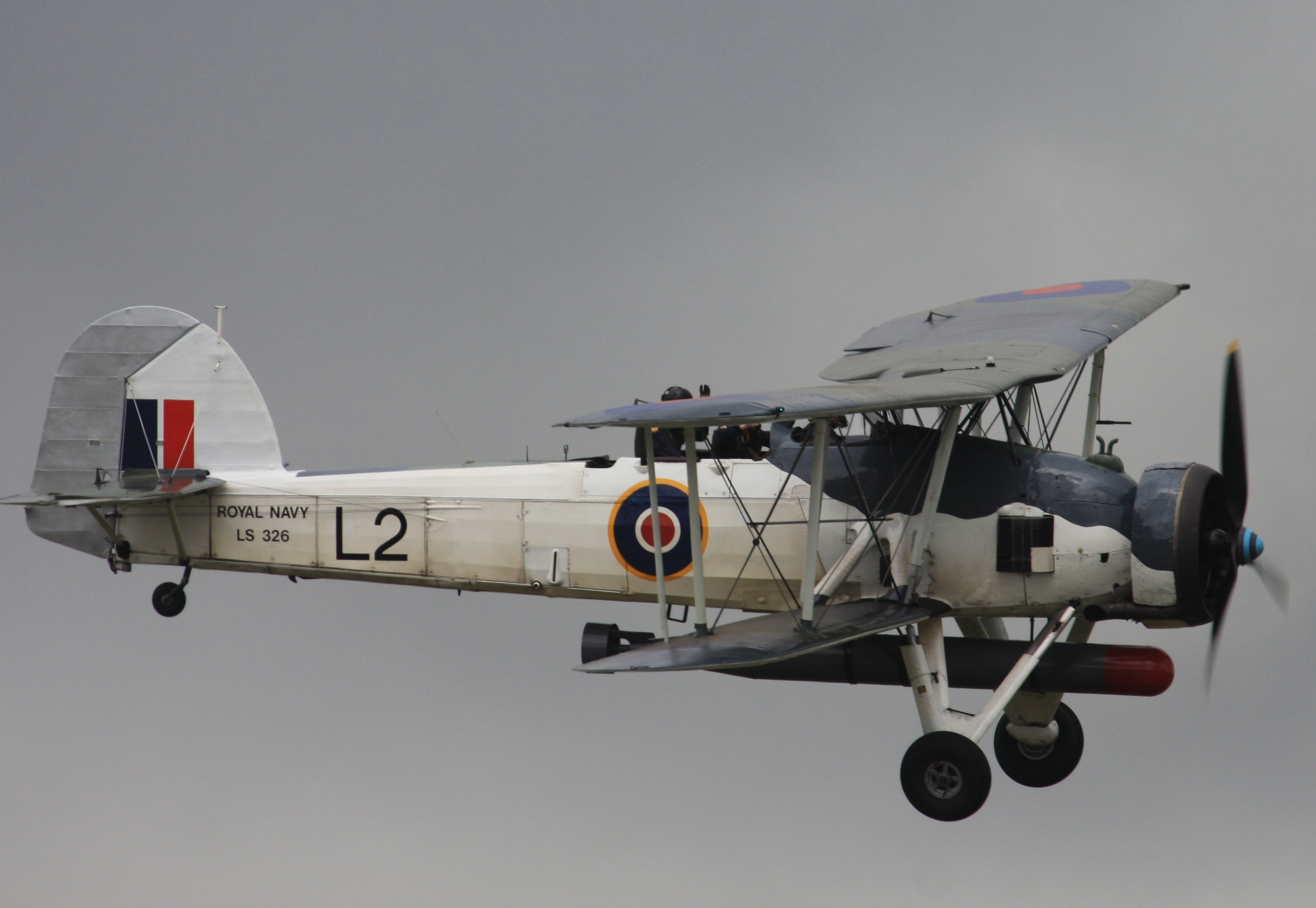
LS326 Fairey Swordfish Mk2 Royal Navy Fleet Air Arm of the type used by 731 NAS throughout its existence

- Hawker Hurricane Mk Ib fighter aircraft (December 1943 - June 1944)
- Fairey Swordfish I torpedo bomber (December 1943 - November 1945)
- Fairey Swordfish II torpedo bomber (December 1943 - November 1945)
- Fairey Fulmar Mk.II reconnaissance/fighter aircraft (March 1944 - June 1944)
- Supermarine Seafire Mk Ib fighter aircraft (May 1944 - February 1945)
- Vought Corsair Mk II fighter-bomber (June 1944 - November 1945)
- Vought Corsair Mk III fighter-bomber (June 1944 - November 1945)
- Fairey Swordfish III torpedo bomber (November 1944 - November 1945)
- Fairey Firefly I fighter and anti-submarine aircraft (December 1944 - November 1945)
- Supermarine Seafire F Mk IIc fighter aircraft (February 1945 - November 1945)
- Fairey Barracuda Mk II torpedo and dive bomber (July 1945 - November 1945)

== Naval air stations ==
731 Naval Air Squadron operated from a single naval air station of the Royal Navy in Scotland:

- Royal Naval Air Station East Haven (HMS Peewit), Angus, (5 December 1943 - 1 November 1945)
- disbanded - (1 November 1945)

== Commanding officers ==
List of commanding officers of 731 Naval Air Squadron, with date of appointment:

- Lieutenant Commander(A) K. Stillard, RNVR, from 5 December 1943
- Lieutenant Commander R. Prideham-Wippell, RN, from 1 January 1945
- disbanded - 1 November 1945

Note: Abbreviation (A) signifies Air Branch of the RN or RNVR.
