= RNAS East Haven =

Former Royal Naval Air Station in Angus, Scotland

RNAS East Haven HMS Peewit
- East Haven, Angus in Scotland

Site information
- Type: Royal Naval Air Station
- Owner: Admiralty
- Operator: Royal Navy
- Controlled by: Fleet Air Arm
- Condition: Disused

Location
- Shown within Angus RNAS East Haven (the United Kingdom)
- Coordinates: 56°31′40″N 002°39′28″W

Site history
- Built: 1943
- In use: 1943 - 1949
- Fate: Farmland / Water treatment works
- Battles/wars: European theatre of World War II

Airfield information
Runways
Direction	Length and surface
01/19	969 metres (3,179 ft) Concrete
05/23	1,115 metres (3,658 ft) Concrete
10/28	928 metres (3,045 ft) Concrete
14/32	914 metres (2,999 ft) Concrete

Royal Naval Air Station East Haven, more commonly known as RNAS East Haven; (commissioned HMS Peewit), is a former Royal Navy, Naval Air Station , situated 3 miles (5 km) south west of Arbroath and 0.5 miles (1 km) north of the coastal village of East Haven, Angus Scotland.

The air station was purpose-built for the Admiralty to provide training and operational instruction for personnel of the Fleet Air Arm (FAA). It primarily functioned as a Deck Landing Training School, including instruction for Deck Landing Control Officers. The station also supported torpedo bomber reconnaissance (TBR) training, as well as courses in aircraft handling and firefighting.

The following units were here at some point:

- 731 Naval Air Squadron
- 767 Naval Air Squadron
- 768 Naval Air Squadron
- 769 Naval Air Squadron
- 826 Naval Air Squadron

== See also ==
- List of air stations of the Royal Navy
