= 768 Naval Air Squadron =

Inactive flying squadron of the Royal Navy's Fleet Air Arm

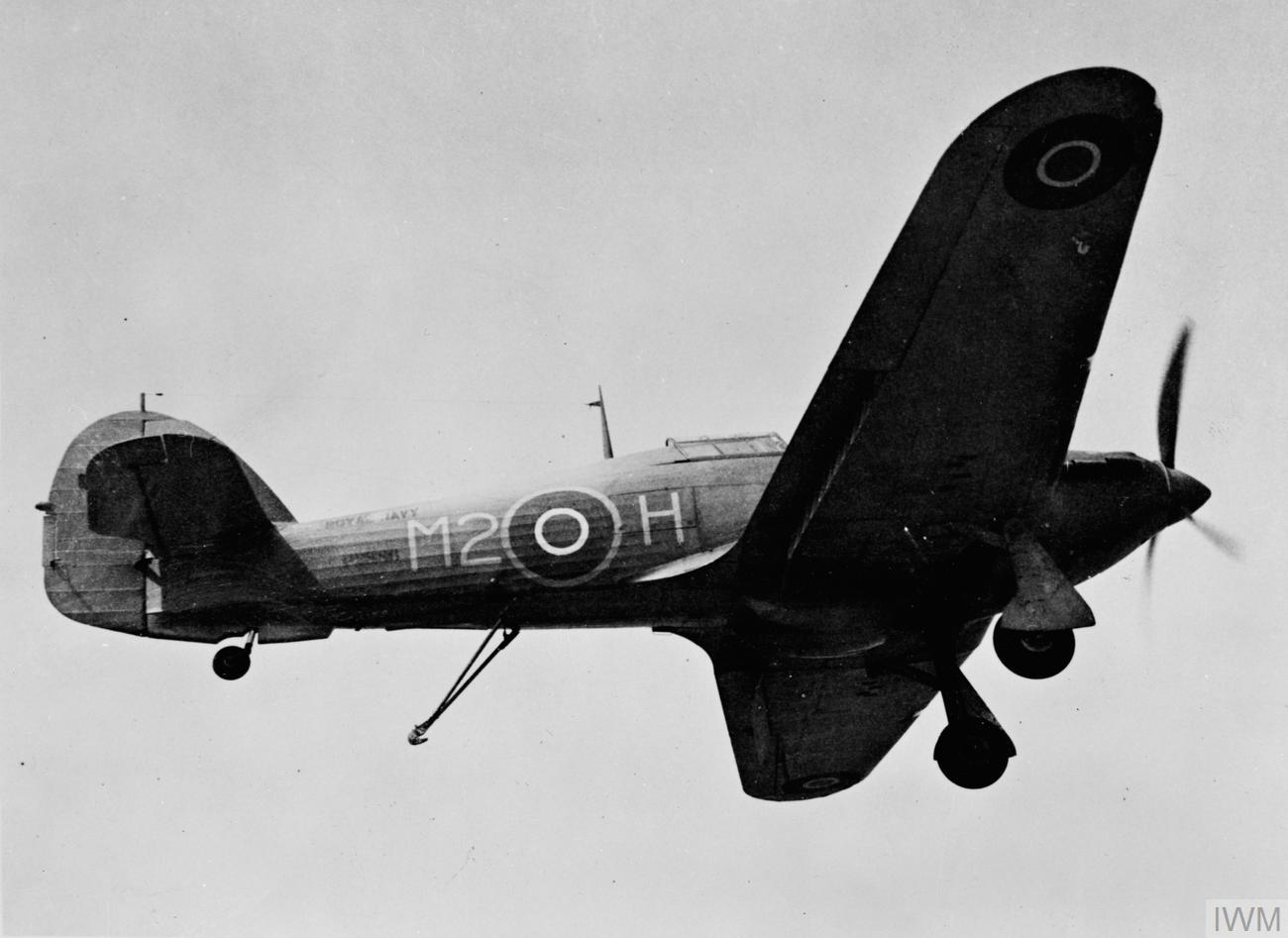
- A Hawker Sea Hurricane of 768 NAS approaching HMS Argus during 1942
- Active: 1941–1946; 1948–1949
- Disbanded: 8 March 1949
- Country: United Kingdom
- Branch: Royal Navy
- Type: Fleet Air Arm Second Line Squadron
- Role: Deck Landing Training Squadron; Deck Landing Control Officer Training Squadron
- Size: Squadron
- Part of: Fleet Air Arm
- Home station: See Naval air stations section for full list.
- Aircraft: See Aircraft operated section for full list.

Insignia
- Squadron Badge: An upright grey clockwork mouse with white wings and red eyes holding white bats, the winding key blue, to represent the squadron's DLCO activities. Wartime unofficial
- Identification Markings: individual letters (1939-1943); M2A+ & individual letters (all types from March 1943); B2A+ & individual letters (all types from January 1944); E2A+ (October 1944) B2A+ (Seafire from December 1948); 213-214 (Firefly from December 1948)
- Fin Shore Codes: JR (Firefly from December 1948)

768 Naval Air Squadron (768 NAS) was a Fleet Air Arm (FAA) naval air squadron of the United Kingdom’s Royal Navy (RN). It last disbanded at HMS Gannet, RNAS Eglinton, Northern Ireland, in March 1949, having been formed as a Deck Landing Control Officer Training Squadron, in December 1948, to ensure one American-style signal trained DLCO could be located at every FAA station. It first formed as part of the Deck Landing Training School at HMS Condor, RNAS Arbroath, in January 1941, as a Deck Landing Training Squadron. Advanced training was in HMS Argus, for which a detachment was maintained at HMS Landrail, RNAS Machrihanish, where it wholly moved to in March 1943. September saw a move to RAF Heathfield, Ayr, followed by a further move to HMS Sanderling, RNAS Abbotsinch in January 1944. Training used escort carriers on the Firth of Clyde and a detachment was maintained at (Heathfield)Ayr throughout this period, with the squadron returning there in July 1945, at this time HMS Wagtail, RNAS Ayr. In August the squadron moved to HMS Corncrake, RNAS Ballyhalbert in Northern Ireland but then in October it joined up with the Deck Landing School at HMS Peewit, RNAS East Haven, Scotland, where it disbanded in April 1946.

== History ==
=== Deck Landing Training Squadron (1941–1946) ===
768 Naval Air Squadron formed as a Deck Landing Training Squadron, on 13 January 1941, at RNAS Arbroath (HMS Condor), located near Arbroath in East Angus, Scotland. The squadron was initially equipped with Fairey Swordfish, a biplane torpedo bomber aircraft. Dummy deck landing was trained at RNAS Arbroath, but advanced carrier deck landing training was done on the unique HMS Argus, the Royal Navy aircraft carrier, that was converted from an ocean liner and served as a training ship, via a detachment at RNAS Machrihanish (HMS Landrail), located 3 miles (5 km) west of Campbeltown in Argyll and Bute, Scotland. The squadron moved there full time on 1 March 1943.

By this time the squadron operated a Fairey Fulmar, a British carrier-borne reconnaissance/fighter aircraft, Grumman Martlet, an American carrier-based fighter aircraft; a Hawker Sea Hurricane and Supermarine Spitfire (hooked), fighter aircraft, alongside the initial Fairey Swordfish.

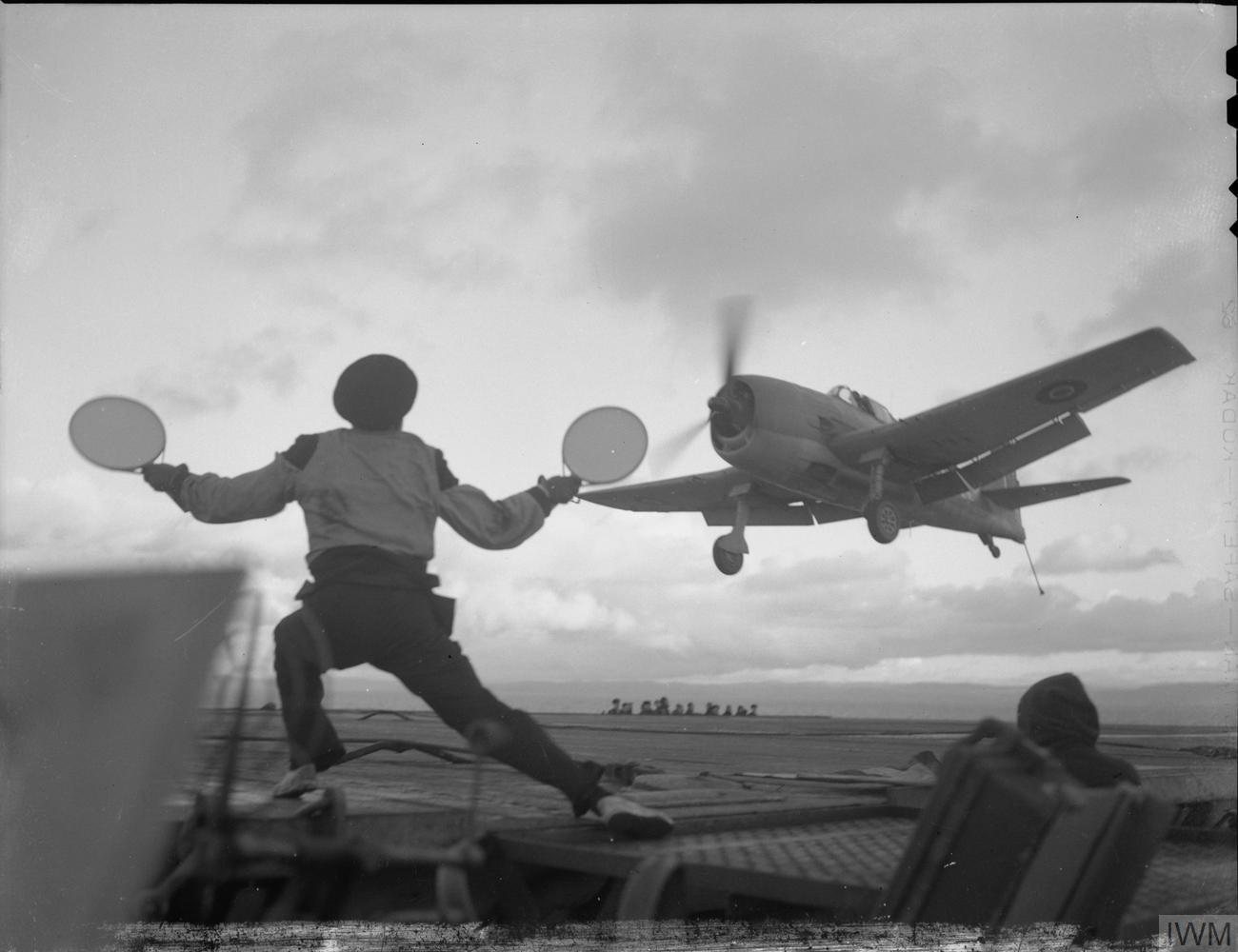
A Grumman Hellcat landing on HMS Ravager as the batsman makes the all-clear signal

HMS Argus was joined by the Attacker-class escort carrier, HMS Ravager, by July 1943, giving the DLT school a second deck in the Firth of Clyde and Irish Sea training areas. Other escort carriers also provided decks for the expanding deck landing training programme, during the Second World War. The squadron left RNAS Machrihanish on 29 September and relocated to RAF Heathfield, Ayr, where it received Gumman Hellcat, an American carrier-based fighter aircraft. This was followed shortly later by a move to RNAS Abbotsinch (HMS Sanderling), Paisley, Renfrewshire, where it received Grumman Avenger, an American torpedo bomber, Vought Corsair, an American carrier-based fighter aircraft and later Fairey Firefly, a British carrier-based fighter and anti-submarine aircraft. The squadron also kept a detachment at RAF Heathfield, used as a forward airfield to be near the aircraft carrier training areas.

The squadron saw more moves during 1945, first back to Heathfield, now a Naval Air Station, RNAS Ayr (HMS Wagtail), on 5 July 1945, then across the Irish Sea to RNAS Ballyhalbert (HMS Corncrake), County Down, Northern Ireland, on 28 August, and finally, across to the east coast of Scotland, moving to RNAS East Haven (HMS Peewit), Angus, Scotland, to join up with the Deck Landing School, on 25 October, where it absorbed part of 731 Naval Air Squadron in November. 768 Naval Air Squadron disbanded at RNAS East Haven on 16 April 1946.

=== Deck Landing Control Officer Training Squadron (1948–1949) ===
768 Naval Air Squadron reformed at RNAS Eglinton (HMS Gannet), Derry, Northern Ireland, as a Deck Landing Control Officer Training squadron, on 15 December 1948. It was equipped with eight Supermarine Seafire F Mk XV, a navalised version of a Supermarine Spitfire fighter aircraft and two Fairey Firefly FR.I, the initial fighter/reconnaissance variant.

The squadron was required to train a number of Deck Landing Control Officers (DLCO) to the new American-style standard, needed so that one DLCO could be located at every FAA station. There was a significant number of FAA pilots who had been trained on the old British style of deck control signals and therefore needed training in the new signals to ensure they were eligible for RN aircraft carrier operations. 768 Naval Air Squadron graduated fifteen DLCOs before it disbanded at RNAS Eglinton on 8 March 1949.

== Aircraft operated ==
The squadron operated a variety of different aircraft and versions:

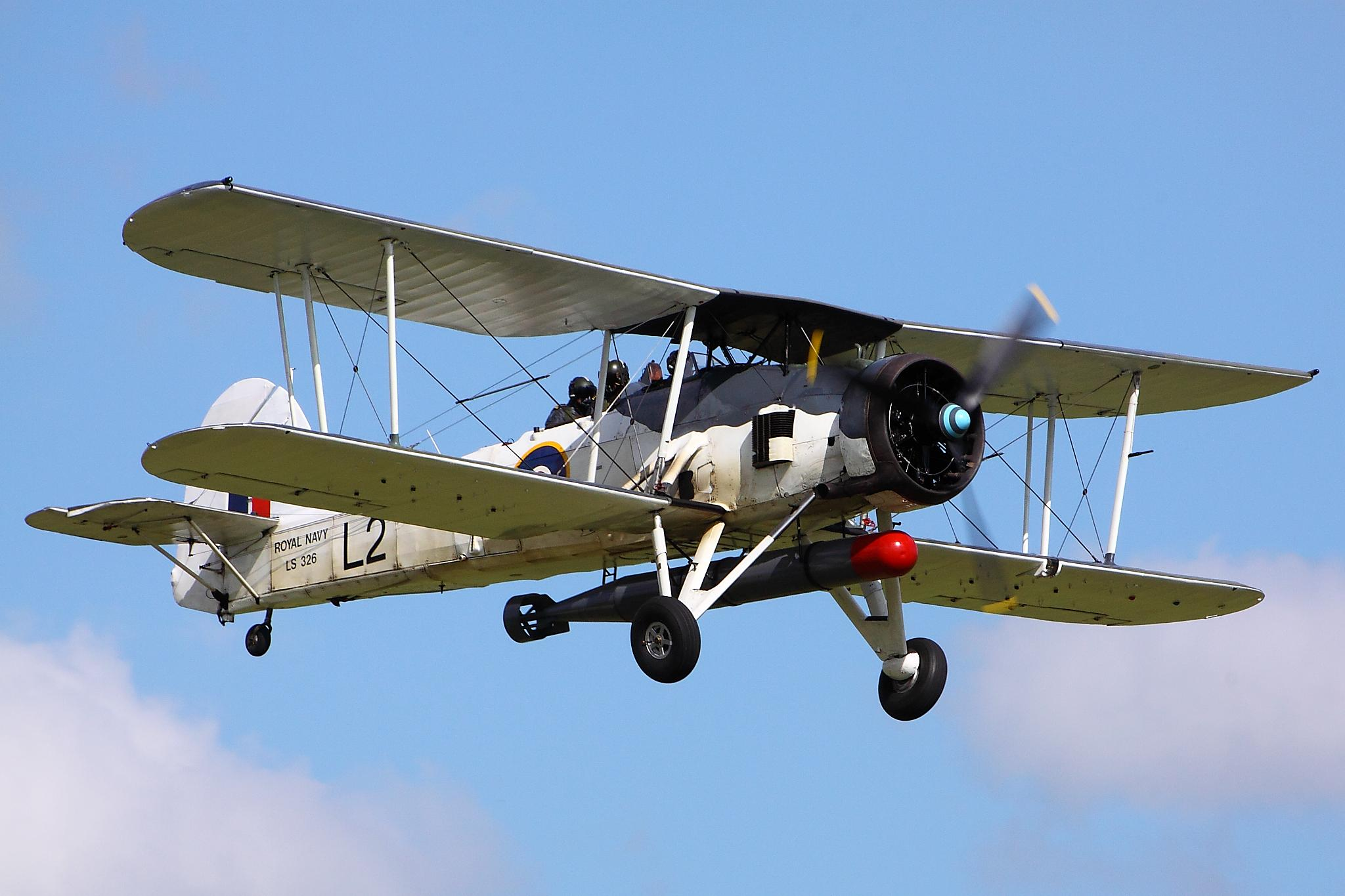
Fairey Swordfish II

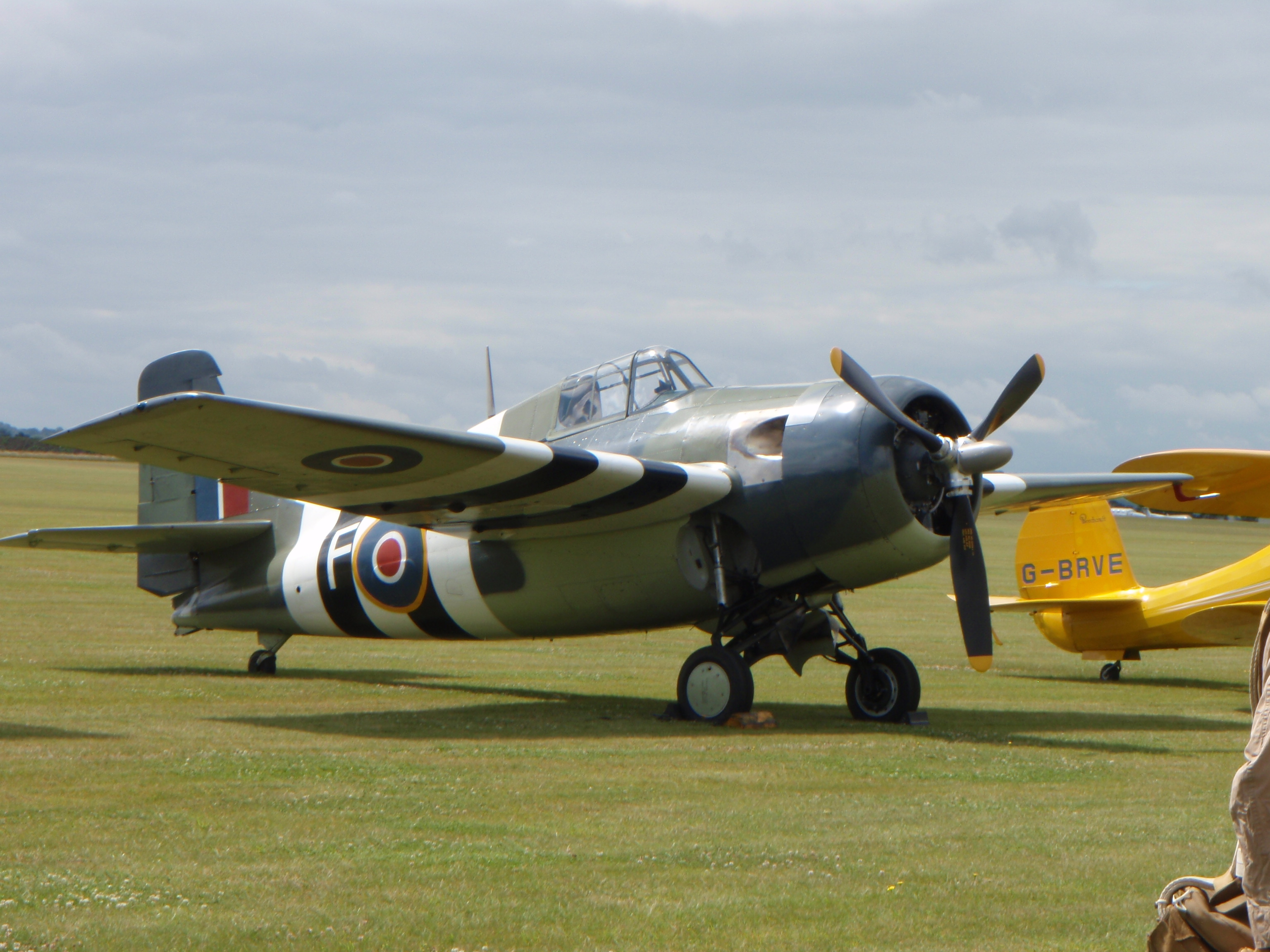
Grumman Martlet

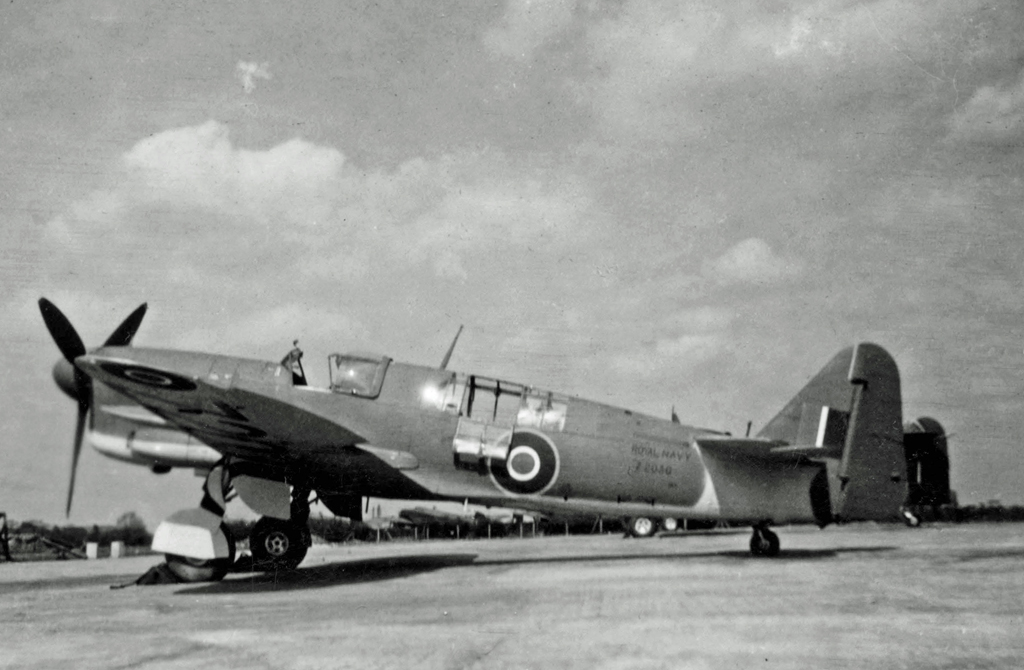
Fairey Firefly FR.I

- Blackburn Skua dive bomber and fighter aircraft (April - June 1941)
- Fairey Swordfish I torpedo bomber (January 1941 - December 1944)
- Fairey Fulmar Mk.II reconnaissance/fighter aircraft (April 1941 - 1944)
- Grumman Martlet Mk I fighter aircraft (April 1941 - October 1944)
- Vought Chesapeake Mk.I dive bomber (July - September 1941)
- Fairey Fulmar Mk.I reconnaissance/fighter aircraft (September 1941 - January 1944)
- Hawker Sea Hurricane Mk IB fighter aircraft (1941 - March 1944)
- Supermarine Spitfire Mk Vb/hooked fighter aircraft (October 1942 - February 1945)
- Fairey Albacore torpedo bomber (January - September 1943)
- Grumman Martlet Mk II fighter aircraft (January 1943 - September 1944)
- Grumman Martlet Mk IV fighter aircraft (February 1943 - June 1945)
- Fairey Barracuda Mk I torpedo and dive bomber (July - September 1943)
- Supermarine Seafire Mk Ib fighter aircraft (July 1943 - February 1945)
- Fairey Swordfish II (July 1943 - October 1945)
- Fairey Barracuda Mk II torpedo and dive bomber (July 1943 - October 1945)
- Grumman Hellcat F. Mk. I fighter aircraft (October 1943 - September 1945)
- North American Harvard III advanced trainer aircraft (December 1943 - 1944)
- Hawker Sea Hurricane Mk IIC fighter aircraft (December 1943)
- de Havilland Tiger Moth trainer aircraft (January - June 1944)
- Grumman Tarpon GR.I torpedo bomber (January 1944 - May 1945)
- Supermarine Seafire Mk IIc fighter aircraft (January 1944 - April 1946)
- Vought Corsair Mk II fighter bomber (March 1944 - September 1945)
- Grumman Wildcat Mk V fighter aircraft (May 1944 - July 1945)
- Supermarine Seafire F Mk III fighter aircraft (May 1944 - April 1946)
- Grumman Avenger Mk.II torpedo bomber (July 1944 - May 1945)
- Vought Corsair Mk III fighter bomber (August 1944 - April 1946)
- Fairey Firefly I fighter aircraft (September 1944 - July 1945)
- Vought Corsair Mk IV fighter bomber (September 1945 - April 1946)
- Fairey Firefly FR.I fighter/reconnaissance aircraft (December 1948 - March 1949)
- Supermarine Seafire F Mk XV fighter aircraft (December 1948 - March 1949)

== Naval air stations ==
768 Naval Air Squadron operated from a number of naval air station of the Royal Navy, in the United Kingdom:

1941 - 1946

- Royal Naval Air Station Arbroath (HMS Condor), Angus, (13 January 1941 - 1 March 1943)
  - (Detachment Royal Naval Air Station Machrihanish (HMS Landrail)), Argyll and Bute
- Royal Naval Air Station Machrihanish (HMS Landrail), Argyll and Bute, (1 March 1943 - 29 September 1943)
- Royal Air Force Heathfield, South Ayrshire, (29 September 1943 - 19 January 1944)
- Royal Air Station Abbotsinch (HMS Sanderling), Renfrewshire, (19 January 1944 - 5 July 1945)
  - (also used Royal Naval Air Station Machrihanish (HMS Landrail)), Argyll and Bute
- Royal Naval Air Station Ayr (HMS Wagtail), South Ayrshire, (5 July 1945 - 28 August 1945)
- Royal Naval Air Station Ballyhalbert (HMS Corncrake), County Down, (28 August 1945 - 25 October 1945)
- Royal Naval Air Station East Haven (HMS Peewit), Angus, (25 October 1945 - 16 April 1946)
- disbanded - (16 April 1946)

1948 - 1949

- Royal Naval Air Station Eglinton (HMS Gannet), County Londonderry, (15 December 1948 - 8 March 1949)
- disbanded - (8 March 1949)

== Commanding officers ==
List of commanding officers of 768 Naval Air Squadron with date of appointment:

1941 - 1946

- Lieutenant Commander V.C. Grenfell, RN, from 13 January 1941
- Lieutenant Commander(A) F.D.G. Jennings, RN, from 26 June 1941 (KIFA 2 July 1941)
- not identified 3 July 1941
- Lieutenant N.G. Hallett, RN, from 28 September 1941
- Lieutenant J.C.M. Harman, RN, from 1 November 1941
- Lieutenant(A) P.B. Jackson, RN, from 15 March 1942
- Lieutenant Commander(A) D.M. Brown, RNVR, from 29 December 1942
- Lieutenant Commander(A) D.J.W. Williams, RN, from 1 March 1943
- Lieutenant Commander(A) J.S. Bailey, RN, from 8 July 1943
- Lieutenant Commander(A) I.M. Brown, DSC, RNVR, from 29 October 1944
- Lieutenant Commander R. Pridham-Wippell, RN, from 1 November 1945
- Lieutenant N.A. Bartlett, RN, from 10 January 1946
- disbanded - 16 April 1946

1948 - 1949

- Lieutenant D.G. MacQueen, MBE, RN, from 15 December 1948
- disbanded - 8 March 1949

Note: Abbreviation (A) signifies Air Branch of the RN or RNVR.
