= RNAS Fearn =

Former Royal Naval Air Station in the Scottish Highlands, Scotland

RNAS Fearn HMS Owl RAF Fearn
- Easter Airfield
- Fearn, Scottish Highlands in Scotland

Site information
- Type: Royal Naval Air Station
- Owner: Admiralty
- Operator: Royal Navy
- Controlled by: Fleet Air Arm
- Condition: Limited civil aviation

Location
- Shown within the Scottish Highlands RNAS Fearn (the United Kingdom)
- Coordinates: 57°45′28″N 003°56′54″W

Site history
- Built: 1941
- In use: October 1942 - July 1946 -1957
- Fate: Civil Aviation / Farmland / Industry
- Battles/wars: European theatre of World War II

Airfield information
- Elevation: 8 metres (26 ft) AMSL
Runways
Direction	Length and surface
05/23	1,348 metres (4,423 ft) Concrete
11/29	1,152 metres (3,780 ft) Concrete
18/36	1,078 metres (3,537 ft) Concrete

Royal Naval Air Station Fearn, more commonly known as RNAS Fearn; (commissioned HMS Owl), is a former Royal Navy Naval Air Station, located 5.4 miles (8.7 km) southeast of Tain, Scottish Highlands and 21.9 miles (35.2 km) northeast of Inverness, Scottish Highlands, Scotland. The Tower has now been converted to residential use. See Restoration Man George Clarke.

Situated around 1 mile (2 km) from the north west shore of the Moray Firth, the airfield is 8.5 miles (14 km) north east of the town and port of Invergordon and 1 mile (2 km) south east of the village of Fearn. Notable landmarks include Tarbat Ness and Cromarty Firth.

== History ==
The Royal Navy acquired the airbase when on 15 July 1942 it was transferred from the RAF to the Admiralty and was known as Royal Naval Air Station Fearn (RNAS Fearn). On 11 October it was commissioned as HMS Owl. The airbase had initially opened in late 1941 as a satellite for RAF Tain, known as RAF Fearn, before the Fleet Air Arm took it over. HMS Owl was home to the Royal Navy’s Barracuda Operational Training Unit, No. 1 Barracuda Servicing Unit and No. 3 Barracuda Servicing Unit along with No. 1 Avenger Servicing Unit. There was also No. 2 Torpedo School. The site also included accommodation for disembarked squadrons.

== Units ==
A number of units were here at some point:

- No. 8 Advanced Flying Training School RAF
- 708 Naval Air Squadron
- 714 Naval Air Squadron
- 717 Naval Air Squadron
- 719 Naval Air Squadron
- 736B Flight
- 747 Naval Air Squadron
- 812 Naval Air Squadron
- 814 Naval Air Squadron
- 815 Naval Air Squadron
- 816 Naval Air Squadron
- 817 Naval Air Squadron
- 818 Naval Air Squadron
- 819 Naval Air Squadron
- 821 Naval Air Squadron
- 822 Naval Air Squadron
- 823 Naval Air Squadron
- 824 Naval Air Squadron
- 825 Naval Air Squadron
- 826 Naval Air Squadron
- 828 Naval Air Squadron
- 837 Naval Air Squadron
- 841 Naval Air Squadron
- 847 Naval Air Squadron
- 860 Naval Air Squadron

== Current use ==
The site is currently used as farmland. On the southeast edge, a new, separate, aerodrome has been created by the name of "Easter Airfield". The control tower is now a private residence owned. It was in a 2015 episode of Channel 4's The Restoration Man. A lot of the original buildings on the other side of the camp are derelict and only have trash from fly-tipping, crows and bugs in them.

== See also ==
- Military history of Scotland
- Naval air station
