= RM Condor =

Royal Marines base in Angus, Scotland

RM Condor
- Near Arbroath, Angus in Scotland
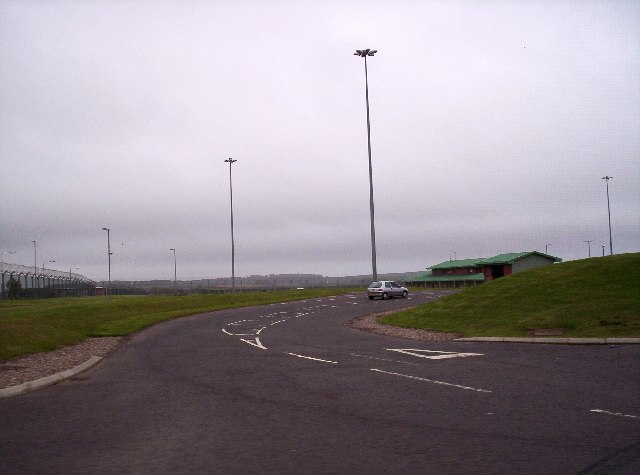
- The entrance to RM Condor

Site information
- Type: Royal Marines base
- Owner: Ministry of Defence
- Operator: Royal Navy
- Controlled by: Royal Marines
- Condition: Operational
- Website: RM Condor - Royal Navy

Location
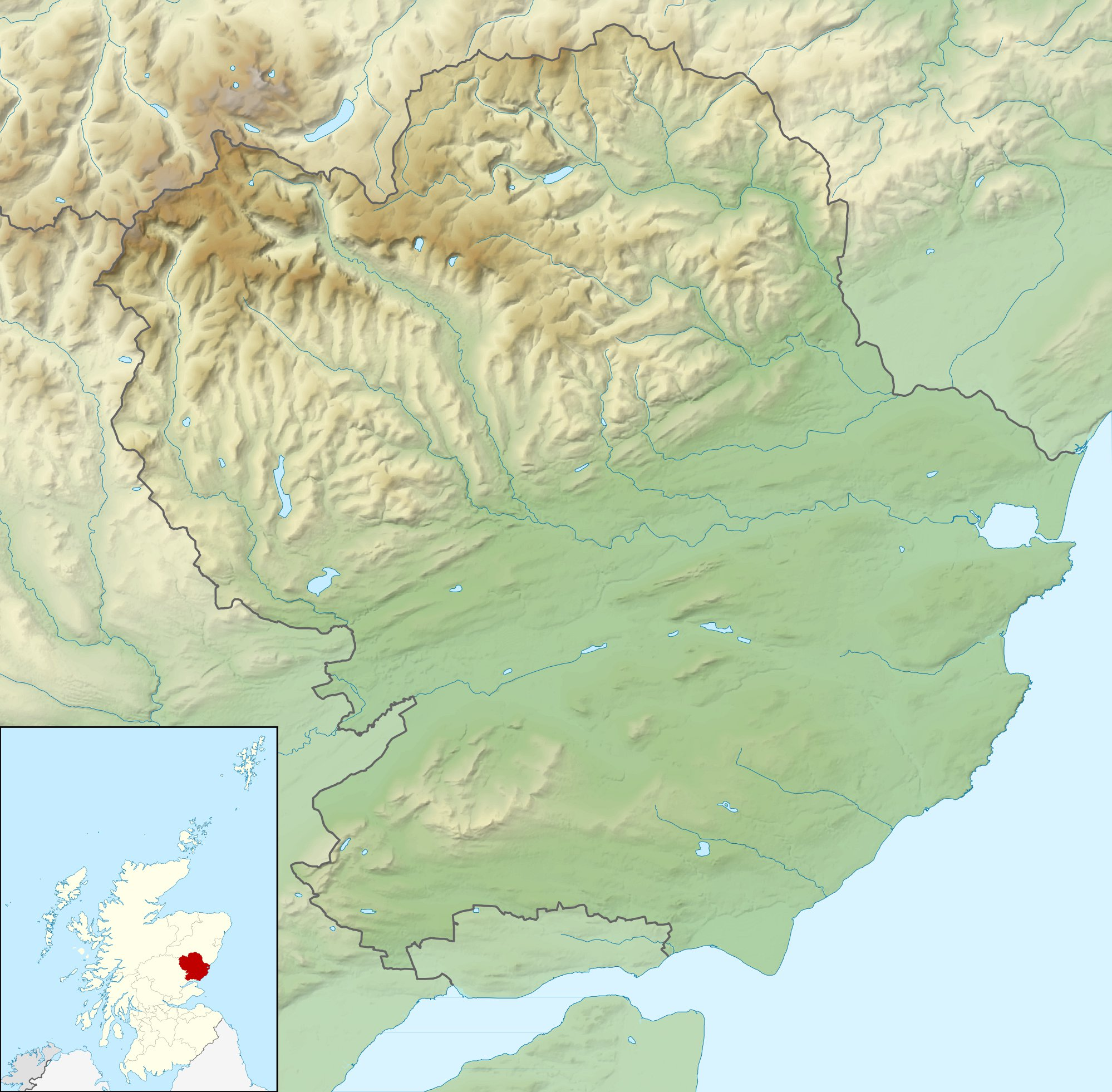
- Shown within Angus RM Condor (the United Kingdom)
- Coordinates: 56°34′56″N 002°37′31″W
- Area: 201 hectares

Site history
- Built: 1938
- In use: 1938 – 1971 (Fleet Air Arm); 1971 – present (Royal Marines)

Garrison information
- Current commander: Lieutenant Colonel Innes Catton
- Garrison: UK Commando Force
- Occupants: 45 Commando Group: 45 Commando; 7 (Sphinx) Battery Royal Artillery; 2 (City of Dundee) Signal Squadron; 30 Commando Information Exploitation Group Royal Military Police Detachment

Airfield information
- Elevation: 49 metres (161 ft) AMSL
Helipads
Number	Length and surface
00	50x50m Concrete

RM Condor is a large Royal Marines base located near Arbroath in East Angus, Scotland. The base also houses 7 (Sphinx) Battery Royal Artillery, part of 29 Commando Regiment Royal Artillery.

== History ==
The base was first constructed as a naval air station for the Royal Navy's Fleet Air Arm in 1938, when it was known as Royal Naval Air Station Arbroath (RNAS Arbroath; or HMS Condor). It was opened on 19 June 1940. From the outset it was a training base, primarily involved in the training of naval aviators. A purpose-built 'aircraft carrier' sized landing area was constructed on the airfield and it, along with another similar facility at nearby East Haven, Angus, HMS Peewit was used to train aircrew in deck landing operations. In October, 1940, the base was attacked by Luftwaffe Heinkel He 111 bombers, operating from Norway, which resulted in minor damage (then valued at £6,000) being sustained to some Squadron buildings. Throughout the war years the base was additionally used as a rest area. Operational Squadrons from Royal Navy fleet and escort aircraft carriers would take it in turn to spend rest periods whilst their ships were undergoing maintenance at Scottish Naval ship repair facilities.

Flying stopped in 1954 and the base became the home of the Royal Navy Aircraft Engineering Training School which had transferred from HMS Daedalus at Lee-on-Solent, Hampshire. It continued in this role until 1 April 1971 when the base became the home to 45 Commando Royal Marines, a part of 3 Commando Brigade.

The base was thereafter known as RM Condor or Condor Barracks and remains an operational base to this day.

A Better Defence Estate, published in November 2016, indicated that the Ministry of Defence would dispose of the airfield section of RM Condor by 2024. In 2019, this decision was dropped, and the site will remain in use.

=== Units ===
The following units have been based here:

- No. 4 Ferry Flight
- 17th Carrier Air Group
- No. 65 Squadron RAF
- No. 662 Gliding Squadron RAF
- No. 703A Flight
- 735 Naval Air Squadron
- 737 Naval Air Squadron
- 740 Naval Air Squadron
- 741 Naval Air Squadron
- 751 Naval Air Squadron
- 753 Naval Air Squadron
- 754 Naval Air Squadron
- 758 Naval Air Squadron
- 767 Naval Air Squadron
- 768 Naval Air Squadron
- 769 Naval Air Squadron
- 770 Naval Air Squadron
- 771 Naval Air Squadron
- 772 Naval Air Squadron
- 778 Naval Air Squadron
- 783 Naval Air Squadron
- 787 Naval Air Squadron
- 791 Naval Air Squadron
- 800 Naval Air Squadron
- 801 Naval Air Squadron
- 802 Naval Air Squadron
- 803 Naval Air Squadron
- 807 Naval Air Squadron
- 809 Naval Air Squadron
- 810 Naval Air Squadron
- 811 Naval Air Squadron
- 813 Naval Air Squadron
- 814 Naval Air Squadron
- 815 Naval Air Squadron
- 818 Naval Air Squadron
- 819 Naval Air Squadron
- 820 Naval Air Squadron
- 821 Naval Air Squadron
- No. 824A Flight
- 825 Naval Air Squadron
- 826 Naval Air Squadron
- 841 Naval Air Squadron
- 845 Naval Air Squadron
- 846 Naval Air Squadron
- 880 Naval Air Squadron
- 883 Naval Air Squadron
- 885 Naval Air Squadron
- 898 Naval Air Squadron
- 1771 Naval Air Squadron
- Air Engineering School
- M Flight 3 CDO BDE Air Sqn RM

== Based units ==
Units based at RM Condor.

- 45 Commando, Royal Marines
- Royal Marines Police, 30 Commando Information Exploitation Group
- 7 (Sphinx) Battery. 29 Commando Regiment, Royal Artillery
- 2 (City of Dundee and Highland) Squadron, 32 Signals Regiment (Army Reserve)
- Volunteer Cadet Corps

== Cadets ==
The establishment is also home to the Royal Marines Cadets of Arbroath Division Royal Marines Volunteer Cadet Corps.

== Built heritage ==
The redundant airfield control tower is a category C listed building. The three storey building is one of two surviving examples of this particular type of control tower, which features an ambulance and crash tender garage. The tower, which was listed in May 2006, is noted by Historic Environment Scotland as being important in terms of naval and Second World War history, as well as for its local significance.

The Captain's House, formerly known as 'Woodlands', dates from the early 19th century. The two-storey and basement Regency mansion was listed as category B in June 1971.

== See also ==
- Armed forces in Scotland
- Military history of Scotland
- List of air stations of the Royal Navy
