= RNAS Rattray =

Former Royal Naval Air Station in Aberdeenshire, Scotland

RNAS Rattray (HMS Merganser)
- Crimond, Aberdeenshire in Scotland
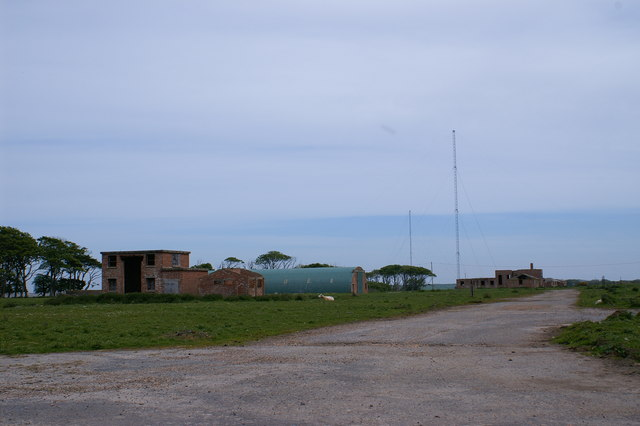
- View of the airfield

Site information
- Type: Royal Naval Air Station
- Owner: Ministry of Defence
- Operator: Royal Navy

Location
- Shown within Aberdeenshire RNAS Rattray (the United Kingdom)
- Coordinates: 57°36′44″N 01°53′01″W

Site history
- Built: March 1943
- In use: July 1943-present

Airfield information
- Elevation: 13 metres (43 ft) AMSL
Runways
Direction	Length and surface
06/24	1,000 metres (3,281 ft) Concrete
11/29	1,000 metres (3,281 ft) Concrete
15/33	900 metres (2,953 ft) Concrete
02/20	900 metres (2,953 ft) Concrete
- Commissioned: 3 October 1944

Royal Navy Air Station Rattray, (RNAS Rattray; or HMS Merganser) and also known as Crimond Airfield, Crimond Aerodrome or Rattray Aerodrome was a Royal Naval Air Station near Crimond, Aberdeenshire.

== History ==
The station started to be built from March 1943, with 774 Naval Air Squadron moving in from July 1943 for Telegraphist Air Gunners training but the site was not commissioned until 3 October 1944.

The base then switched to training Torpedo Bombing Reconnaissance crews.

The following units were here at some point:

- 708 Naval Air Squadron:
- 714 Naval Air Squadron (May 1944-unknown)
- 717 Naval Air Squadron (November 1944-unknown)
- 753 Naval Air Squadron
- 766 Naval Air Squadron
- 769 Naval Air Squadron
- 774 Naval Air Squadron (July 1943-August 1945)
- 815 Naval Air Squadron
- 817 Naval Air Squadron
- 818 Naval Air Squadron
- 821 Naval Air Squadron
- 825 Naval Air Squadron

The base was closed in 1946, being moved into a state of care & maintenance. It was also used as a Royal Naval Wireless Station until 2004.

== Current use ==
The site is home to a high frequency transmitter station forming part of the Defence High Frequency Communications Service. The station is operated by Babcock International Group on behalf of the Ministry of Defence.

== See also ==
- List of air stations of the Royal Navy
