= 717 Naval Air Squadron =

Inactive flying squadron of the Royal Navy's Fleet Air Arm

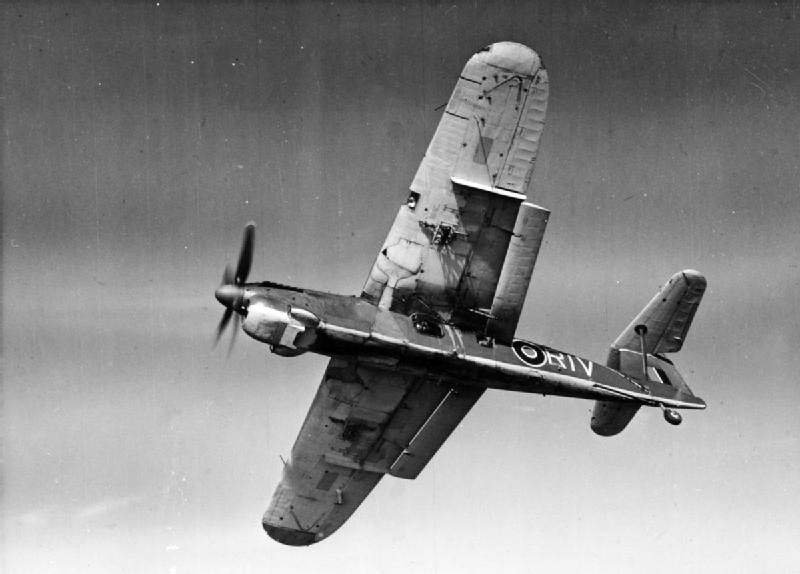
- Fairey Barracuda Mk II of the type used by 717 NAS
- Active: 1944–1946
- Disbanded: 22 March 1946
- Country: United Kingdom
- Branch: Royal Navy
- Type: Fleet Air Arm Second Line Squadron
- Role: Torpedo Bomber Reconnaissance Training Squadron
- Size: Squadron
- Part of: Fleet Air Arm
- Home stations: RNAS Fearn; RNAS Rattray

Commanders
- Notable commanders: Lieutenant Commander(A) A. Brunt, DSC, RNZNVR

Insignia
- Identification Markings: F1A+ & F2A+ (Barracuda); AT3A+ & AT4A+ (October 1944); I1A+ & I2A (from 1945)

Aircraft flown
- Attack: Blackburn Firebrand
- Bomber: Fairey Barracuda

717 Naval Air Squadron (717 NAS) was a Fleet Air Arm (FAA) naval air squadron of the United Kingdom’s Royal Navy (RN) which last disbanded in March 1946. It formed as a Torpedo Bomber Reconnaissance Training Squadron, at HMS Owl, RNAS Fearn, in July 1944, operating with Fairey Barracuda torpedo bomber aircraft. The squadron then moved to HMS Merganser, RNAS Rattray, in the October, continuing in Torpedo Bomber Reconnaissance training. In early 1946 the squadron received Blackburn Firebrand aircraft, with the objective of forming a Firebrand Conversion Unit, but this was never realised.

== History ==
=== Torpedo Bomber Reconnaissance Training Squadron (1944-1946) ===
717 Naval Air Squadron formed at RNAS Fearn (HMS Owl), located 5.4 miles (8.7 km) southeast of Tain, Scottish Highlands, Scotland, as a Torpedo Bomber Reconnaissance Training Squadron, on the 1 July 1944. It was equipped with Fairey Barracuda Mk II aircraft, a British carrier-borne torpedo and dive bomber. The squadron provided specialist training and put together the trainees into accomplished aircrew.

On the 31 October 1944, the squadron relocated to RNAS Rattray (HMS Merganser), situated near Crimond, Aberdeenshire, Scotland. Here it provided training for Part I of the Torpedo Bomber Reconnaissaince course. Twelve months later, in October 1945, it assisted in disbanding both 714 Naval Air Squadron and 769 Naval Air Squadron.

In February 1946, the squadron received T.F. II, T.F. III and T.F. IV variants of the Blackburn Firebrand aircraft, a British single-engine strike fighter, with the intention of forming a Flight as the Firebrand Conversion Unit, however the aircraft were moved on. 717 Naval Air Squadron disbanded on the 22 March 1946.

== Aircraft flown ==
The squadron operated a number of different aircraft types:

- Fairey Barracuda Mk II torpedo and dive bomber (July 1944 - March 1946)
- Blackburn Firebrand T.F. II strike fighter (February 1946 - March 1946)
- Blackburn Firebrand T.F. III strike fighter (February 1946 - March 1946)
- Blackburn Firebrand T.F. IV strike fighter (February 1946 - March 1946)

== Naval air stations ==
717 Naval Air Squadron operated from two naval air stations of the Royal Navy, both in Scotland:

- Royal Naval Air Station Fearn (HMS Owl), Scottish Highlands, (1 July 1946 - 31 October 1944)
- Royal Naval Air Station Rattray (HMS Merganser), Aberdeenshire, (31 October 1944 - 22 March 1945)
- disbanded - (22 March 1946)

== Commanding officers ==
List of commanding officers of 717 Naval Air Squadron with month and year of appointment:

- Lieutenant Commander D. Norcock, RN, from July 1944
- Lieutenant Commander(A) A. Brunt, DSC, RNZNVR, from September 1944
- Lieutenant Commander(A) JL. Fisher, RNVR, from January 1945
- Lieutenant(A) H.H.T. Harding, RNVR, from December 1945
- disbanded - 22 March 1946

Note: Abbreviation (A) signifies Air Branch of the RN or RNVR.
