= Blackburn Shark =

1933 torpedo bomber family by Blackburn

Shark
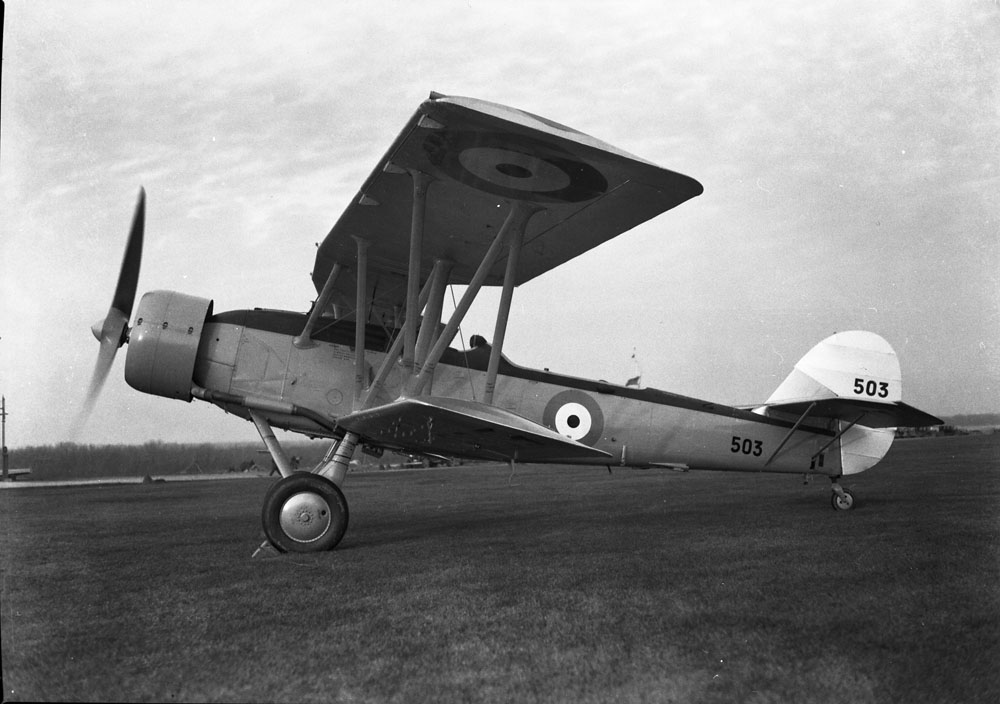
- RCAF Blackburn Shark Mk II

General information
- Type: torpedo-spotter-reconnaissance aircraft
- National origin: United Kingdom
- Manufacturer: Blackburn Aircraft
- Primary users: Royal Navy Royal Air Force; Royal Canadian Air Force; Portuguese Navy
- Number built: 269

History
- Manufactured: 1937–1939
- Introduction date: 1934
- First flight: 24 August 1933
- Retired: 1945

The Blackburn Shark was a carrier-borne torpedo bomber designed and built by the British aviation manufacturer Blackburn Aircraft. It was originally known as the Blackburn T.S.R., standing for "torpedo-spotter-reconnaissance", in reference to its intended roles. The Shark was the last of Blackburn's biplane torpedo bombers.

The prototype Shark performed its maiden flight on 24 August 1933, the first production aircraft was introduced to service during the following year. It was operated by the Fleet Air Arm, Royal Canadian Air Force, Portuguese Navy, and the British Air Observers' School. During the leadup to the 1939 war began the more capable Blackburn Shark was more complex to build so increased production went to its earlier rival the Fairey Swordfish. Despite this, numerous aircraft continued to be operated during the Second World War, largely being confined to secondary roles away from the front lines, such as training and target tug duties. Despite this, Sharks were repeatedly deployed in frontline roles during events such as the Dunkirk Evacuation and the Japanese invasion of British Malaya. During 1945, the final Sharks were withdrawn from service.

== Design and development ==
=== Background ===
The Blackburn T.9 Shark has its origins within the early 1930s as a private venture by the company. Originally known as the Blackburn T.S.R., standing for torpedo-spotter-reconnaissance, it was designed in conformance with Air Ministry Specification S.15/33, which sought a combined torpedo-(naval artillery) spotter-reconnaissance aircraft for the Fleet Air Arm (FAA). Blackburn was not the only company that opted to pursue this requirement; Fairey Aviation designed the TSR 1, a forerunner to the highly successful Fairey Swordfish that was active during the Second World War.

The T.S.R. represented a substantial departure from Blackburn's previous naval aircraft designs, as the design team had opted to eliminate almost all use of streamlined bracing wires in favour of slanted struts. Despite this change, the wings were still foldable to ease stowage; a hydraulic wing-locking mechanism was incorporated to speed up folding/unfolding actions. Further measures to improve deck handling included the adoption of a tracking tail and pneumatic wheel brakes. The design process had been aided by operational experienced gained from the Blackburn Baffin. Features, such as the camber-changing flaps and fuselage construction, were derived from earlier prototypes.

Initially, the design of the T.S.R featured open cockpits, which were heated by an exhaust pipe muff. It had a crew of three, with the pilot seated in the first cockpit while the observer/wireless operator and gunner sharing the second cockpit, although longer range missions would sometimes be flown with only a crew of two. A prone position for bombing missions was also provisioned for, which included a watertight hatch and a hinged course-setting bomb sight. The bomb fusing controls were placed within reach of both the pilot and observer positions; ammunition was stowed in ten ammunition pans within the gunner's cockpit. Armament consisted of one fixed, forward-firing .303 in (7.7 mm) Vickers machine gun, plus a .303 in (7.7 mm) Vickers K machine gun or Lewis Gun mounted on a Scarff ring in the rear cockpit, with provision for a 1,500 lb (680 kg) torpedo or equivalent bombload carried externally.

The fuselage was strengthened to withstand catapult launches and divided into watertight compartments. Structural elements included stainless steel tubular spars and light alloy ribs; similar materials were used for the entire tail section save for the Alclad-plated fin. The majority of the flying surfaces had fabric coverings; the wing tips were detachable as to allow their easy replacement if damaged. The main fuel tanks were not integral to the structure; instead, two detachable tanks composed of duralumin were carried in separate watertight compartments forward of the pilot, housing up to 182.5 gallons of fuel. The aircraft had a range of 623 miles normally, but this could be extended to 1,130 miles via the use of a cylindrical tank, attached to the torpedo crutches, that was capable of holding up to 150 gallons of additional fuel.

=== Into flight ===
On 24 August 1933, Blackburn's B-6 prototype, powered by with a 700 hp (520 kW) Armstrong Siddeley Tiger IV engine, made its maiden flight at Brough. Following the completion of manufacturer trials, during which the engine was enclosed in a long-chord cowling, this prototype was delivered to the Aeroplane and Armament Experimental Establishment (A&AEE) at RAF Martlesham Heath for an official performance evaluation on 26 November 1933. During the following year, after the conclusion of testing at Martlesham, it was transferred to Gosport ahead of deck landing trials on board the aircraft carrier HMS Courageous. These having been deemed successful as well, the prototype was taken up by the Directorate of Technical Development.

During August 1934, Blackburn received an initial production order for 16 aircraft to be produced for the FAA. One month later, limited production had already commenced. During October 1934, the name Shark I was officially sanctioned; around this time, a series of modifications were implemented, the most visible of which was a lengthened engine cowling that enclosed the exhaust collector ring. Amongst the modifications needed was for the aircraft to be convertible to a seaplane configuration, thus the prototype was overhauled and outfitted with twin floats equipped with shock absorbers. In this configuration, early test flights were conducted at Brough during April 1935; a successful series of sea trials took place at the Marine Aircraft Experimental Establishment Felixstowe.

Blackburn was issued contract No. 334315/34 in conjunction with the new Specification 13/35. I, along with the additional contract No. 510994/35 to Specification 19/36, which was issued in January 1937. Even more contracts soon followed, leading to the rate of production exceeding that of numerous preceding Blackburn aircraft. During a three-year production run, a total of 238 Sharks were delivered to the FAA, comprising 16 Mk I (Tiger IV), 126 Mk II (760 hp (570 kW) Tiger VI) and 95 Mk III (760 hp (570 kW) Tiger VI). The Shark III differed from prior models in several respects, the most apparent of which was the addition of a glazed cockpit canopy and three-bladed Rotol wooden propellers. Late on in production, assembly from components produced elsewhere took place at Blackburn's new factory in Dumbarton, Scotland, after which the completed airframes were transported by road to the Clyde at Abbotsinch (now Glasgow Airport) for flight testing.

== Operational history ==
=== Fleet Air Arm ===
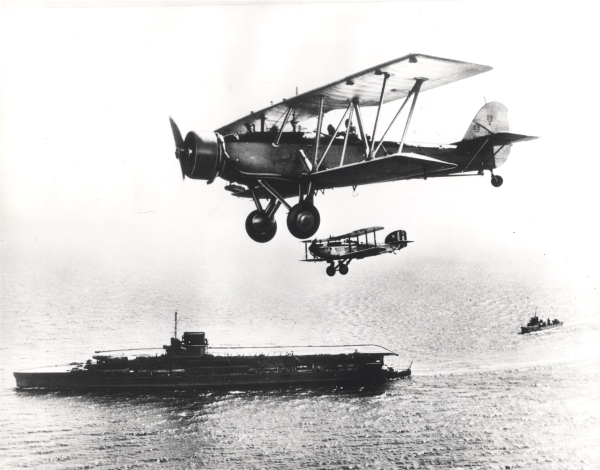
Fleet Air Arm Blackburn Shark in company with a Westland Wapiti, seen flying over HMS Courageous

During May 1935, the Shark entered service with 820 Naval Air Squadron, replacing its Fairey Seals, aboard HMS Courageous. During the following year, it also equipping an additional two squadrons, 810 and 821. The FAA opted to actively deploy the Shark both in its landplane configuration on board the Royal Navy's aircraft carriers and as a seaplane on its battlecruisers, such as HMS Warspite and HMS Repulse; in the latter capacity, it would either be catapult-launched or lowered over the side to take off from the water, dependent on available equipment. Its seaworthiness was a particular point of praise, possessing favourable rough water handling and buoyancy characteristics.

Frontline operations involving the Shark were curtailed after only a relatively short timespan, as the type had started to be replaced by the more capable Fairey Swordfish as early as 1937. However, its value in secondary roles meant that it continued to be operated for numerous years beyond this point; a considerable number of Shark IIs were operated by the B and C training flights at Lee-on-Solent. 20 Sharks were converted by Blackburn into target tugs and saw use at units in Abbotsinch, Gosport, Crail, and Arbroath to help train pilots, starting in 1939. On 4 January 1939, two Sharks were taken up by No. 4 Anti-Aircraft Co-Operation Unit in Seletar, Singapore.

During the Dunkirk evacuation conducted between 26 May and 4 June 1940, numerous Sharks flew across the English Channel to spot and illuminate Kriegsmarine E-boats using flares, they were otherwise unarmed; these operations were hindered and eventually stopped by poor weather conditions. Widespread use of the Shark III for the training of aerial observers and navigators proceeded as far afield as Trinidad; its use in this role continued to as late as 1942.

Numerous Sharks would eventually be based at RAF Seletar as target tugs. During January 1942, the type was used to conduct patrol missions and even bombing raids against units of the Imperial Japanese Army as it advanced into Malaya.

=== Overseas operators ===
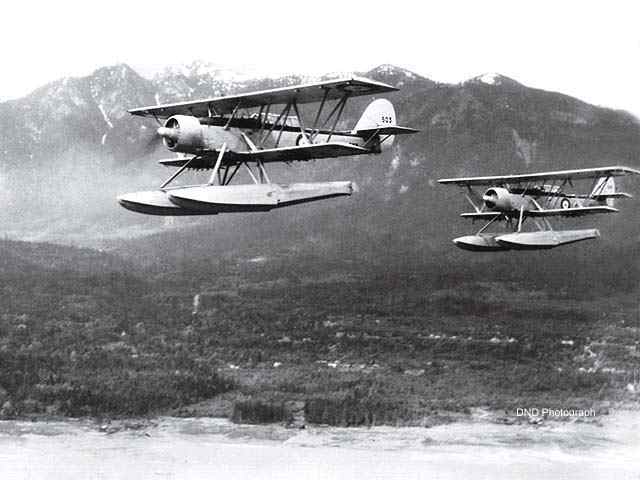
A pair of Canadian Sharks, circa 1940

On 10 April 1935, Blackburn successfully secured a contract over rival firms from the United States, Germany, Czechoslovakia, and Italy valued at £50,000 from the Portuguese government for six seaplanes. Designated Shark IIA, these were largely identical to FAA aircraft, save for being equipped with different armament as some could only be armed with torpedoes. The Portuguese Navy took delivery of them in mid-1936, stationing them at Bom Sucesso (now part of the Lisbon Naval Base) on the River Tagus outside Lisbon for coastal defense. On 22 October 193, a long distance non-stop flight was conducted by a Portuguese Shark between Bom Succeso and RAF Calshot, carrying a diplomatic dispatch to London and returning six days later.

During 1936, the Royal Canadian Air Force (RCAF) purchased seven Blackburn Shark II (760 hp (570 kW) Tiger VI), the first four of which were shipped in September of that year. They were initially flown by No 6 (TB) Squadron, later operating as No 6 (BR) Sqn, on shipping patrols off the Canadian Pacific coast. The type was reportedly appreciated for its ruggedness and ease of maintenance, particularly when operated far from workshops. The Shark was an element of a wider plan to expand Canada's aircraft production and during early 1939, a pair of Shark IIIs (800 hp (600 kW) Pegasus III) were supplied by Blackburn as pattern aircraft for the 17 aircraft produced by Boeing Aircraft of Canada at their Vancouver facility, while their stainless steel spars were provided by Boulton Paul from the UK.

The Canadian-built aircraft were powered by 840 hp (630 kW) Pegasus IX engines and were supplied to Nos 4 and 6 (BR) Squadrons. However, even before quantity manufacturing had been established, it was recognised that the Shark was obsolete and unable to fulfil Canada's requirements. Nevertheless, the aircraft produced were deployed for naval reconnaissance and escorting friendly shipping near Canada. The last of the RCAF's Sharks, some of which were operated as floatplanes, were withdrawn in August 1944, after which five aircraft were transferred to the RN Air Observers' School in Trinidad.

== Variants ==
- B-3 : Torpedo-bomber prototype.
- B-6 : Shark prototype.
- Shark Mk I : Two- or three-seat torpedo bomber, reconnaissance aircraft for the Royal Navy. Powered by a 700 hp (500 kW) Armstrong Siddeley Tiger IV radial piston engine.
- Shark Mk II : Two- or three-seat torpedo bomber, reconnaissance aircraft for the Royal Navy and RCAF. Powered by a 760 hp (570 kW) Armstrong Siddeley Tiger VI radial piston engine.
- Shark Mk IIA : Two- or three-seat torpedo bomber, reconnaissance floatplanes for the Portuguese Navy. Powered by a 760 hp (570 kW) Armstrong Siddeley Tiger VIC radial piston engine. Six built.
- Shark Mk III : Two- or three-seat torpedo bomber, reconnaissance aircraft for the Royal Navy. Fitted with a glazed canopy and dual controls for crew training. Powered by an 800 hp (600 kW) Bristol Pegasus III radial piston engine.

== Operators ==
Canada

- Royal Canadian Air Force
  - No. 4 Squadron RCAF
  - No. 6 Squadron RCAF
  - No. 7 Squadron RCAF
  - No. 111 Squadron RCAF
  - No. 118 Squadron RCAF
  - No. 122 Squadron RCAF

Portugal

- Portuguese Navy - Six aircraft

United Kingdom

- Royal Navy Fleet Air Arm
  - 701 Naval Air Squadron
  - 705 Naval Air Squadron
  - 753 Naval Air Squadron
  - 755 Naval Air Squadron
  - 757 Naval Air Squadron
  - 758 Naval Air Squadron
  - 767 Naval Air Squadron
  - 774 Naval Air Squadron
  - 780 Naval Air Squadron
  - 785 Naval Air Squadron
  - 810 Naval Air Squadron
  - 821 Naval Air Squadron
  - 822 Naval Air Squadron
- Royal Air Force

== Specifications (Shark Mk II) ==
Data from The British Bomber since 1914

General characteristics

- Crew: 3
- Length: 35 ft 3 in (10.74 m)
- Wingspan: 46 ft (14 m)
- Height: 12 ft 1 in (3.68 m)
- Wing area: 489 sq ft (45.4 m^{2})
- Empty weight: 4,039 lb (1,832 kg)
- Gross weight: 8,111 lb (3,679 kg)
- Powerplant: 1 × Armstrong Siddeley Tiger VI 14-cylinder air-cooled radial piston engine, 760 hp (570 kW)
- Propellers: 2-bladed fixed-pitch propeller

Performance

- Maximum speed: 150 mph (240 km/h, 130 kn)
- Cruise speed: 118 mph (190 km/h, 103 kn)
- Range: 625 mi (1,006 km, 543 nmi)
- Endurance: four hours and 54 minutes
- Service ceiling: 15,600 ft (4,800 m)
- Rate of climb: 895 ft/min (4.55 m/s)
- Time to altitude: 6,500 ft (2,000 m) in 7 minutes 6 seconds
- Wing loading: 16.6 lb/sq ft (81 kg/m^{2})
- Power/mass: 0.0937 hp/lb (0.1540 kW/kg)

Armament

- Guns: 1 × fixed forward firing .303 in (7.7 mm) Vickers machine gun and one flexible 0.303 in (7.7 mm) Vickers K machine gun or Lewis gun.
- Bombs: 1 × 18-inch (460 mm) Mark VIII torpedo, 1 × 18-inch (460 mm) Mark X torpedo or 1,600 lb (730 kg) bombs.

== See also ==
Related lists

- List of aircraft of World War II
