= 774 Naval Air Squadron =

Inactive flying squadron of the Royal Navy's Fleet Air Arm

- Active: 1939–1945
- Disbanded: 1 August 1945
- Country: United Kingdom
- Branch: Royal Navy
- Type: Fleet Air Arm Second Line Squadron
- Role: Armament Training Squadron
- Size: Squadron
- Part of: Fleet Air Arm
- Home station: See Naval air stations section for full list.
- Aircraft: See Aircraft operated section for full list.

Insignia
- Identification Markings: O4A+ (all types 1939) single letters (1940 – 1941); S6A+ (1942 – 1944); AT5A+ (1945)

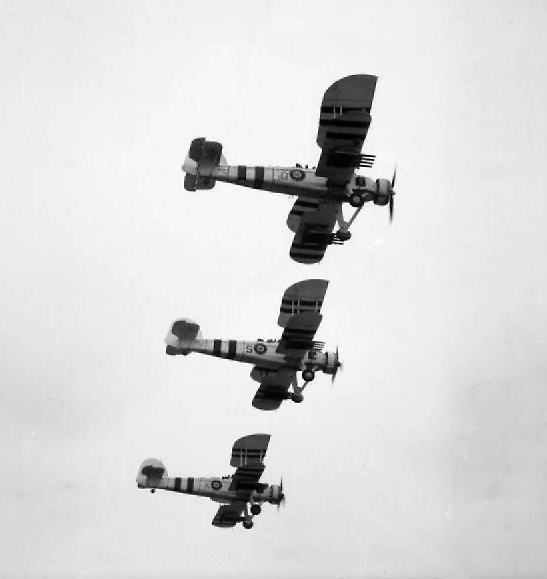
Three rocket-armed Fairey Swordfish of 774 NAS during a training flight from RNAS St. Merryn

774 Naval Air Squadron (774 NAS) was a Fleet Air Arm (FAA) naval air squadron of the United Kingdom’s Royal Navy (RN) which last disbanded in August 1945. 774 Naval Air Squadron formed at HMS Kestrel, RNAS Worthy Down, in November 1939 as an Armament Training Squadron for Observers and TAGs. Aircraft were assigned from storage and a couple of other naval air squadrons. It moved a week later to RAF Aldergrove, and was attached to No.3 Bombing and Gunnery School. In July 1940 it moved to HMS Fieldfare, RNAS Evanton, and then in September to HMS Vulture, RNAS St Merryn, Throughout the next few years, the older aircraft were withdrawn and replaced with newer types and variants. 774 NAS moved to HMS Merganser, RNAS Rattray in October 1944, where it became a target-towing unit.

== History ==
=== Armament Training Squadron (1939–1945) ===
774 Naval Air Squadron formed on 10 November 1939 at RNAS Worthy Down (HMS Kestrel), in Hampshire, England. It was formed as an Armament Training Squadron for Air Observers and Telegraphist Air Gunners. The squadron was equipped with aircraft taken from 815 and 782 Naval Air Squadrons, along with other airframes from storage and the initial number of aircraft consisted three Blackburn Skua, a dive bomber and fighter aircraft, three Blackburn Roc turret fighter aircraft (for turret conversion course), four Blackburn Shark, a torpedo/spotter/reconnaissance aircraft for target tugs and four Fairey Swordfish, a biplane torpedo bomber. Six days later, on 16 November the squadron moved to RAF Aldergrove, in County Antrim, Northern Ireland, as part of No. 3 Bombing and Gunnery School RAF.

On 3 July, 774 Naval Air Squadron relocated to RAF Evanton, in Ross and Cromarty, Scotland and on 17 September, it moved south to RNAS St Merryn (HMS Vulture), in Cornwall, England. Here the squadron received Fairey Albacore, a single-engine biplane torpedo bomber. The following year both the Blackburn Roc and Blackburn Skua were withdrawn from squadron use and during 1942 the Blackburn Shark left. Fairey Barracuda, a British carrier-borne torpedo and dive bomber, arrived in 1943 and replaced both the Fairey Albacore and Fairey Swordfish and the squadron also received some Boulton Paul Defiant target tug variant aircraft along with a number of Hawker Sea Hurricane, a navalised version of the Hawker Hurricane fighter aircraft.

On 24 October 1944, 774 Naval Air Squadron moved to RNAS Rattray (HMS Merganser), Aberdeenshire in Scotland. It became a target-towing unit, and disbanded there on 1 August 1945.

== Aircraft operated ==
The squadron operated a variety of different aircraft and versions:

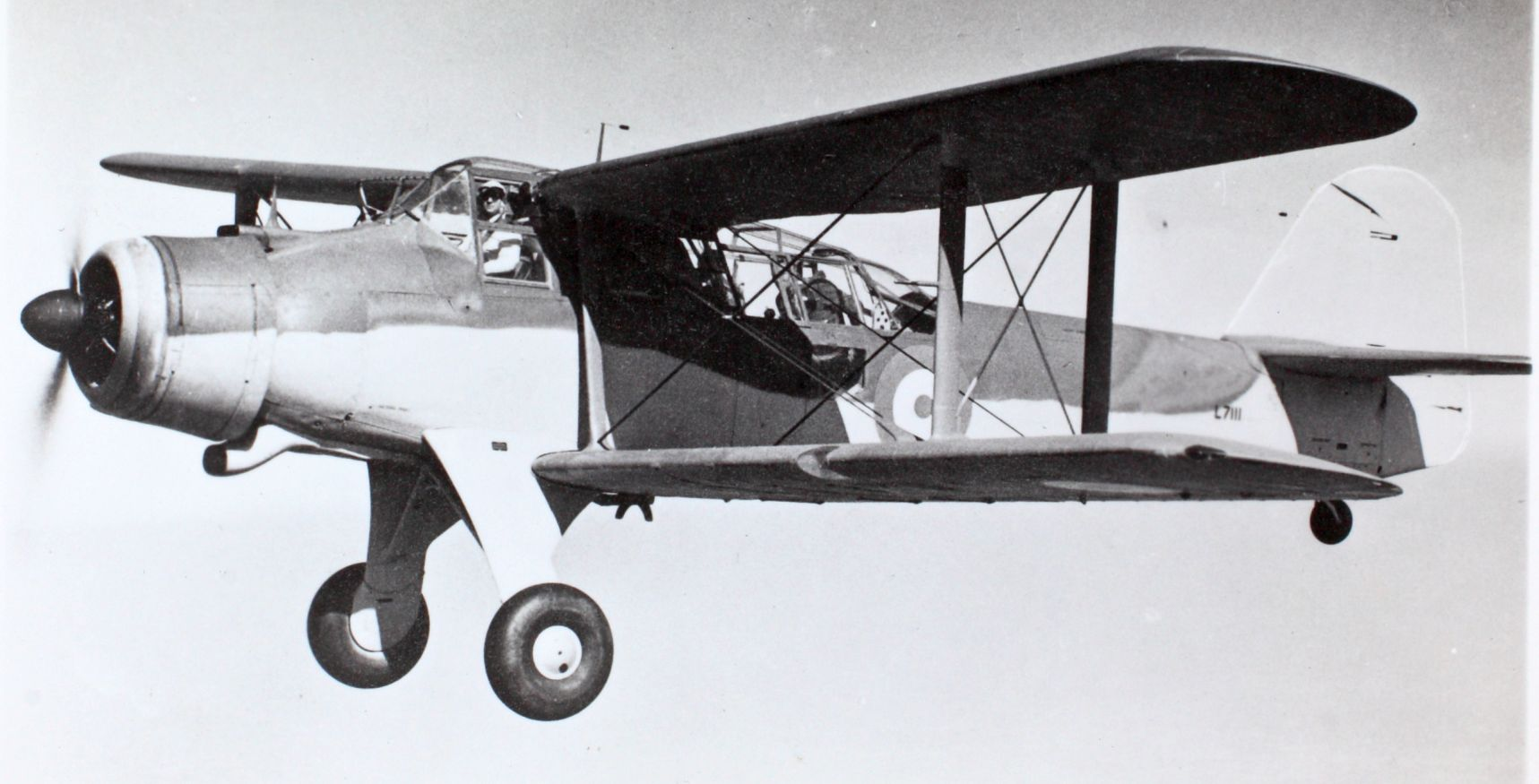
Fairey Albacore

- Blackburn Roc fighter aircraft (November 1939 – January 1941)
- Blackburn Shark Mk II TT torpedo bomber target tug variant (November 1939 – December 1942)
- Blackburn Skua dive bomber and fighter aircraft (November 1939 – January 1941)
- Fairey Swordfish I torpedo bomber (November 1939 – August 1944)
- Fairey Albacore torpedo bomber (September 1940 – June 1944)
- Fairey Swordfish II torpedo bomber (February 1943 – May 1944)
- Fairey Barracuda Mk Il torpedo and dive bomber (February 1944 – July 1945)
- Boulton Paul Defiant TT Mk III dedicated turret-less target tug (November 1944 – March 1945)
- Hawker Hurricane Mk.IIc fighter aircraft (December 1944 – February 1945)
- Hawker Sea Hurricane Mk IB fighter aircraft (June – September 1944)

== Naval air stations ==
774 Naval Air Squadron operated from a number of naval air stations of the Royal Navy, in England:

- Royal Naval Air Station Worthy Down (HMS Kestrel), Hampshire, (10 November 1939 – 16 November 1939)
- Royal Air Force Aldergrove, County Antrim, (16 November 1939 – 3 July 1940)
- Royal Air Force Evanton, Ross and Cromarty, (3 July 1940 – 17 September 1940)
- Royal Naval Air Station St Merryn (HMS Vulture), Cornwall, (17 September 1940 – 24 October 1944)
- Royal Naval Air Station Rattray (HMS Merganser), Aberdeenshire, (24 October 1944 – 1 August 1945)
- disbanded - (1 August 1945)

== Commanding officers ==
List of commanding officers of 774 Naval Air Squadron with date of appointment:

- Lieutenant Commander S. Borrett, RN, from 16 November 1939
- Lieutenant Commander W.G.C. Stokes, RN, from 24 November 1939
- Lieutenant Commander P.L. Mortimer, RN, from 30 August 1940
- Lieutenant Commander(A) J.H. Gibbons, RN, from 15 March 1941
- Lieutenant Commander L. Gilbert, RNVR, from October 1942
- Lieutenant Commander P.P. Pardoe-Matthews, RNR, from 16 August 1943
- Lieutenant(A) J.O. Sparke, RNVR, from 7 October 1944
- disbanded - 1 August 1945

Note: Abbreviation (A) signifies Air Branch of the RN or RNVR.
