= 753 Naval Air Squadron =

Inactive flying squadron of the Royal Navy's Fleet Air Arm

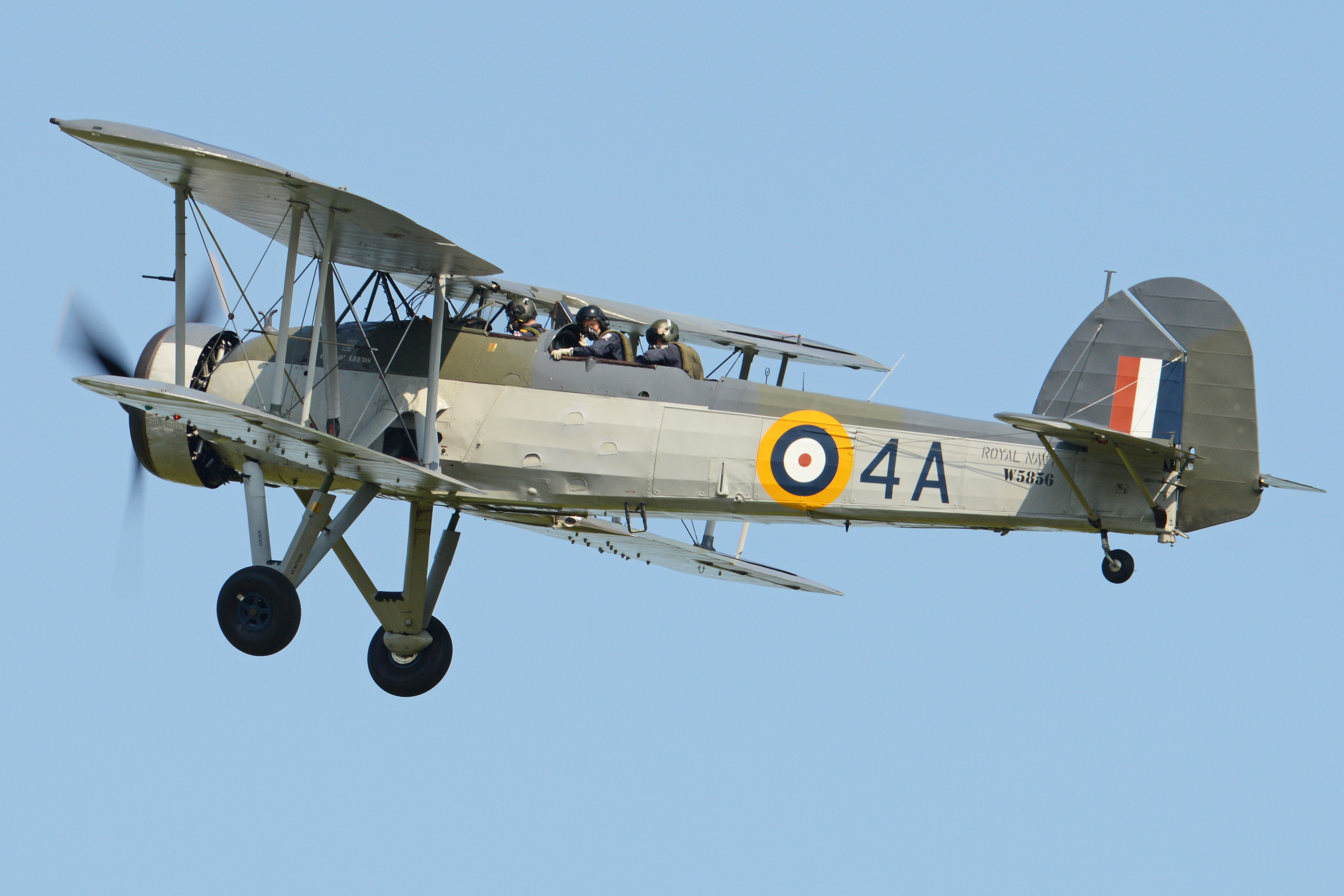
- Fairey Swordfish I, an example of the type used by 753 NAS
- Active: 1939–1946
- Disbanded: 9 August 1946
- Country: United Kingdom
- Branch: Royal Navy
- Type: Fleet Air Arm Second Line Squadron
- Role: Observer Training Squadron
- Size: Squadron
- Part of: Fleet Air Arm
- Home station: See Naval air stations section for full list.

Commanders
- Notable commanders: Commander G.N.P. Stringer, OBE, DFC, RN

Insignia
- Identification Markings: W4A+; A4A+ to A7A+ (February 1943)

Aircraft flown
- Attack: Blackburn Shark; Fairey Swordfish; Fairey Albacore; Fairey Barracuda
- Fighter: Hawker Nimrod
- Patrol: Fairey Seal

753 Naval Air Squadron (753 NAS), also referred to as 753 Squadron, is an inactive Fleet Air Arm (FAA) naval air squadron of the United Kingdom's Royal Navy (RN). It last operated Fairey Barracuda Mk II torpedo and dive bomber and was previously active as an Observer Training Squadron between 1939 and 1946, as part of No. 2 Observer School, forming out of the School of Naval Co-operation RAF in May 1939.

It was initially based at RNAS Lee-on-Solent (HMS Daedalus), Hampshire, but the squadron moved to RNAS Arbroath (HMS Condor), Angus, just over one year later in August 1940, following a German bombing attack on the air station. The squadron spent four years operating out of Arbroath, before relocating again, this time to RNAS Rattray (HMS Merganser), Aberdeenshire, where the squadron disbanded in August 1946.

== History ==
=== Observer Training Squadron (1939-1946) ===
753 Naval Air Squadron formed at RNAS Lee-on-Solent (HMS Daedalus), situated near Lee-on-the-Solent in Hampshire, approximately four miles west of Portsmouth, on 24 May 1939 as an Observer Training Squadron and being part of No.2 Observer School. It was initially equipped with Blackburn Shark Mk II, a biplane torpedo bomber and Fairey Seal spotter-reconnaissance aircraft. In the following December the squadron then acquired Fairey Swordfish I, another torpedo bomber.

753 Naval Air Squadron moved to RNAS Arbroath (HMS Condor), located near Arbroath in East Angus, Scotland, on 19 August 1940. Discarding the Fairey Seal, but keeping the Blackburn Shark Mk II and the Fairey Swordfish I during the move, the squadron then also operated Fairey Albacore Mk I, a biplane torpedo bomber, from August 1941, which was soon followed by de Havilland Tiger Moth in the December. In November 1943 Stinson Reliant I was received and was used by the squadron for almost one year, up until September 1944. Lastly, from December 1944, the squadron operated Fairey Barracuda Mk II up until disbandment.

On the 1 November 1945, 753 Naval Air Squadron left RNAS Arbroath and moved to RNAS Rattray (HMS Merganser), near Crimond, Aberdeenshire. The squadron remained at the base, operating Fairey Barracuda, until disbanding on 9 August 1946.

== Aircraft operated ==
753 Naval Air Squadron has operated a small number of different aircraft types, including:

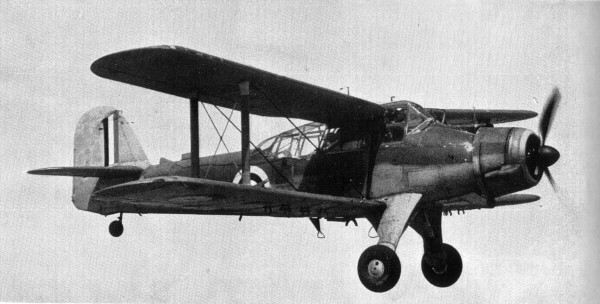
Fairey Albacore

- Blackburn Shark Mk II torpedo bomber (May 1939 - January 1942)
- Fairey Seal spotter-reconnaissance aircraft (May 1939 - March 1941)
- Hawker Nimrod fighter aircraft (September 1939 - May 1940)
- Fairey Swordfish I torpedo bomber (August 1941 - June 1945)
- Fairey Albacore Mk I torpedo bomber (August 1941 - December 1944)
- Fairey Barracuda Mk II torpedo and dive bomber (December 1944 - August 1946)

== Naval air stations ==
753 Naval Air Squadron operated from a number of naval air stations of the Royal Navy, in Scotland and England:

- Royal Naval Air Station Lee-on-Solent (HMS Daedalus), Hampshire, (24 May 1939 - 23 August 1940)
- Royal Naval Air Station Arbroath (HMS Condor), Angus, (23 August 1940 - 1 November 1945)
- Royal Naval Air Station Rattray (HMS Merganser), Aberdeenshire, (1 November 1945 - 10 August 1946)
- disbanded (10 August 1946)

== Commanding officers ==
List of commanding officers of 753 Naval Air Squadron with date of appointment:

- Lieutenant Commander G.N.P. Stringer, DFC, RN, from 24 May 1939
- Captain A.C. Newson, RM, from 22 October 1940
- Lieutenant Commander(A) L.A. Cubitt, RN, from 6 May 1941
- Lieutenant Commander(A) A.C. Mills, RNVR, from 30 September 1941
- Lieutenant Commander(A) F.R. Steggall, RNVR, from 15 July 1942
- Lieutenant Commander(A) R.E. Stewart, RNVR, from 31 March 1944
- Lieutenant Commander(A) A.J. Phillips, RN, from 12 August 1945
- disbanded - 10 August 1946

Note: Abbreviation (A) signifies Air Branch of the RN or RNVR.
