= 818 Naval Air Squadron =

Inactive flying squadron of the Royal Navy's Fleet Air Arm

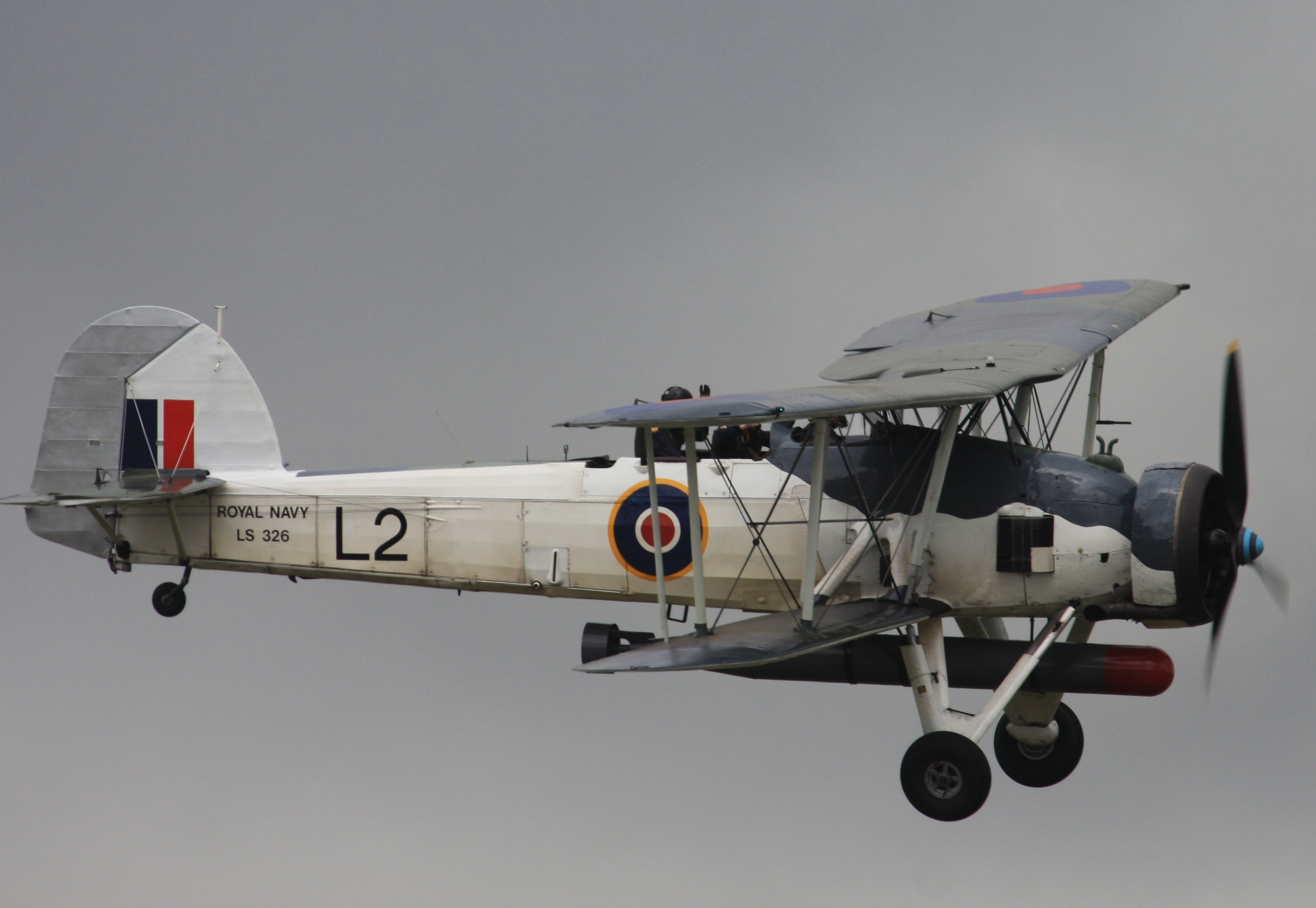
- Fairey Swordfish II; an example of the type used by 818 NAS
- Active: 1939–1942; 1942–1944; 1945
- Disbanded: 15 August 1945
- Country: United Kingdom
- Branch: Royal Navy
- Type: Torpedo Bomber Reconnaissance squadron
- Role: Carrier-based: anti-submarine warfare (ASW); anti-surface warfare (ASuW)
- Part of: Fleet Air Arm
- Home station: See Naval air stations section for full list.
- Mottos: Sine mora (Latin for 'Without delay')
- Battle honours: Norway 1940; Narvik 1940; English Channel 1940; Spartivento 1940; Mediterranean 1940-41; Atlantic 1941; "Bismarck" 1941

Commanders
- Notable commanders: Lieutenant Commander T.P. Coode, RN

Insignia
- Squadron badge
- Squadron Badge Description: A splayed red hand on a black swastika (Submitted in 1943; however, it was not approved because it contained a Swastika)
- Identification Markings: U3A+ (Swordfish); A5+ (Swordfish June 1940); 4A+ (Albacore); 1A+ (Swordfish October 1942); 8A+ (Barracuda)

Aircraft flown
- Bomber: Fairey Swordfish; Fairey Albacore; Fairey Barracuda

818 Naval Air Squadron (818 NAS), also referred to as 818 Squadron, is an inactive Fleet Air Arm (FAA) naval air squadron of the United Kingdom’s Royal Navy (RN). It last operated with Fairey Barracuda torpedo and dive bomber.

It served on a number of the Royal Navy's aircraft carriers during the Second World War and served in most of the theatres of that war. It initially used Fairey Swordfish and Fairey Albacore torpedo bombers. The squadron decommissioning at the end of the war.

== History ==
=== Formation ===
818 Naval Air Squadron was initially scheduled to be established at RNAS Lee-on-Solent (HMS Daedalus), Hampshire, on 1 October 1939, equipped with twelve Fairey Swordfish biplane torpedo bomber aircraft, designated for Torpedo Spotter Reconnaissance operations aboard the aircraft carrier HMS Hermes. However, the impending war led to a revision of these plans, accelerating their implementation. Therefore, 818 Squadron was formed as a Torpedo Spotter Reconnaissance squadron at RAF Evanton in August 1939. The squadron was initially equipped with nine Fairey Swordfish I torpedo bombers, and then embarked in the aircraft carrier HMS Ark Royal at the Royal Navy's base at Scapa Flow.

=== Norway and the English Channel ===
HMS Ark Royal was then deployed to search for enemy shipping off Norway. 818 Squadron transferred to HMS Furious in April 1940, after the German invasion of Norway. On 11 April aircraft from the squadron attacked two German destroyers in Trondheim Fjord.

The squadron then moved ashore, spending the period between May and June 1940 flying out of Thorney and RAF Carew Cheriton, working with RAF Coastal Command in the English Channel.

=== Mediterranean ===
They returned to Ark Royal in mid-June, and sailed with her to the Mediterranean Sea. They were used in the Attack on Mers-el-Kébir, carrying out strikes against the Vichy-French battleship Strasbourg. They again saw action in attacks on Italian targets on Sicily, and in the Battle of Cape Spartivento, with attacks on the Italian battleship Littorio on 27 November 1940. They were also involved in providing air cover for the Malta Convoys, and in February 1941 carried out attacks on targets at Livorno, Genoa, Pisa and La Spezia.

=== Hunting the battleship Bismarck ===
The breakout into the Atlantic of the German battleship Bismarck in May 1941 led to HMS Ark Royal being ordered into the Atlantic with the British fleet to hunt and sink the German ship. When the Bismarck was located, aircraft from 810 and 818 Naval Air Squadrons carried out attacks. Eventually a Fairey Swordfish of 818 Squadron, probably the one piloted by Sub-Lieutenant John Moffat, struck Bismarck's aft with a torpedo, jamming her rudder in a turn to starboard. Unable to manoeuvre, the Bismarck swung around in a wide circle, allowing the ships of Force H to catch up and sink the German ship.

=== The Mediterranean and Far East ===
The squadron later had their Swordfish replaced by nine Fairey Albacore I and they were embarked aboard HMS Formidable in February 1942. The aircraft carrier then sailed to Ceylon to counter Japanese attacks, but by June a reduction in the threat of such attacks led to the squadron being disbanded.

On 19 October 1942, 818 squadron was reformed at RNAS Lee-on-Solent (HMS Daedalus), Hampshire, with six Fairey Swordfish IIs, which increased to nine aircraft just prior to their embarkation in HMS Unicorn in March 1943. HMS Unicorn provided escort for convoys traveling to and from Gibraltar during May and June, and again in August, when the squadron was disembarked to Gibraltar for local patrols and convoy escort duties for a month in support of the Salerno operation.

Six aircraft were disembarked at Gibraltar in August 1943, with a portion of the squadron establishing the new 838 Naval Air Squadron. The remaining aircraft proceeded to Ceylon aboard HMS Unicorn, arriving in February 1944. The unit was disbanded at the RN Air Section at RAF Cochin, Southern India, on 14 October 1944.

=== Barracuda Mk II (1945) ===
They were again reformed, this time at RNAS Rattray (HMS Merganser), Aberdeenshire, in May 1945, and equipped with eighteen Barracuda MK II, to operate as a torpedo bomber reconnaissance squadron. This variant of Fairey Barracuda had its inaugural flight on 17 August 1942 and was equipped with a 1,640 hp Rolls-Royce Merlin 32 engine and featured a four-blade propeller. In June, it relocated to RNAS Fearn (HMS Owl), Ross-shire, to proceed with its work-up. The squadron was slated to join the 22nd Carrier Air Group aboard a Colossus-class aircraft carrier. However, shortly after returning to RNAS Rattray at the start of September, it was disbanded retroactively effective from V-J Day, 15 August.

== Aircraft flown ==
The squadron has flown a number of different aircraft types, including:

- Fairey Swordfish I torpedo bomber (August 1939 - November 1941)
- Fairey Albacore torpedo bomber (November 1941 - June 1942)
- Fairey Swordfish II torpedo bomber (October 1942 - October 1944)
- Fairey Barracuda Mk II torpedo and dive bomber (May - August 1945)

== Battle honours ==
The battle honours awarded to 818 Naval Air Squadron are:

- Norway 1940
- Narvik 1940
- English Channel 1940
- Spartivento 1940
- Mediterranean 1940-41
- Atlantic 1941
- "Bismarck" 1941

== Naval air stations ==
818 Naval Air Squadron was active at various naval air stations of the Royal Navy and Royal Air Force stations, both within the United Kingdom and internationally. Additionally, it operated from a number of Royal Navy fleet carriers and an escort carriers.

=== World War Two air stations and aircraft carriers ===
List of air stations and aircraft carriers used by 818 Naval Air Squadron during World War two including dates:

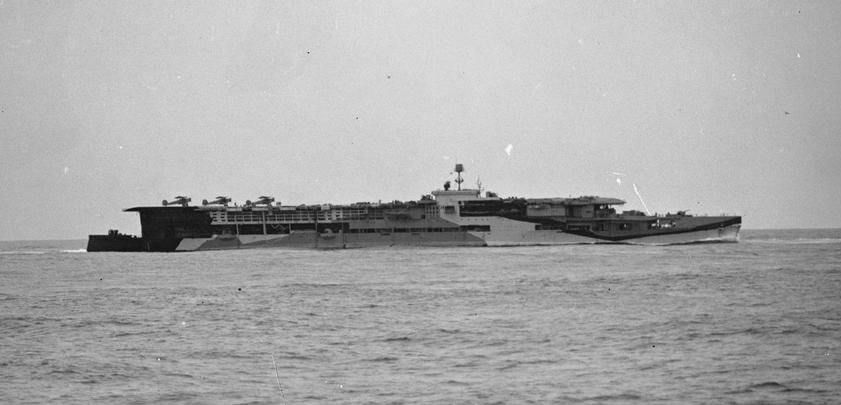
HMS Furious

1939 - 1942

- Royal Naval Air Station Donibristle (HMS Merlin), Fife, (24 - 30 August 1939)
- Royal Naval Air Station Evanton, Ross and Cromarty, (30 - 321 August 1939)
- HMS Ark Royal (31 August - 21 September 1939)
- Royal Naval Air Station Hatston (HMS Sparrowhawk), Mainland, Orkney, (21 - 23 September 1939)
- HMS Ark Royal (23 September - 1 October 1939)
- Royal Naval Air Station Hatston (HMS Sparrowhawk), Mainland, Orkney, (1 October - 17 December 1939)
  - HMS Furious (Detachment three aircraft 23 October - 17 December 1939)
- Royal Naval Air Station Abbotsinch (HMS Sanderling), Renfrewshire, (17 - 25 December 1939)
- HMS Furious (25 December 1939 – 16 February 1940)
- Royal Naval Air Station Campbeltown, Argyll and Bute, (16 February - 4 April 1940)
- HMS Furious (4 - 27 April 1940)
- Royal Naval Air Station Hatston (HMS Sparrowhawk), Mainland, Orkney, (27 April - 26 May 1940)
  - HMS Furious (Detachment nine aircraft 12 - 26 May 1940)
- Royal Naval Air Station Campbeltown, Argyll and Bute, (26 - 30 May 1940)
- Royal Air Force Thorney Island, West Sussex, (30 May - 14 June 1940)
- Royal Air Force Carew Cheriton, Pembrokeshire, (14 - 18 June 1940)
- HMS Ark Royal (18 June - 7 October 1940)
- Royal Naval Air Station Campbeltown, Argyll and Bute, (7 - 29 October 1940)
- HMS Ark Royal (29 October 1940 – 17 January 1941)
- RN Air Section Gibraltar, Gibraltar, (17 - 28 January 1941)
- HMS Ark Royal (28 January - 1 July 1941)
- HMS Furious (1 - 12 July 1941)
- Royal Naval Air Station Arbroath (HMS Condor), Angus, (12 - 28 July 1941)
- Royal Naval Air Station Twatt (HMS Tern), Mainland, Orkney, (28 July - 12 August 1941)
- Royal Naval Air Station Machrihanish (HMS Landrail), Argyll and Bute, (12 August 1941 – 18 January 1942)
  - HMS Argus (Detachment two aircraft 25 September - 26 October 1941)
  - HMS Argus (Detachment two 29 October - 15 November 1941)
- Royal Naval Air Station Hatston (HMS Sparrowhawk), Mainland, Orkney, (18 - 28 January 1942)
- Royal Naval Air Station Machrihanish (HMS Landrail), Argyll and Bute, (28 January - 4 February 1942)
- HMS Formidable (4 February - 13 April 1942)
- RN Air Section Juhu, India, (13 - 20 April 1942)
- HMS Formidable (20 - 28 April 1942)
- RN Air Section Ratmalana, Ceylon, (28 April - 9 May 1942)
- Royal Naval Air Station Katukurunda (HMS Ukussa), Ceylon, (9 May - 24 June 1942)
- disbanded - (24 June 1942)

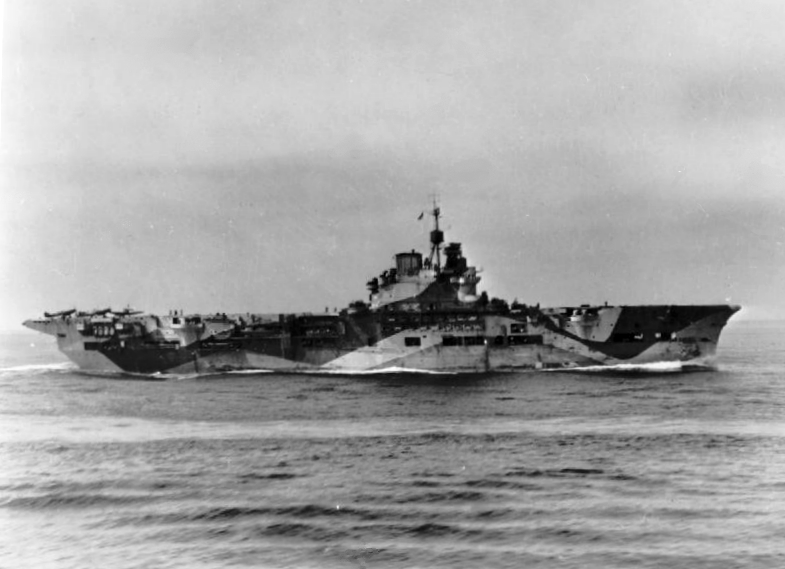
HMS Unicorn

1942 - 1944

- Royal Naval Air Station Lee-on-Solent (HMS Daedalus), Hampshire, (19 October - 17 November 1942)
- Royal Naval Air Station Machrihanish (HMS Landrail), Argyll and Bute, (17 November - 2 December 1942)
- Royal Air Force Kirkistown, County Down, (2 - 18 December 1942)
- Royal Naval Air Station Machrihanish (HMS Landrail), Argyll and Bute, (18 December 1942 – 24 March 1943)
- HMS Unicorn (24 March - 5 June 1943)
- Royal Naval Air Station Machrihanish (HMS Landrail), Argyll and Bute, (5 June - 13 August 1943)
  - Royal Naval Air Station Belfast (HMS Gadwall), County Antrim, (Detachment four aircraft 28 June - 11 July 1943)
- HMS Unicorn (13 - 28 August 1943)
- RN Air Section Gibraltar, Gibraltar, (28 August - 30 September 1943)
- HMS Unicorn (30 September - 13 October 1943)
- Royal Naval Air Station Belfast (HMS Gadwall), County Antrim, (13 October - 20 November 1943)
- Royal Naval Air Station Machrihanish (HMS Landrail), Argyll and Bute, (20 - 22 November 1943)
- HMS Unicorn (22 November 1943 – 5 February 1944)
- RN Air Section China Bay, Ceylon, (5 February - 29 April 1944)
  - RN Air Section Juhu, India, (Detachment two aircraft 20 March - 6 April 1944)
- HMS Unicorn (29 April - 23 August 1944)
  - RN Air Section Juhu, India, (Detachment two aircraft 7 - 19 May 1944)
- HMS Atheling (23 August - 12 September 1944)
- Royal Naval Air Station Wingfield (HMS Malagas), South Africa, (12 - 18 September 1944)
- HMS Atheling (18 September - 6 October 1944)
- RN Air Section Cochin, India, (6 - 14 October 1944)
- disbanded - (14 October 1944)

1945

- Royal Naval Air Station Rattray (HMS Merganser), Aberdeenshire, (1 May - 26 June 1945)
- Royal Naval Air Station Fearn (HMS Owl), Ross-shire, (26 June - 15 August 1945)
- disbanded - (15 August 1945)

== Commanding officers ==
List of commanding officers of 818 Naval Air Squadron:

1939 - 1942

- Lieutenant Commander J.E. Fenton, RN, from 30 August 1939
- Lieutenant Commander P.G.O. Sydney-Turner, RN, from 19 March 1940
- Lieutenant Commander T.P. Coode, RN, from 24 October 1940
- Lieutenant Commander T.W.B. Shaw, DSC, RN, from 28 July 1941
- disbanded - 24 June 1942

1942 - 1944

- Lieutenant Commander A.H. Abrams, DSC, RN, from 22 October 1942
- Lieutenant Commander(A) W.H. Lloyd, RNVR, from 7 July 1943
- disbanded - 14 October 1944

1945

- Lieutenant Commander(A) B.W. Vigrass, RNVR, from 1 May 1945
- disbanded - 15 August 1945

Note: Abbreviation (A) signifies Air Branch of the RN or RNVR.

== See also ==
- Attack on Mers-el-Kébir - 1940 British naval attack on the French Navy
