= 769 Naval Air Squadron =

Inactive flying squadron of the Royal Navy's Fleet Air Arm

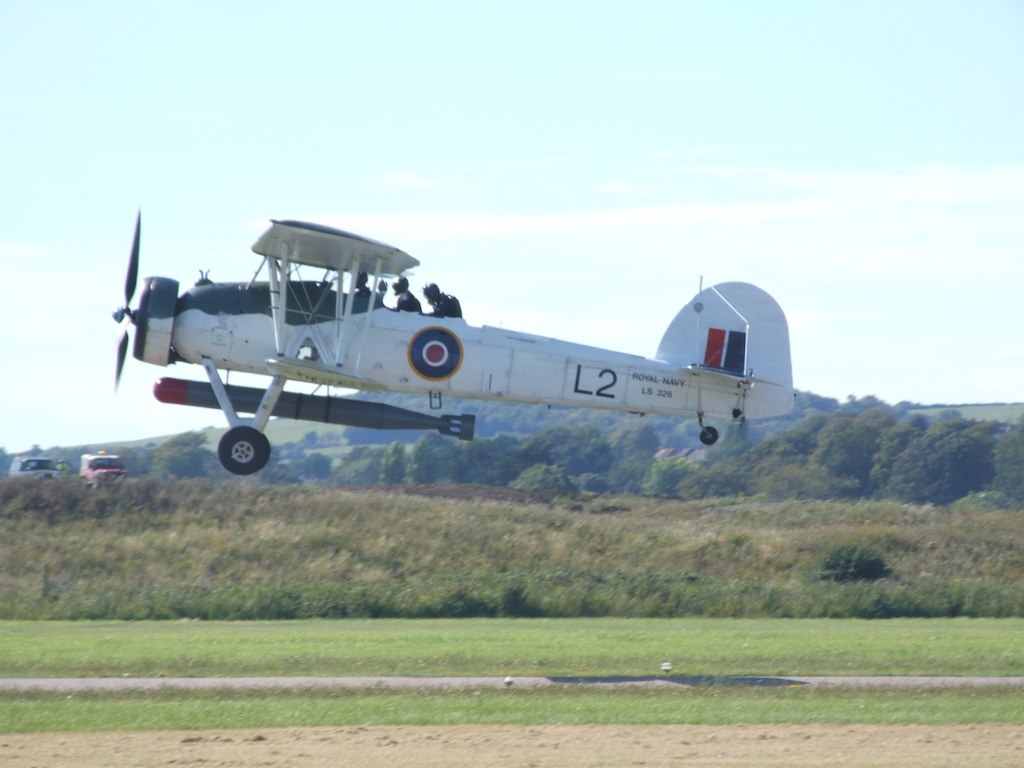
- A Fairey Swordfish, an example of the type used by 769 NAS
- Active: 1939; 1941–1945
- Disbanded: 29 October 1945
- Country: United Kingdom
- Branch: Royal Navy
- Type: Fleet Air Arm Second Line Squadron
- Role: Deck Landing Training Squadron; Torpedo Bomber Reconnaissance Training Squadron
- Size: Squadron
- Part of: Fleet Air Arm
- Home station: See Naval air stations section for full list.
- Aircraft: See Aircraft operated section for full list.

Insignia
- Identification Markings: T6A+ (all types 1939) individual letters (Swordfish 1941-1943) individual numbers (Albacore 1941-1943); E3A+ and E4A+(all types 1943-1945); I4A+, I5A+ and I6A+ (Barracuda 1945)

769 Naval Air Squadron (769 NAS) was a Fleet Air Arm (FAA) naval air squadron of the United Kingdom’s Royal Navy (RN). It last disbanded and merged with 717 Naval Air Squadron after the Second World War. 769 Naval Air Squadron Formed at HMS Merlin, RNAS Donibristle, during May 1939, by renumbering 801 Naval Air Squadron. Its role was a fighter Deck Landing Training Squadron, using HMS Furious for advanced training, before disbanding in the December. It reformed in November 1941, as a unit within the Deck Landing Training School at HMS Condor, RNAS Arbroath, and in November 1943, it moved to HMS Peewit, RNAS East Haven. Its role changed to Torpedo Bomber Reconnaissance Training in 1944, before moving to HMS Merganser, RNAS Rattray, in July 1945.

== History ==
=== Deck Landing Training Squadron (1939) ===
769 Naval Air Squadron formed at RNAS Donibristle (HMS Merlin), Fife, Scotland, on 24 May 1939 as a fighter Deck Landing Training squadron, by renumbering 801 Naval Air Squadron. It was equipped with Gloster Sea Gladiator, a biplane fighter aircraft, Blackburn Skua, a dive bomber and fighter aircraft and Blackburn Roc, a naval turret fighter aircraft. Advanced deck landing training was done using the modified Courageous-class battlecruiser to an aircraft carrier HMS Furious. On 24 November 804 Naval Air Squadron was formed using four of 769’s Gloster Sea Gladiator aircraft and on 1 December 769 Naval Air Squadron disbanded.

=== Deck Landing Training Squadron (1941–1944) ===
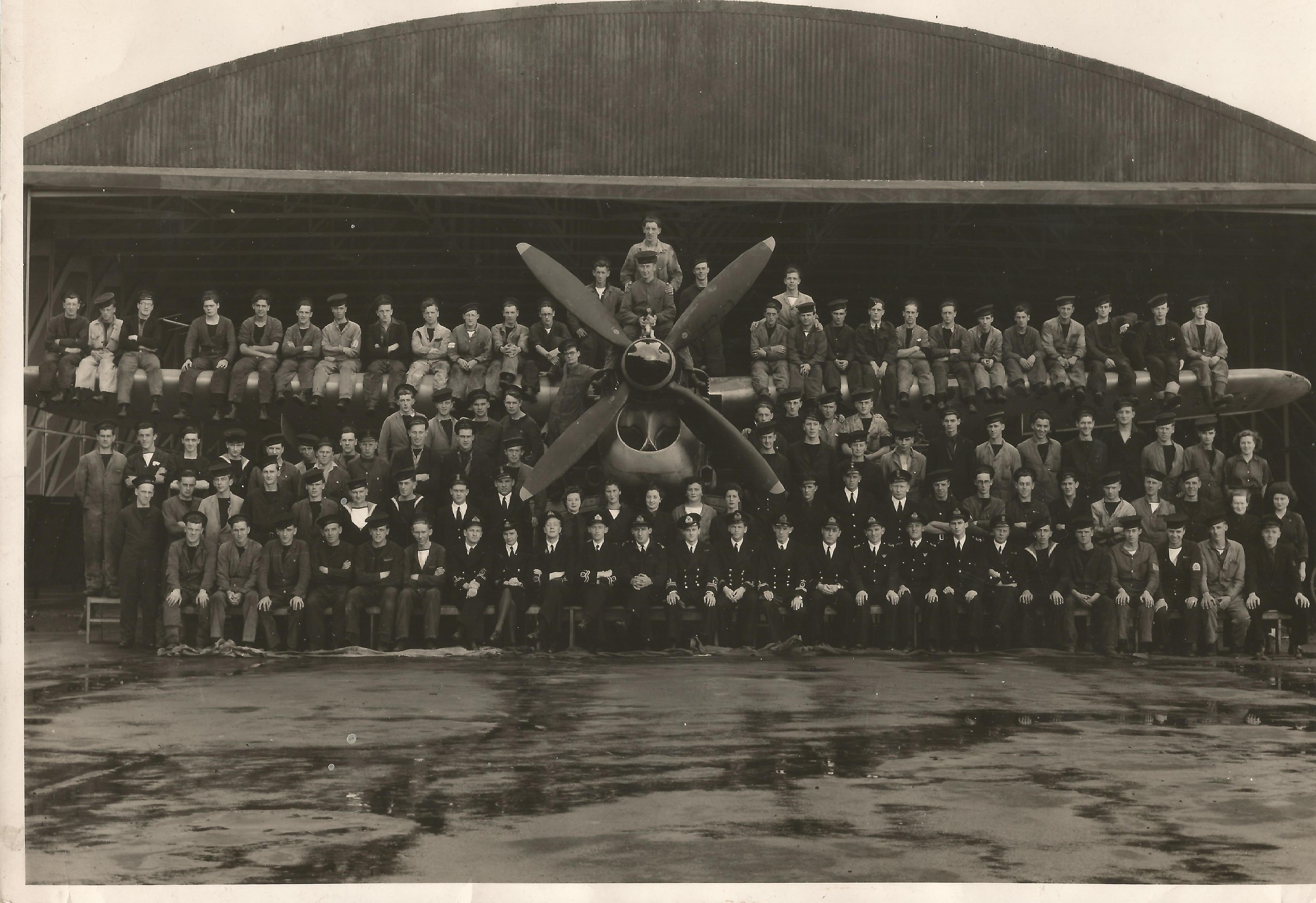
769 Naval Air Squadron muster HMS Peewit

On 29 November 1941, 769 Naval Air Squadron reformed as a Deck Landing Training squadron within the Deck Landing Training School at RNAS Arbroath (HMS Condor). It operated with Fairey Swordfish and Fairey Albacore, both biplane torpedo bomber aircraft. The squadron received Fairey Barracuda, a dive and torpedo bomber, when it relocated to RNAS East Haven (HMS Peewit), Angus, Scotland, on 7 November 1943. Here it also ran a deck landing training course for officers until the course moved to 731 Naval Air Squadron on 5 December.

=== Torpedo, Bomber and Reconnaissance Training (1944–1945) ===
769 Naval Air Squadron changed its role to Torpedo Bomber Reconnaissance (TBR) training during 1944. It moved to RNAS Rattray (HMS Merganser), Aberdeenshire, Scotland, on 28 July 1945. The intention was to expand the TBR school at HMS Merganser, however, due to V-J Day, it was no longer required and 769 Naval Air Squadron disbanded and was absorbed into 717 Naval Air Squadron, on 29 October 1945.

== Aircraft operated ==
The squadron operated a variety of different aircraft and versions:

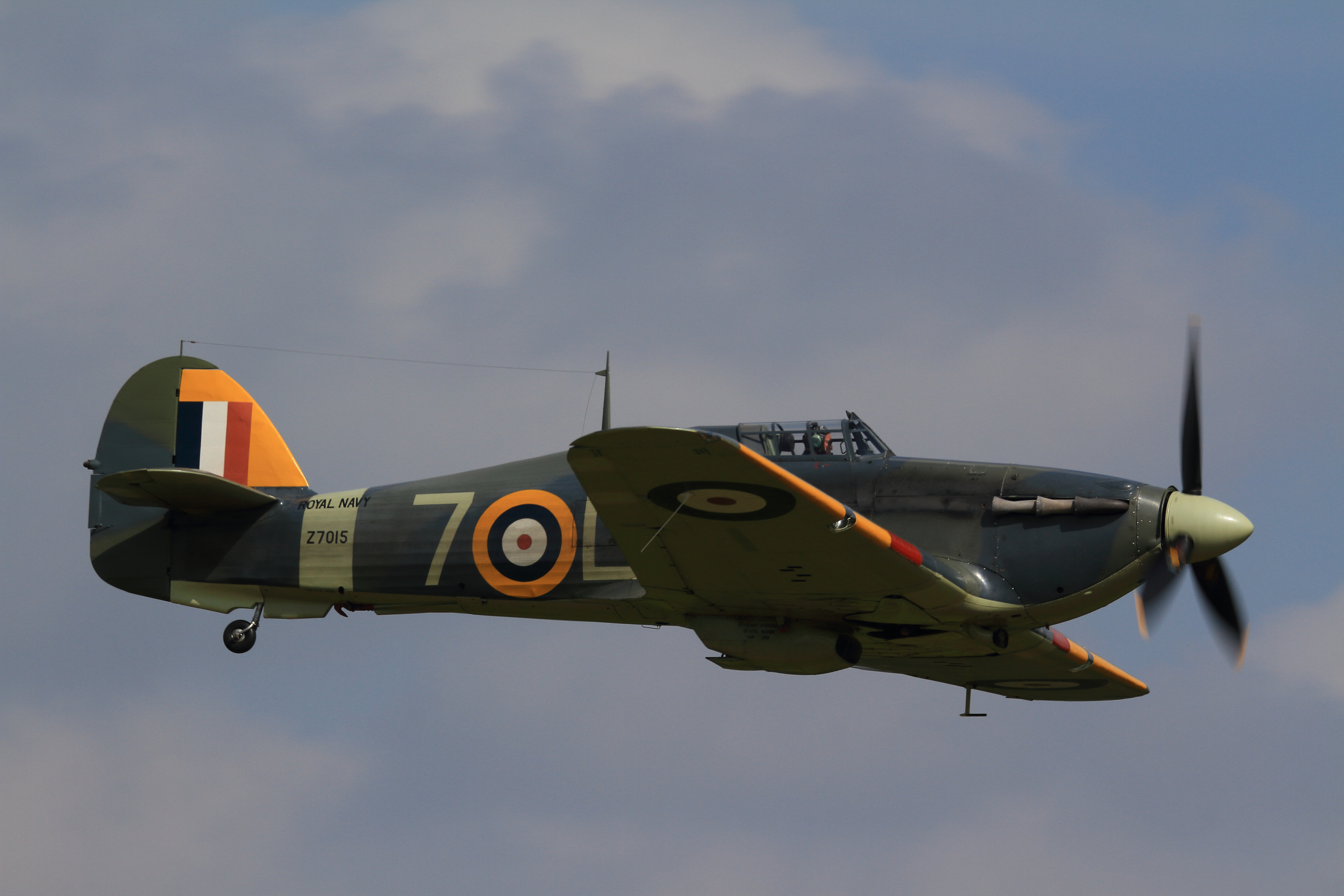
Hawker Sea Hurricane Mk IB

- Blackburn Skua dive bomber and fighter aircraft (May - November 1939)
- Gloster Sea Gladiator fighter aircraft (May - November 1939, July 1942 - October 1943)
- de Havilland DH.60 Moth DH.60M Metal Moth trainer aircraft (July 1939 - April 1940)
- Blackburn Roc fighter aircraft (August - November 1939)
- de Havilland Tiger Moth trainer aircraft (November 1941 - August 1942)
- Fairey Fulmar Mk.I reconnaissance/fighter aircraft (November 1941 - September 1942)
- Fairey Swordfish I torpedo bomber (November 1941 - February 1944)
- Fairey Albacore torpedo bomber (November 1941 - February 1944)
- Hawker Sea Hurricane Mk IB fighter aircraft (March 1942 - April 1944)
- Fairey Fulmar Mk.II reconnaissance/fighter aircraft (December 1942 - December 1943)
- Fairey Swordfish II torpedo bomber (October 1943 - February 1944)
- Fairey Barracuda Mk II torpedo and dive bomber (November 1943 - October 1945)
- Fairey Barracuda Mk III torpedo and dive bomber (August - October 1945)

== Naval air stations ==
769 Naval Air Squadron operated from a number of naval air station of the Royal Navy, in the United Kingdom:

1939

- Royal Naval Air Station Donibristle (HMS Merlin), Fife, (24 May 1939 - 1 December 1939)
- disbanded - (1 December 1939)

1941 - 1945

- Royal Naval Air Station Arbroath (HMS Condor), Angus, (29 November 1941 - 7 November 1943)
- Royal Naval Air Station East Haven (HMS Peewit), Angus, (7 November 1943 - 28 July 1945)
- Royal Naval Air Station Rattray (HMS Merganser), Aberdeenshire, (28 July 1945 - 29 October 1945)
- disbanded (29 October 1945)

== Commanding officers ==
List of commanding officers of 769 Naval Air Squadron with date of appointment:

1939

- Lieutenant Commander C.A. Kingsley-Rowe, RN, from 24 May 1939
- disbanded - 1 December 1939

1941 - 1945

- Lieutenant W.H. Crawford, RN, from 29 November 1941
- Lieutenant Commander W.H. Nowell, RN, from 1 January 1943
- Lieutenant Commander(A) S.P. Luke, RN, from 7 May 1943
- Lieutenant Commander P.N. Medd, MBE, RN, from 24 January 1944
- Lieutenant Commander(A) D. Brooks, DSC & Bar, RNVR, from 8 July 1944
- Lieutenant Commander G.C. Edwards, RCNVR, from 7 April 1945
- Lieutenant Commander(A) G. Bennett, DSC, RNVR, from 28 July 1945
- disbanded - 29 October 1945

Note: Abbreviation (A) signifies Air Branch of the RN or RNVR.
