= 708 Naval Air Squadron =

Inactive flying squadron of the Royal Navy's Fleet Air Arm

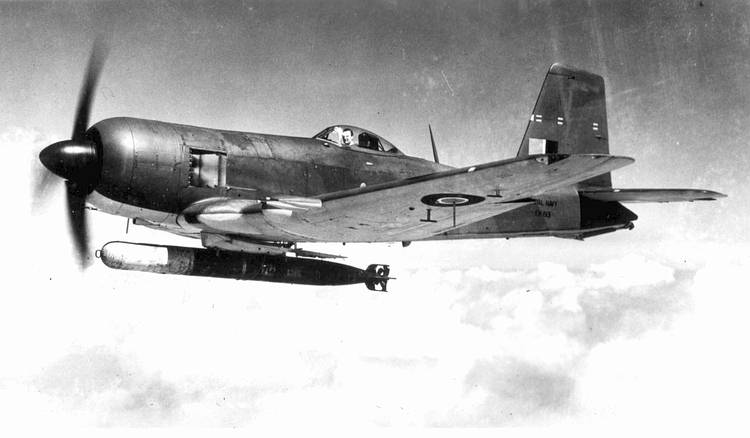
- Blackburn Firebrand, an example of the type used by 708 NAS
- Active: 1944–1946
- Disbanded: 26 February 1946
- Country: United Kingdom
- Branch: Royal Navy
- Type: Fleet Air Arm Second Line Squadron
- Role: Firebrand Tactical Trials Unit
- Size: Squadron
- Part of: Fleet Air Arm
- Home station: See Naval air stations section for full list.

Insignia
- Identification Markings: OA+

Aircraft flown
- Attack: Blackburn Firebrand
- Fighter: Supermarine Seafire

708 Naval Air Squadron (708 NAS), sometimes called 708 Squadron, is an inactive Fleet Air Arm (FAA) naval air squadron of the United Kingdom's Royal Navy (RN) which disbanded during February 1946. It formed during October 1944 at HMS Daedalus, RNAS Lee-on-Solent, as the Firebrand Tactical Trials Unit, before moving to nearby RAF Gosport the following January.

Tasked with looking into issues distinct to the Blackburn Firebrand the unit also performed deck landing training and torpedo exercises with the aircraft. The squadron moved to RNAS Ford where a number of personnel including the CO provided the core for the formation of 813 Naval Air Squadron, the Fleet Air Arm's initial operational Blackburn Firebrand unit. The squadron relocated to RNAS Fearn at the beginning of December and then in January 1946 it moved to RNAS Rattray.

== History ==
=== Firebrand Tactical Trials Unit (1944-1946) ===
708 Naval Air Squadron formed at RNAS Lee-on-Solent (HMS Daedalus) on 1 October 1944, from 'B' Flight of 764 Naval Air Squadron as the Firebrand Tactical Trials Unit. The squadron was equipped with Blackburn Firebrand T.F. II, a British single-engine strike fighter aircraft. The squadron was also equipped with Supermarine Seafire aircraft, a navalised version of the Supermarine Spitfire single seat fighter aircraft, which were used for combat practice versus some of the rocket projectile fitted Blackburn Firebrand aircraft.

In January 1945 the squadron relocated to RAF Gosport. There were a number of problems specific to the Blackburn Firebrand that required further investigation, however, issues such as available aircraft, serviceable aircraft and modifications to the aircraft, caused delays to the investigation activities, this along with the airfield at Gosport being ill-suited to the Blackburn Firebrand. The squadron did manage to undertake Deck Landing trials with the Colossus-class aircraft carrier HMS Glory in the River Clyde during May, and this later continued with the converted armed merchant cruiser HMS Pretoria Castle.

In August the first Blackburn Firebrand TF.Ill variants arrived. Torpedo exercises were conducted daily in Stokes Bay, a body of water on the Solent, via a torpedo collection stop-off at RNAS Lee-on-Solent. In September 708 Naval Air Squadron moved to RNAS Ford (HMS Peregrine), in West Sussex, here the commanding officer and several pilots provided a nucleus for the formation of the first operational Blackburn Firebrand unit, 813 Naval Air Squadron. The unit relocated to RNAS Fearn (HMS Owl), in the Scottish Highlands, towards the end of the year and then moved again in early 1946 to RNAS Rattray (HMS Merganser) in Aberdeenshire. 708 Naval Air Squadron disbanded on 26 February 1946.

== Aircraft flown ==
708 Naval Air Squadron operated a couple of different aircraft types and variants:

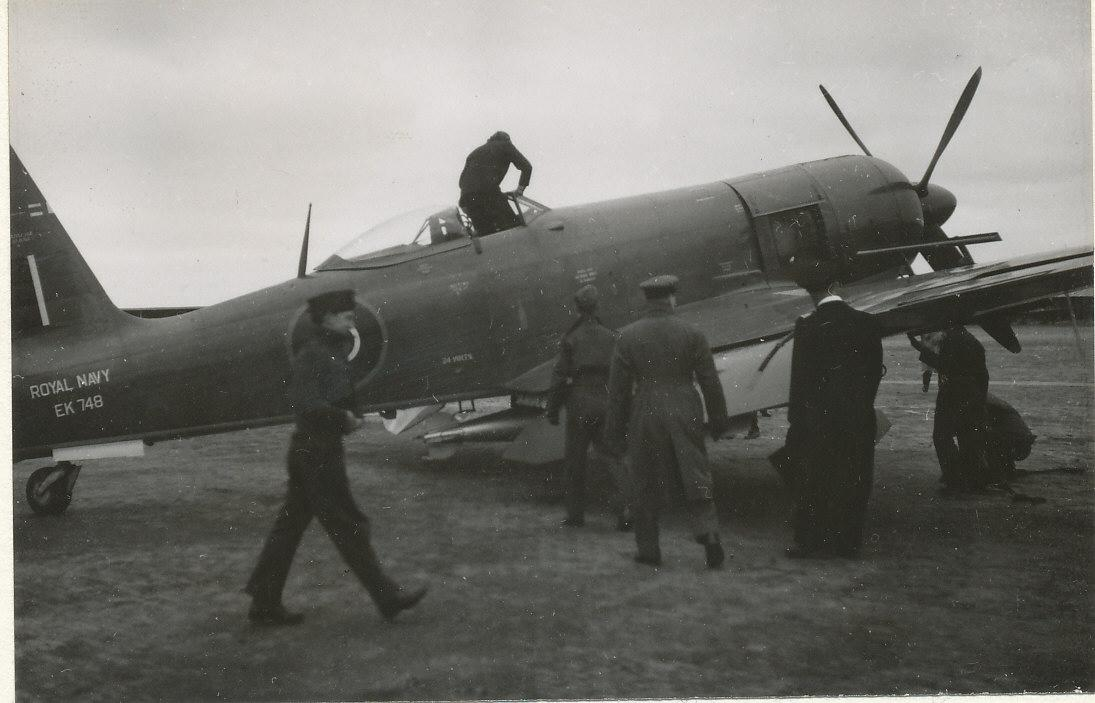
Blackburn Firebrand, serial EK-748, an example of the type used by 708 NAS

- Blackburn Firebrand TF.II strike fighter (October 1944 - August 1945)
- Blackburn Firebrand TF.III strike fighter (August 1945 - February 1946)
- Supermarine Seafire Mk.Ib carrier-based fighter aircraft (May - June 1945)
- Supermarine Seafire F Mk.IIc carrier-based fighter aircraft (May - August 1945)
- Supermarine Seafire F Mk.III carrier-based fighter aircraft (May - August 1945)

== Naval air stations ==
708 Naval Air Squadron operated from a number of naval air stations of the Royal Navy, and a Royal Air Force station, in the United Kingdom:

- Royal Naval Air Station Lee-on-Solent (HMS Daedalus), Hampshire, (1 October 1944 - 15 January 1945)
- RAF Gosport, Hampshire, (15 January 1945 - 6 September 1945)
  - HMS Glory - (Deck Landing Training May 1945)
  - HMS Pretoria Castle - (Deck Landing Training May - June 1945)
- Royal Naval Air Station Ford (HMS Peregrine), West Sussex, (6 September 1945 - 5 December 1945)
- Royal Naval Air Station Fearn (HMS Owl), Scottish Highlands, (5 December 1945 - 8 January 1946)
- Royal Naval Air Station Rattray (HMS Merganser), Aberdeenshire, (8 January 1946 - 26 February 1946)
- disbanded - (26 February 1946)

== Commanding officers ==
List of commanding officers of 708 Naval Air Squadron with date of appointment.

- Lieutenant K. Lee-White, MBE, RN, from 1 October 1944
- Lieutenant(A) D.L.R. Hutchinson, RNVR, from 20 August 1945
- Lieutenant(A) W. Orr, RNVR, from 2 November 1945
- disbanded - 26 February 1946

Note: Abbreviation (A) signifies Air Branch of the RN or RNVR.
