= 714 Naval Air Squadron =

Inactive flying squadron of the Royal Navy's Fleet Air Arm

714 Naval Air Squadron ~~714 (Catapult) Flight FAA~~
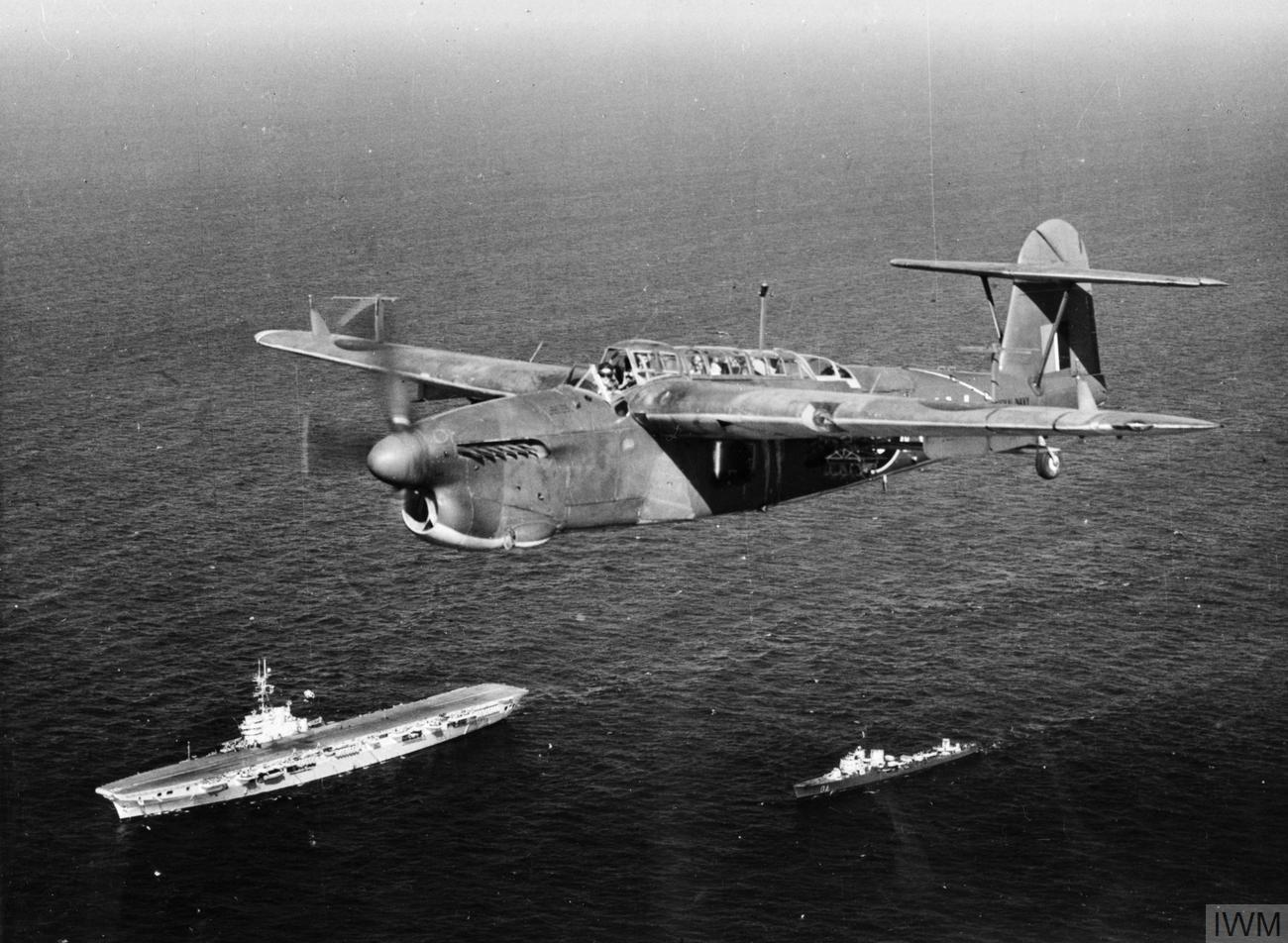
- Fairey Barracuda; an example of the type used by 714 NAS
- Active: Royal Air Force; 1936–1939; Royal Navy: 1939–1940; 1944–1945
- Disbanded: 29 October 1945
- Country: United Kingdom
- Branch: Royal Navy
- Type: Fleet Air Arm Second Line Squadron
- Role: Catapult Flight; Torpedo Bomber Reconnaissance Training Squadron
- Size: Squadron
- Part of: Fleet Air Arm
- Home station: See Naval air stations section for full list.

Commanders
- Notable commanders: Lieutenant Commander J.R. Godley, RNVR

Insignia
- Identification Markings: 305, 307 (Walrus); J9A+ (Walrus May 1939); F1A+ & F2A+ (Barracuda); AT1A+ & AT2A+ (Barracuda October 1944); I1A+ & I2A+ (Barracuda later)

Aircraft flown
- Bomber: Fairey Barracuda
- Patrol: Supermarine Walrus
- Reconnaissance: Fairey III; Hawker Osprey; Fairey Seafox

714 Naval Air Squadron (714 NAS), also referred to as 714 Squadron, is an inactive Fleet Air Arm (FAA) naval air squadron of the United Kingdom's Royal Navy (RN). It was last operational from August 1944, at RNAS Fearn, HMS Owl, Scottish Highlands,as a Torpedo Bomber Reconnaissance Training Squadron, equipped with Fairey Barracuda torpedo and dive bomber aircraft. The squadron relocated to RNAS Rattray HMS Merganser, Aberdeenshire, in October and was disbanded nearly one year later, almost to the exact day.

The unit was initially established as 714 (Catapult) Flight in July 1936. By 1939, it had evolved from a Flight into a Squadron and was actively operating from the Town-class light cruisers HMS Gloucester, HMS Liverpool, and HMS Manchester at the onset of the Second World War, utilising Supermarine Walrus aircraft, with RAF Seletar, Singapore and RAF China Bay, Ceylon, serving as its shore bases. In 1940, it was incorporated into 700 Naval Air Squadron.

== History ==
=== Catapult flight / squadron (1936-1940) ===
It was first formed as 714 (Catapult) Flight on 15 July 1936, by renumbering 406 (Catapult) Flight, and operated Fairey IIIF floatplanes from cruisers in the East Indies (probably principally 4th Cruiser Squadron). The Fairey IIFs were quickly replaced by Hawker Osprey floatplanes and Supermarine Walrus flying boats, and in 1937 these were supplemented by Fairey Seafox floatplanes. By July 1938 it had consolidated on the Walrus as equipment, and in early 1939 it was upgraded to full squadron status. It was disbanded on 21 January 1940, when all the Fleet Air Arm's catapult units were merged to form 700 Naval Air Squadron.

=== Torpedo Bomber Reconnaissance Training squadron (1944-1945) ===
The squadron was reformed on 1 August 1944 at RNAS Fearn (HMS Owl) near Tain, Scotland, as an operational training squadron equipped with the Fairey Barracuda. It moved to RNAS Rattray (HMS Merganser) near Crimond, Aberdeenshire in October 1944. Its commanding officers included Lieutenant Commander J R Godley, who transferred from the disbanded 835 Naval Air Squadron, taking over in May 1945. The squadron disbanded on 29 October 1945.

== Aircraft flown ==
714 Naval Air Squadron operated a number of different aircraft types:

- Fairey IIIF reconnaissance biplane (July - October 1936)
- Hawker Osprey FP fighter and reconnaissance biplane (July 1936 - July 1938)
- Supermarine Walrus Amphibious maritime patrol aircraft (October 1936 - January 1940)
- Fairey Seafox reconnaissance seaplane (June 1937 - July 1938)
- Fairey Barracuda Mk II torpedo and dive bomber (August 1944 - October 1945)
- Fairey Barracuda Mk III torpedo and dive bomber (October 1945)

== Naval air stations ==
714 Naval Air Squadron operated from a couple of naval air station of the Royal Navy in the United Kingdom and a couple Royal Air Force stations overseas:

1936 - 1940

- Royal Air Force Seletar, Singapore, (15 July 1936 - 21 January 1940)
  - Royal Air Force China Bay, Ceylon, (Detachments 1938 - 1939)
- disbanded - (21 January 1940)

1944 - 1945

- Royal Naval Air Station Fearn (HMS Owl), Scottish Highlands, (1 August 1944 - 30 October 1944)
- Royal Naval Air Station Rattray (HMS Merganser), Aberdeenshire, (30 October 1944 - 29 October 1945)
- disbanded - (29 October 1945)

== Ships' Flights ==
List of Royal Navy ships where responsibility for the aircraft belonged to 714 Flight, between 1936 and 1940:

- HMS Emerald 1936–38
- HMS Enterprise 1936–38
- HMS Norfolk 1936–39
- HMS Liverpool 1938–40
- HMS Manchester 1938–40
- HMS Gloucester 1939–40

== Commanding officers ==
List of commanding officers of 714 Naval Air Squadron with date of appointment:

1936 - 1940

- Lieutenant Commander H.H. Caddy, RN, (Flight Lieutenant, RAF), from 15 July 1936
- Lieutenant R.C. Tillard, RN, (Flight Lieutenant, RAF), from 15 June 1937
- Lieutenant Commander P.W. Humphreys, RN, (Squadron Leader, RAF), RN, from 26 October 1937
- Lieutenant H.J.F. Lane, RN, from 27 January 1939
- Lieutenant Commander A.S. Webb, RN, from 24 May 1939
- disbanded - 21 January 1940

1944 - 1945

- Lieutenant Commander(A) V.R. Crane, RNVR, from 1 August 1944
- Lieutenant(A) P.D. Buckland, RNVR, from 15 May 1945
- Lieutenant Commander(A) J.R. Godley, DSC, RNVR, from 19 May 1945
- disbanded - 29 October 1945

Note: Abbreviation (A) signifies Air Branch of the RN or RNVR.
