= Fairey Seal =

1930s British reconnaissance aircraft

Seal
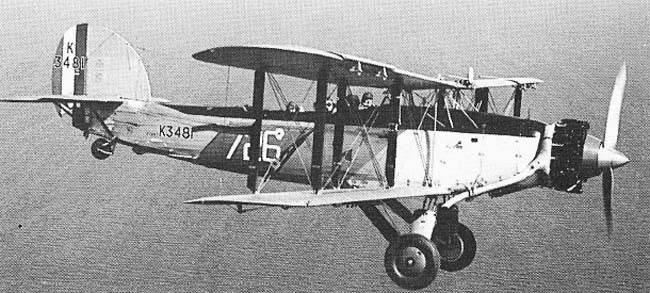

General information
- Type: Spotter-reconnaissance
- Manufacturer: Fairey Aviation
- Primary users: Fleet Air Arm Royal Air Force

History
- Manufactured: 91
- Introduction date: 1933
- First flight: 1930
- Retired: 1943

The Fairey Seal was a British carrier-borne spotter-reconnaissance aircraft, operated in the 1930s. The Seal was derived – like the Gordon – from the IIIF. To enable the Fairey Seal to be launched by catapult from warships, it could be fitted with floats.

== Service life and operations ==
The Seal was designed and built by Fairey Aviation. It first flew in 1930 and entered squadron service with the Fleet Air Arm (FAA) in 1933. Ninety-one aircraft were produced.

The FAA started to replace it with the Swordfish Mk1 from 1936. By 1938 all FAA torpedo squadrons had been re-equipped with the Swordfish. The Seal was removed from front-line service by 1938 but remained in secondary and support roles. By the outbreak of the Second World War, only four remained in service. The type was retired by 1943. The type was last used in India as an instructional airframe from the Royal Navy Photographic Unit.

The Royal Air Force (RAF) also operated the Seal as a target tug. Twelve aircraft were part of No 10 Bombing and Gunnery School until 1940. A further four aircraft were used by 273 Squadron in Ceylon. These aircraft were used on coastal patrols, some as floatplanes. By May 1942, the type had been retired from RAF service.

In 1934 Latvia ordered four Seal floatplanes for its naval aviation (factory numbers F.2112–2115, tactical numbers 26–29, later 98–101). Between 22 June and 5 July 1936 three floatplanes under Colonel Janis Indans undertook a 6,000 km (3,700 mi)-long journey from Liepāja through Baltic and North European countries to England and back. In autumn 1940, after Latvia's annexation, the aircraft were taken by the Soviets but they were not used and they remained stored on Kisezers lake. On 28 June 1941 they were destroyed there by German aircraft.

== Variants ==
- Fairey IIIF Mk VI : The first prototype was converted from a Fairey IIIF MK IIIB.
- Fairey Seal : Three-seat spotter-reconnaissance aircraft for the Royal Navy.

== Operators ==
Argentina

- Argentine Navy

Chile

- Chilean Navy
- Chilean Air Force

Latvia

- Latvian Navy
- Latvian Air Force (from 1936)

Peru

- Peruvian Air Force
- Peruvian Navy

United Kingdom

- Royal Air Force
- Fleet Air Arm
  - 701 Naval Air Squadron
  - 702 Naval Air Squadron
  - 753 Naval Air Squadron
  - 820 Naval Air Squadron
  - 821 Naval Air Squadron
  - 822 Naval Air Squadron
  - 823 Naval Air Squadron
  - 824 Naval Air Squadron

== Specifications (Landplane) ==
Data from British Naval Aircraft since 1912

General characteristics

- Crew: 3
- Length: 33 ft 8 in (10.26 m)
- Wingspan: 45 ft 9 in (13.94 m)
- Height: 12 ft 9 in (3.89 m)
- Wing area: 443.5 sq ft (41.20 m^{2})
- Gross weight: 6,000 lb (2,722 kg)
- Powerplant: 1 × Armstrong Siddeley Panther IIA 14-cylinder air-cooled radial piston engine, 525 hp (391 kW)
- Propellers: 2-bladed fixed-pitch propeller

Performance

- Maximum speed: 138 mph (222 km/h, 120 kn)
- Endurance: 4 hours 30 minutes
- Service ceiling: 17,000 ft (5,200 m)
- Time to altitude: 5,000 ft (1,524 m) in 5 minutes 20 seconds

Armament

- Guns: 1 × fixed forward-firing .303 in (7.7 mm) Vickers machine gun and 1 × .303 in (7.7 mm) Lewis Gun in rear cockpit
- Bombs: 500 lb (230 kg) or stores carried under lower wings

== See also ==
Related development

- Fairey Gordon
- Fairey IIIF

Aircraft of comparable role, configuration, and era

- Blackburn Baffin
- Fairey Swordfish
- Vickers Vildebeest

== Bibliography ==
- Lezon, Ricardo Martin & Stitt, Robert M. (January–February 2004). "Eyes of the Fleet: Seaplanes in Argentine Navy Service, Part 2". Air Enthusiast (109): 46–59. ISSN 0143-5450.
- Sturtivant, R; Burrow, M (1995). Fleet Air Arm Aircraft 1939 to 1945. Tonbridge, Kent, UK: Air Britain (Historians) Ltd. ISBN 0-85130-232-7.
- Taylor, H.A. (1974). Fairey Aircraft since 1915. London: Putnam. ISBN 0-370-00065-X.
- Thetford, Owen (1978). British Naval Aircraft Since 1912. London: Putnam. ISBN 0-370-30021-1.
- Tincopa, Amaru (April 2022). "Wings over Peru: The Fairey Seal". The Aviation Historian (39): 74–81. ISSN 2051-1930.
- Thetford, Owen (1991). British Naval Aircraft since 1912. London, UK: Putnam Aeronautical Books, an imprint of Conway Maritime Press Ltd. ISBN 0-85177-849-6.
- Vicary, Adrian (1984). Naval Wings. Wellingborough, UK: Patrick Stephens Ltd. ISBN 0-85059-660-2.
