= 821 Naval Air Squadron =

Inactive flying squadron of the Royal Navy's Fleet Air Arm

- Squadron badge
- Active: Royal Air Force: 1933–1939; Royal Navy: 1939–1941; 1941–1943; 1944–1946; 1951–1953
- Disbanded: 25 May 1953
- Country: United Kingdom
- Branch: Royal Navy
- Type: Torpedo Bomber Reconnaissance squadron
- Role: Carrier-based: anti-submarine warfare (ASW); anti-surface warfare (ASuW)
- Part of: Fleet Air Arm
- Mottos: À coup sûr (French for 'With a sure or certain blow')
- Aircraft: See Aircraft operated section for full list.
- Engagements: World War II; Korean War
- Battle honours: Norway 1940; Libya 1942; Mediterranean 1942-43; Korea 1952-53

Insignia
- Squadron Badge Description: White, on a fess wavy blue a foul anchor within a wreath of laurel winged gold (1937)
- Identification Markings: 721-735 (IIIF/Seal); 678-691 (Shark); 678-685 (Swordfish); A5A+ (Swordfish May 1939); 5A+ (Swordfish later); single letters (Swordfish July 1941); S5A+ (Albacore); single letters (Albacore later); NA+ (Barracuda on HMS Puncher); single letters (Barracuda later); 241-248 (Firefly); 200-209 (Firefly June 1952)
- Fin Carrier/Shore Codes: MA (Firefly); R (Firefly June 1952)

821 Naval Air Squadron (821 NAS), sometimes referred to as 821 Squadron, is an inactive Fleet Air Arm (FAA) naval air squadron of the United Kingdom's Royal Navy (RN). It most recently operated with Fairey Firefly FR.Mk 5 fighter-reconnaissance aircraft between May 1952 and May 1953 and was last embarked in the Colossus-class light fleet carrier HMS Glory, notably during the Korean War.

It was a carrier based squadron formed in April 1933 with the transferral and amalgamation of the Fairey III aircraft from 446 and half of 455 Flight (Fleet Spotter Reconnaissance) Flights Royal Air Force RAF to the newly formed Fleet Air Arm of the RAF. During its service with the RAF, the squadron also utilised aircraft such as the Fairey Seal, Blackburn Shark and Fairey Swordfish. After its transfer to the Royal Navy it next flew Fairey Albacore during the Second World War and the latter part, it also operated the Fairey Barracuda.

== History ==
=== Pre-war (1933–1939) ===
821 Naval Air Squadron was established at RAF Gosport, Hampshire, on 3 April 1933 as a Spotter Reconnaissance unit, originating from 446 (Fleet Reconnaissance) Flight and half of 445 (Fleet Reconnaissance) Flight.

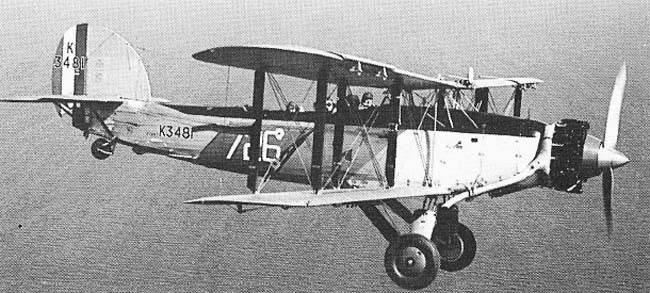
Fairey Seal of 821 Squadron from HMS Courageous

Initially outfitted with nine Fairey IIIFs, the squadron quickly began transitioning to Fairey Seal aircraft, with the final IIIF departing in October. The squadron boarded the aircraft carrier HMS Courageous in May for operations in the Home Fleet; however, in August 1935, the carrier set sail to join the Mediterranean Fleet in response to the Abyssinian crisis. At this point, the squadron's strength comprised twelve aircraft, but shortly after returning home, the Seals were transferred to 822 Naval Air Squadron in March 1936, being substituted by twelve Blackburn Shark IIs, thus transforming 821 into a Torpedo Spotter Reconnaissance unit. The Sharks were subsequently replaced in September 1937 by twelve Fairey Swordfish Is. In November 1938, the squadron was reassigned to HMS Ark Royal, embarking for the first time in January 1939 for a Spring Cruise in the Mediterranean Sea.

The squadron was taken over by the Admiralty on 24 May 1939 at RAF Evanton, Ross and Cromarty.

=== Second World War (1939–1945) ===
At the commencement of the Second World War, twelve Swordfish torpedo bombers were being operated by the squadron from HMS Ark Royal, with RNAS Hatston (HMS Sparrowhawk) located on Mainland, Orkney, serving as the shore base.

Operating off HMS Ark Royal the squadron was responsible for the first Allied U-boat kill of the war, when they sank U-39, after she had unsuccessfully tried to torpedo the aircraft carrier. The squadron sailed with Ark Royal to the South Atlantic and Indian Ocean, searching for German shipping and commerce raiders. After briefly operating in the Mediterranean Sea, the German invasion of Norway in April 1940 caused Ark Royal to be recalled to support Allied operations in Norway.

Off the coast of Norway, the squadron's aircraft conducted patrols and bombed land targets prior to disembarking at RNAS Hatston, where they continued anti-submarine patrols between Orkney and Norway. On 21 June, it participated in the unsuccessful assault on the German battleship Scharnhorst.

The primary squadron was disbanded on 2 December and 'X' Flight separated with six aircraft to travel to Gibraltar aboard HMS Argus. It subsequently proceeded to Malta on Ark Royal and continued its journey to Egypt, where it was quickly integrated into 815 Naval Air Squadron, which was in the process of regrouping.

821 Naval Air Squadron was re-established at RAF Detling, Kent, on 1 July 1941, originating from 'X' Flight of 816 Naval Air Squadron. Initially, the squadron was equipped with six Fairey Swordfish aircraft for conducting anti-submarine patrols in the northern regions of Scotland, operating from RAF Sumburgh, Shetland and RNAS Hatston.

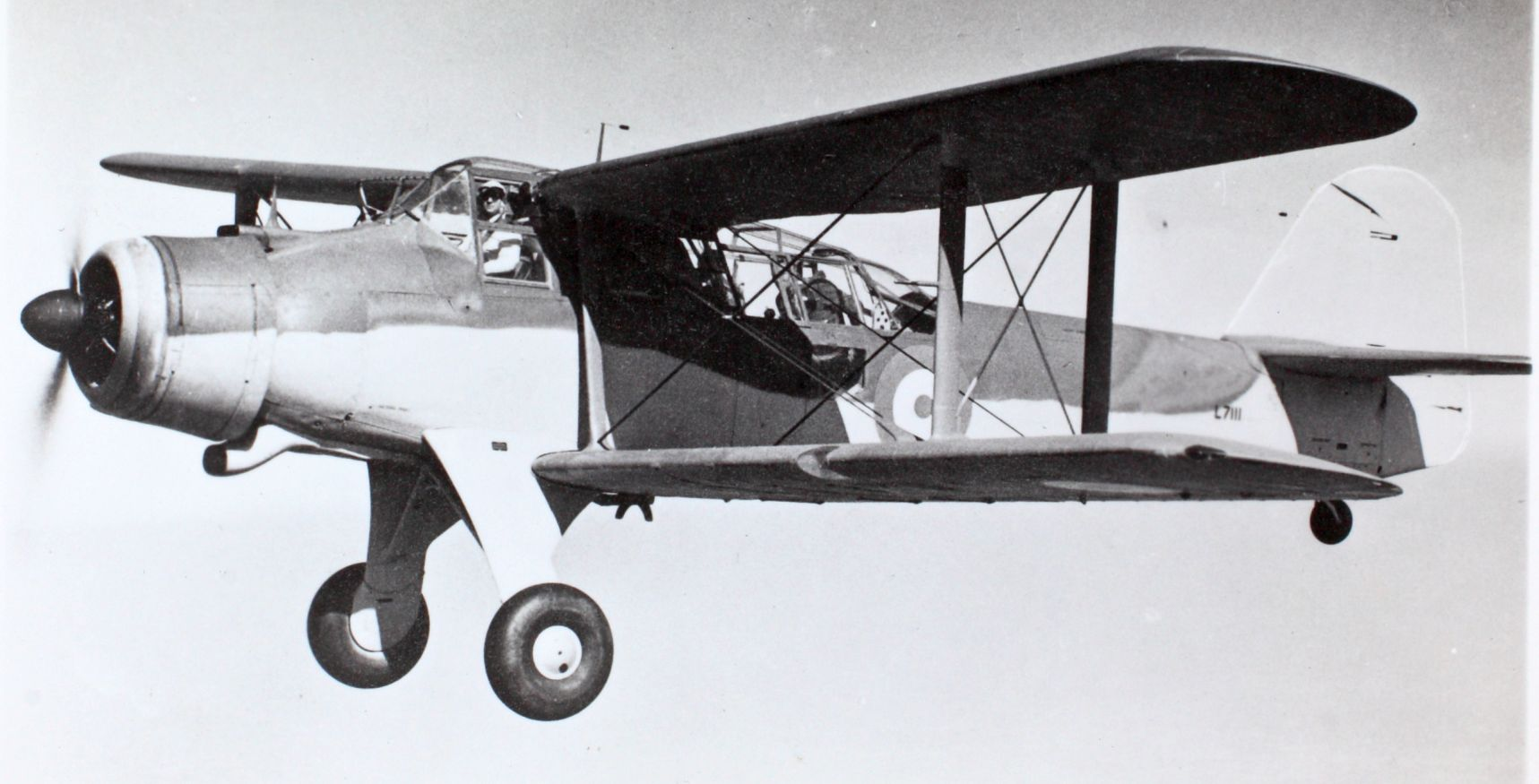
Fairey Albacore; an example of the type used by 821 Squadron

The personnel of the squadron embarked for Egypt and subsequently re-equipped at RNAS Dekheila (HMS Grebe), Alexandria, Egypt, in January 1942 with six Fairey Albacore torpedo bombers. The squadron conducted operations in the Western Desert, providing support to the ground forces in the region, which included flare dropping in aid of RAF bomber squadrons, conducting bombing raids, and laying naval mines, retreating as the Afrika Korps advanced towards Alexandria, often being the last to vacate a Landing Ground on multiple occasions. In August, a detachment was dispatched to Cyprus to assist in the bombardment of Rhodes. By November, after completing 471 operational sorties and dropping 4,250 flares, the squadron's task was deemed unnecessary following the battle of Alamein.

The squadron relocated to RAF Hal Far, Malta, in November 1942 to engage enemy convoys traveling from Italy to North Africa. In March 1943, a flight was assigned to RAF Castel Benito, Tripoli, in North Africa to designate targets for the RAF. The complete squadron regrouped in North Africa in June 1943 for anti-submarine missions, before returning to the United Kingdom without its aircraft and officially disbanding on 10 October 1943.

==== Barracuda (1944–1946) ====
On 1 May 1944, 821 Squadron was reformed at RNAS Stretton (HMS Blackcap), Cheshire, equipped with twelve Fairey Barracuda Mk II aircraft, a carrier-based torpedo and dive bomber and subsequently embarked in the Ruler-class escort carrier HMS Puncher in November.

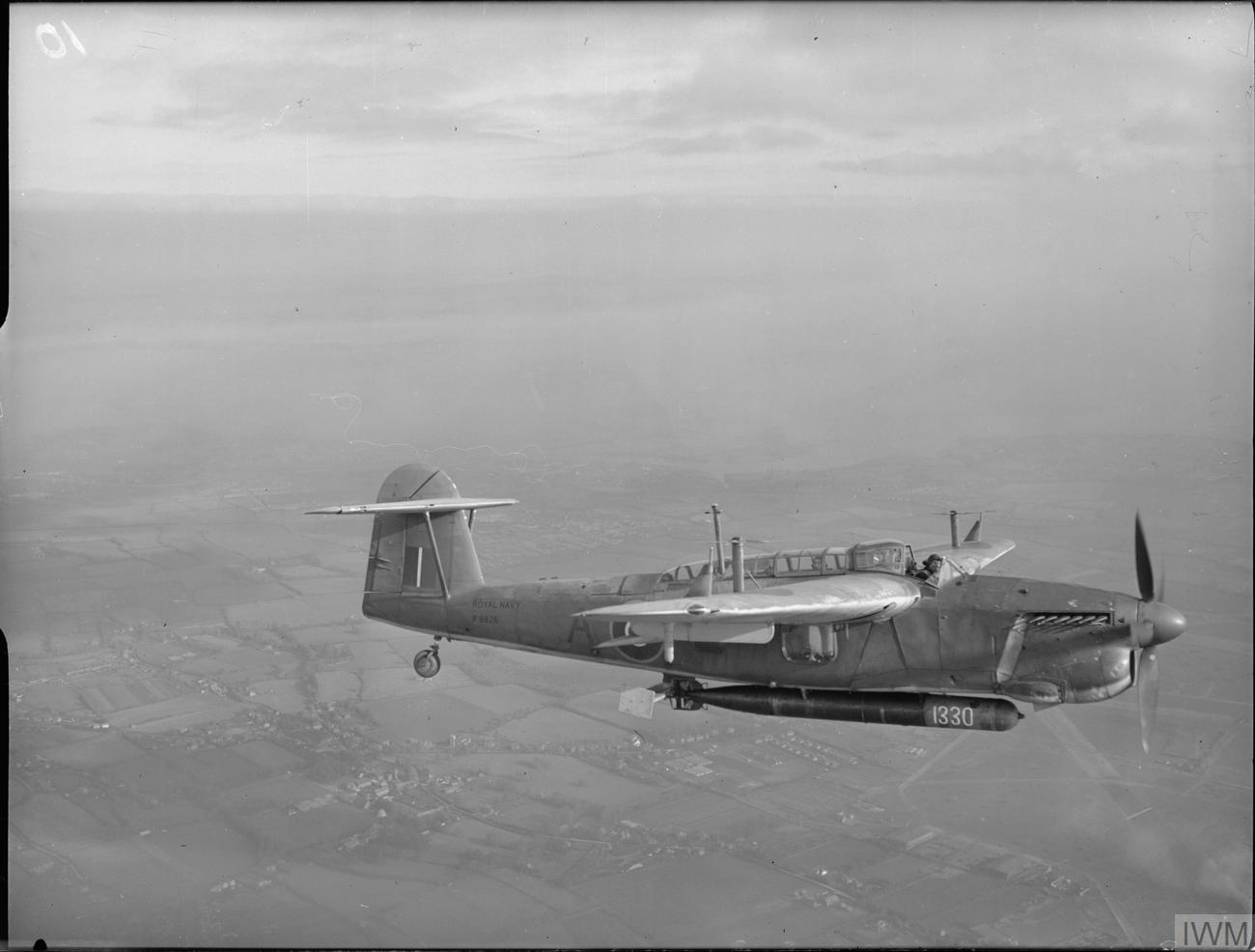
Fairey Barracuda Mk II; an example of the type used by 821 Squadron

The unit was re-equipped with Barracuda Mk IIIs in January 1945, and in the subsequent month, it commenced in Operation Selenium, mine-laying operations off the coast of Norway. Although six Grumman Wildcat fighter aircraft were transferred from 835 Naval Air Squadron in April 1945, they were quickly withdrawn following VE Day.

The squadron embarked on sister ship HMS Trumpeter on 3 July for deployment to the Far East, arriving in the RN Air Section at RAF Cochin, (HMS Kalugu), southern India, on 26 July. departing for RNAS Katukurunda (HMS Ukussa), Ceylon, on 11 August.

However, it returned home aboard the Attacker-class escort carrier HMS Fencer without engaging in further combat. The squadron was disbanded on 1 February 1946.

=== Firefly (1951–1953) ===
In September 1951, 821 was reformed at the Royal Naval Air Station at Arbroath, located in Angus, HMS Condor, as an anti-submarine unit equipped with eight Fairey Firefly AS.6s, which were an anti-submarine warfare aircraft. Nevertheless, in May 1952, the squadron's function was changed to that of a strike squadron, resulting in its re-equipment with ten Firefly FR.5s.

The Fairey Firefly Mk. 5 emerged as the most extensively manufactured variant of the subsequent Firefly models. This particular version marked the beginning of the Firefly's adaptation to various specialised roles, resulting in the development of subvariants like the FR.5 designed for day fighter-reconnaissance, the NF.5 intended for night-fighting, and the AS.5 tailored for anti-submarine patrol. The differences between these Fireflies were mainly internal.

In September, the squadron embarked in the Colossus-class light fleet carrier HMS Glory for operational preparations and made a rapid journey to the Far East, where on 27 October, they carried out attacks on enemy positions located south of Kuala Lumpur. Beginning in November, the ship undertook eleven nine-day patrols off the coast of Korea, during which 821 Squadron executed 1,666 operational sorties over North Korea. All of their operational aircraft were relocated to Iwakuni before their departure for RAF Kai Tak, Hong Kong, where the squadron was disbanded on 25 May 1953.

== Aircraft operated ==
The squadron operated a variety of different aircraft and versions:

- Fairey IIIF reconnaissance biplane (April - October 1933)
- Fairey Seal spotter-reconnaissance aircraft (April 1933 - March 1936)
- Blackburn Shark Mk II torpedo bomber (March 1936 - September 1937)
- Fairey Swordfish I torpedo bomber (September 1937 - November 1941)
- Fairey Albacore torpedo bomber (January 1942 - September 1943)
- Fairey Barracuda Mk II torpedo and dive bomber (May 1944 - April 1945)
- Fairey Barracuda Mk III torpedo bomber (January - August 1945, October 1945 - January 1946)
- Grumman Wildcat Mk VI fighter aircraft (April - May 1945)
- Fairey Firefly AS.Mk 6 anti-submarine aircraft (September 1951 - May 1952)
- Fairey Firefly FR.Mk 5 fighter-reconnaissance aircraft (May 1952 - May 1953)

== Battle honours ==
The following four Battle Honours have been awarded to 821 Naval Air Squadron:

- Norway 1940
- Libya 1942
- Mediterranean 1942-43
- Korea 1952-53

== Commanding officers ==
List of commanding officers of 821 Naval Air Squadron with date of appointment:

1933 - 1941

- Lieutenant R.A. Peyton, RN, (Flight Lieutenant, RAF), from 3 April 1933
- Squadron Leader B.E. Harrison, AFC, RAF, from 6 May 1933
- Lieutenant Commander C.B. Tidd, RN, (Squadron Leader, RAF), from 5 September 1934
- Squadron Leader F.C.B. Saville, RAF, from 4 January 1935
- Squadron Leader H.N. Hampton, DFC, RAF, 8 May 1935
- Lieutenant Commander A. Brock, RN, (Squadron Leader, RAF), from 11 October 1935
- Squadron Leader G.R.M. Clifford, RAF, from 21 September 1936
- Squadron Leader N.E. Morrison, RAF, from 15 December 1938
- Lieutenant Commander J.A.D. Wroughton, RN, (Squadron Leader, RAF), from 29 March 1939
- Lieutenant Commander G.M. Duncan, RN, 24 May 1939
- Lieutenant Commander J.A.D. Wroughton, RN, from 14 September 1939
- Major W.H.N. Martin, RM, from 29 May 1940
- Lieutenant Commander R.R. Wood, RN, from 27 December 1940
- disbanded - 21 January 1941

1941 - 1943

- Lieutenant C.W.B. Smith, DFC, RN, from 15 July 1941 (loaned 826 Naval Air Squadron, 25 January 1942, KiA 5 March 1942)
- Captain A.C. Newson, RM, from 13 March 1942 (Major, DSC, 21 June 1942)
- Lieutenant C.H.C. O'Rorke, RN, from 24 March 1943 (Lieutenant Commander, 22 April 1943)
- disbanded - 7 October 1943

1944 - 1946

- Lieutenant Commander(A) M. Thorpe, RN, from 1 May 1944
- Lieutenant Commander(A) D. Brooks, DSC and Bar, RNVR, from 14 June 1945
- Lieutenant Commander(A) H.P. Dawson, RN, from 15 January 1946
- disbanded - 1 February 1946

1951 - 1953

- Lieutenant Commander B.H. Notley, RN, from 18 September 1951
- Lieutenant Commander J.R.N. Gardner, RN, from 8 May 1952
- Lieutenant P. Cane, RN, from 13 January 1953
- disbanded - 25 May 1953

Note: Abbreviation (A) signifies Air Branch of the RN or RNVR.
