= 824 Naval Air Squadron =

Flying squadron of the Royal Navy's Fleet Air Arm

- Badge
- Active: Royal Air Force: 1933–1934; 1939–1939; Royal Navy: 1939–1942; 1942–1944; 1945–1946; 1952–1956; 1956–1957; 1958–1959; 1959–1963; 1970–1989; 2000–present
- Country: United Kingdom
- Branch: Royal Navy
- Type: Flying squadron
- Role: Merlin HM2 crew training
- Part of: Fleet Air Arm
- Home station: RNAS Culdrose
- Mottos: Spectat ubique spiritus (Latin for 'Behold, the wind all around them')
- Aircraft: AgustaWestland Merlin HM2
- Website: Official website

Commanders
- Current commander: Commander Ben Unsworth

824 Naval Air Squadron (824 NAS), also referred as 824 Squadron, is a Fleet Air Arm (FAA) naval air squadron of the United Kingdom’s Royal Navy (RN), based at RNAS Culdrose and currently operating the AgustaWestland Merlin HM2 Operational Conversion Unit. It trains both aircrew and engineers on the methods of flying, operating, and utilising in Anti-Submarine warfare and Airborne Surveillance and Control.

== History ==
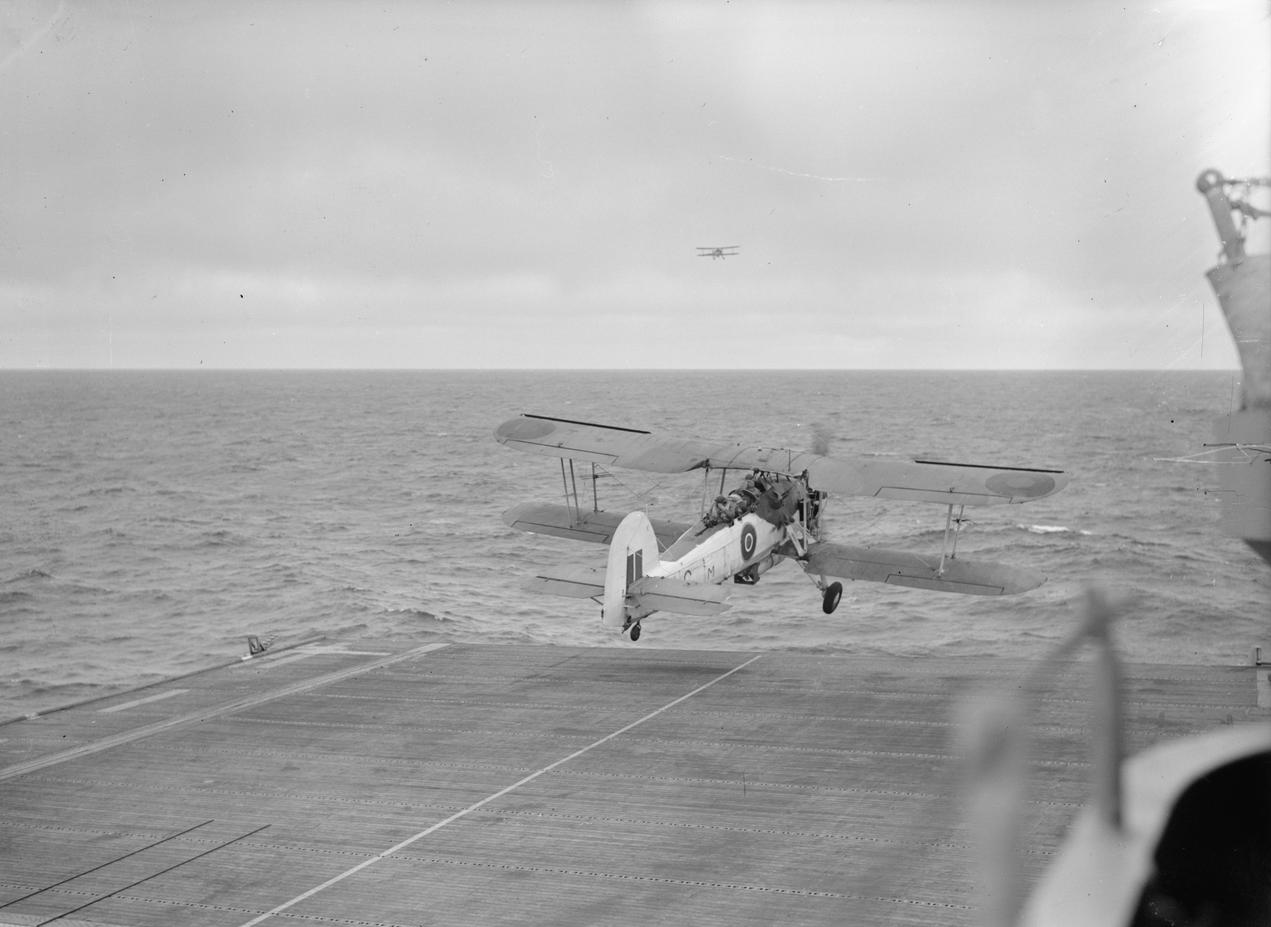
Fairey Swordfish of 824 Squadron launching from HMS Striker

The squadron was originally formed on 3 April 1933 as a Spotter Reconnaissance squadron. During World War II, the squadron carried out various duties, such as convoy protection, bombing raids, spotting for gunnery bombardments and attacks on enemy destroyers. The squadron took part in the Battle of Taranto on 11 November 1940, where together with aircraft from 813, 815 and 819 squadrons flying from HMS Illustrious, it successfully attacked the Italian Battle Squadron. It was disbanded 10 times between 1934 and 1970, in that time it was equipped with the Fairey Seal, Fairey Swordfish, Fairey Barracuda, Fairey Firefly and finally the Fairey Gannet.

The squadron participated in the Falklands War, later responsible for trials of the Sea King helicopter. The squadron again disbanded in August 1989 and its aircraft were transferred to 819 Naval Air Squadron at Prestwick.

== Current use ==
824 Naval Air Squadron reformed on 2 June 2000 at RNAS Culdrose, equipped with eight AgustaWestland Merlin HM.1 helicopters. In January 2013 824 NAS received its first new HM.2 Merlin aircraft with the squadron fully converted by the end of 2013.

It currently trains Pilots, Observers and Aircrewman on the Merlin HM.2 helicopter in Anti-Submarine Warfare. Once trained the aircrew go to one of the front line Merlin squadrons 814 NAS and 820 NAS.

== Aircraft operated ==
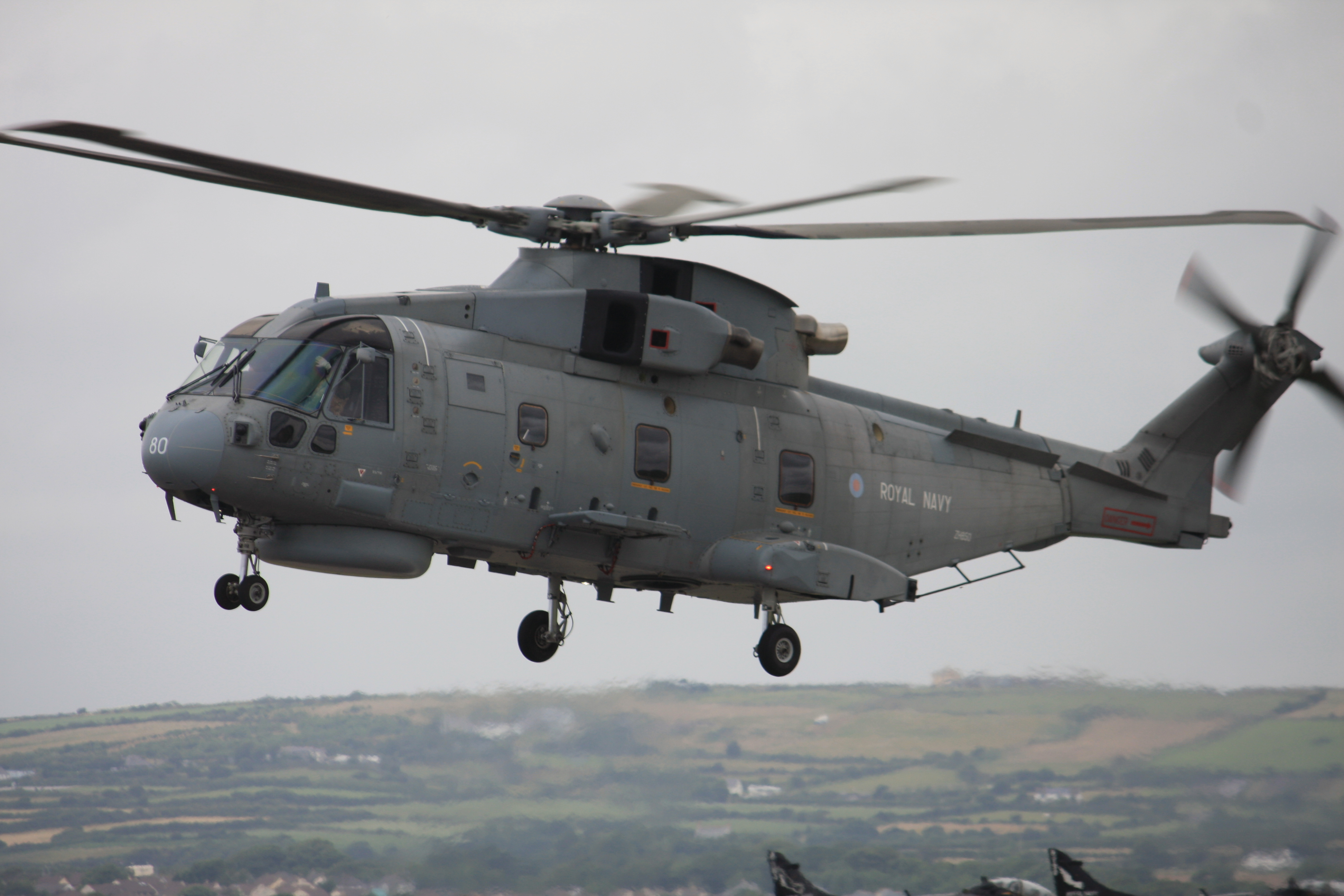
Merlin HM2 of 824 Squadron.

The squadron operated a variety of different aircraft and versions:

- Fairey III F
- Fairey Seal
- Fairey Swordfish I & II
- Hawker Sea Hurricane IIc
- Grumman Wildcat V
- Fairey Barracuda II
- Fairey Firefly FR.1 & AS.6
- Grumman Avenger TBM-3E & AS.4
- Fairey Gannet AS.1, T.2 & AS.4
- Westland Whirlwind HAS.7
- Westland Sea King HAS.1, HAS.2/2a, HAS.2(AEW), HAS.5 & HAS,6
- AgustaWestland Merlin HM.1
- AgustaWestland Merlin HM.2 (current)

== Battle honours ==
824 Naval Air Squadron has received the following battle honours:

- Calabria 1940
- Mediterranean 1940
- Taranto 1940
- Libya 1940
- Malta Convoys 1942
- Arctic 1944
- Falkland Islands 1982

== Bibliography ==
- Rawlings, J. D. R. (August 1963). "History of 824 Squadron". Air Pictorial. Vol. 25, no. 8. pp. 242–243.
- Sturtivant, Ray; Ballance, Theo (1994). The Squadrons of The Fleet Air Arm. Tonbridge, UK: Air-Britain (Historians) Ltd. ISBN 0-85130-223-8.
