= Attacker-class escort carrier =

1942 class of escort aircraft carriers of the Royal Navy

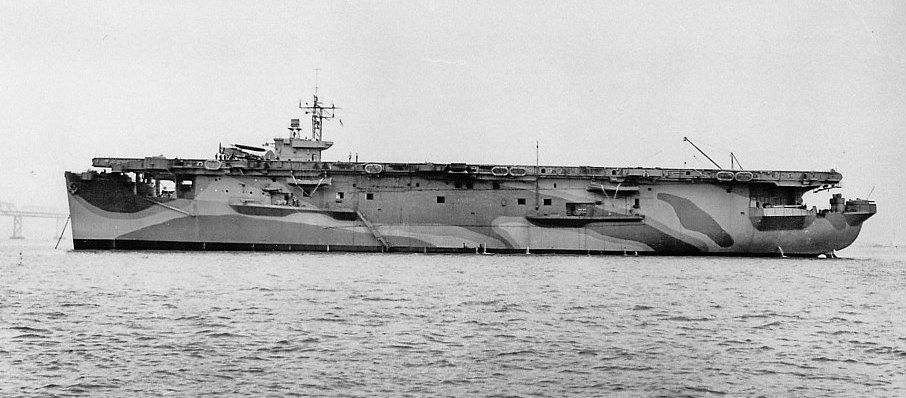
- HMS Attacker

Class overview
- Name: Attacker class
- Builders: 4 at Ingalls Shipbuilding; 4 at Western Pipe & Steel; 3 at Seattle-Tacoma Shipbuilding Corporation
- Operators: Royal Navy
- Preceded by: Avenger class
- Succeeded by: Ruler class
- Built: 1941–1943
- In commission: 1942–1946
- Planned: 11
- Completed: 11
- Retired: 8
- Scrapped: 3

General characteristics
- Type: Escort carrier
- Displacement: 10,200 long tons (10,360 t) (standard); 14,400 long tons (14,630 t) (full load)
- Length: 465 ft (142 m) (wl); 496 ft (151 m) (oa); 440 ft (130 m) (fd)
- Beam: 69 ft 6 in (21.18 m) wl; 82 ft (25 m) (fd); 111 ft 6 in (33.99 m) (extreme width)
- Draught: 23 ft 3 in (7.09 m) (mean); 26 ft (7.9 m) (deep load)
- Installed power: 2 × Foster-Wheeler 285 psi (1,970 kPa) boilers; 8,500 shp (6,300 kW)
- Propulsion: 1 × General Electric or Westinghouse steam turbine; 1 × Screw
- Speed: 18 kn (33 km/h; 21 mph)
- Complement: 646
- Armament: 2 × 4 in (100 mm)/50 caliber guns in single mounts; 8 × 40 mm (1.57 in) Bofors anti-aircraft gun in twin mounts; 21 × 20 mm (0.79 in) Oerlikon cannons in single and twin mounts
- Aircraft carried: 20
- Aviation facilities: Flight deck 442 by 88 feet (135 by 27 m); Hangar 262 by 62 feet (80 by 19 m); 2 × 42-by-34-foot (13 by 10 m) lifts; 9 arrestor wires

The Attacker class were a class of American-built escort aircraft carriers that served with the British Royal Navy during the Second World War.

Having already converted six diesel-powered C3 cargo ships into escort carriers (three of them becoming the British Avenger class), shortly after the Attack on Pearl Harbor the United States Navy earmarked 22 additional C3 vessels, these powered by steam turbines, for conversion into further carriers. While some classify all these ships, and 23 others, as members of the Bogue class, in fact the Bogue class proper consisted only of eleven of the 22, which were retained by the U.S. Navy; while the remaining eleven were transferred to the Royal Navy under the terms of the Lend-Lease program, and were redesignated as the Attacker class. A number of British sources suggest that the three ships built by Seattle-Tacoma Shipbuilding--HMS Ravager, HMS Searcher, and HMS Tracker--should actually be considered part of the succeeding Ruler class, and not as Attackers; but in the absence of a clear consensus we will treat them as part of this class.

The ships were originally intended to serve as convoy escort carriers, equipped with both anti-submarine and fighter aircraft, and transport carriers, transferring new and replacement aircraft to forward bases. After successful use during the amphibious invasion of North Africa to cover advancing ground units until land airbases were secured, several ships were refitted as strike carriers, equipped with just fighter aircraft. When used as convoy escorts, the ships' aircraft were successful in deterring German submarines from attacking Allied convoys, with a number of German submarines and aircraft destroyed or damaged by the aircraft. Those carriers operating in the strike role took part in two major landings in the Mediterranean and an operation against the German battleship Tirpitz in Norwegian waters. Eight of the ships ended the war in the Far East in the campaigns against the Japanese Empire and were then used to transport home prisoners of war.

All eleven ships survived the war and were eventually returned to the United States Navy, which sold eight of them for conversion back into merchant ships. The other three ships were scrapped.

== Design and description ==
The Attacker class vessels were all laid down in 1941 and 1942, with Ingalls Shipbuilding and Western Pipe & Steel building four each and Seattle-Tacoma Shipbuilding Corporation the remaining three. All were supplied to Britain under the terms of the Lend-Lease program.

The ships had a standard complement of 646 officers and ratings. Crew accommodations were significantly different from the normal for the Royal Navy at the time. Instead of food being prepared by separate messes, it was cooked in the galley and served cafeteria-style in a central dining area. As built, they were equipped with air conditioning, a modern laundry and a barber shop, and, in place of the hammocks found in Royal Navy ships, three-tier bunk beds, 18 to a cabin, which were hinged and could be folded up to provide extra space when not in use. One source states that the laundry facilities and ice-cream-making equipment were removed before they entered service.

The ships had a waterline length of 465 ft (142 m) with an overall length of 495 ft 8 in (151.08 m). Their beam was 69 ft 6 in (21.18 m) at the waterline and a maximum beam of 111 ft 6 in (33.99 m). The draught was 24 ft 8 in (7.52 m) at full load and 21 ft (6.4 m) at light load. They displaced 7,800 long tons (7,900 t) at standard load and 14,170 long tons (14,400 t) at full load.

Power was provided by two Foster and Wheeler boilers feeding steam to a General Electric steam turbine engine connected to a single shaft, giving 8,500 bhp (6,300 kW), which could propel the ship at 18 kn (33 km/h; 21 mph).

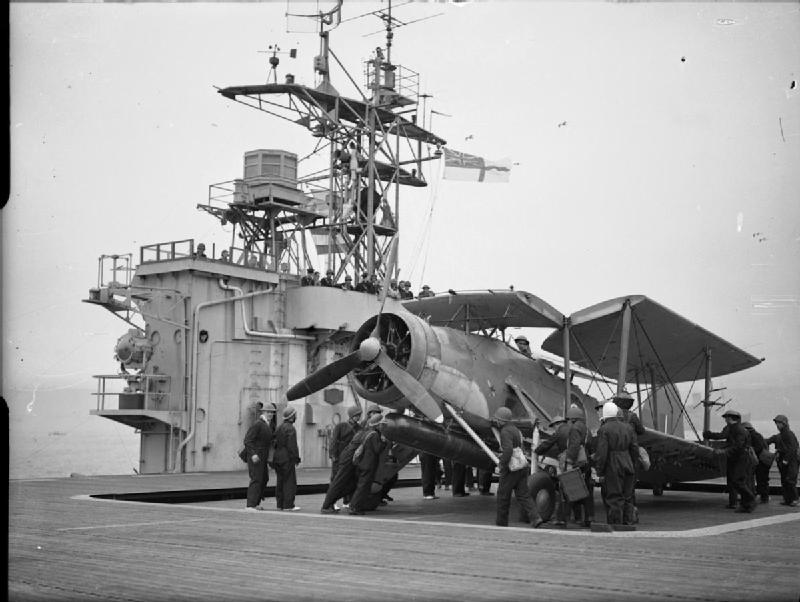
On HMS Battler, a Fairey Swordfish comes on deck via the aircraft lift. The ship's 'Island' bridge and flight control is in the background.

All ships of the class could carry up to 20 anti-submarine or fighter aircraft, which could be a mixture of Hawker Sea Hurricane or Supermarine Seafire (British), or Grumman Wildcat or Vought Corsair (American) fighters, and Fairey Swordfish (British) or Grumman Avenger anti-submarine aircraft. The exact composition of the embarked squadrons depended upon the mission. Some squadrons were composite squadrons for convoy defence, and would be equipped with both anti-submarine and fighter aircraft, while other squadrons working in a strike-carrier role would only be equipped with fighter aircraft. When utilised in ferry service the ships could carry up to 90 aircraft, parked on both the flight and hangar decks. Aircraft facilities consisted of a small (c. 25 ft by 6 ft [7.4 by 1.8 m]) combined bridge–flight control island on the starboard side above a flight deck that measured 442 ft × 88 ft (135 m × 27 m). There were nine arresting wires and three barriers at the stern of the ship, along with one hydraulic catapult at the bow which was able to launch a 3.5 t (3.4 long tons; 3.9 short tons) aircraft at 61 kn (113 km/h; 70 mph). The hangar measured 262 ft × 62 ft (80 m × 19 m), which was larger than previous escort carriers, but retained the sheer of the main deck of the merchant ships they were built on, making it necessary to roll aircraft upslope (with the help of cables and winches) to get them to the elevators at each end. This procedure proved difficult in normal conditions, and impossible in rough seas.

The ships were delivered with 5-inch (130 mm)/51 calibre guns mounted on sponsons located on either side of the stern. Their anti-aircraft (AA) defence nominally consisted of eight 40-millimetre (1.6 in) Bofors AA guns in twin mounts, and eight 20-millimetre (0.79 in) Oerlikon AA cannon in twin and ten in single mounts as the standard fit. In practice all the ships had slightly different weapons mounted. Attacker, Chaser, and Hunter only had four single 20 mm AA cannon, the rest being double mounts. Of the other ships, Battler had two, Stalker had six, and Fencer had seven single 20 mm cannon. Pursuer had four extra 40 mm AA guns, and Striker had six extra in place of twin 20 mm mounts.

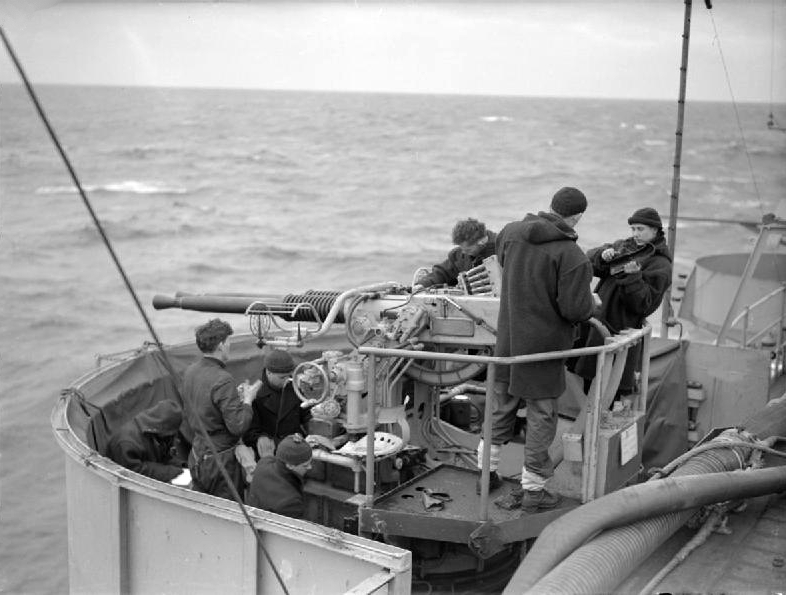
A twin 40 mm Bofors anti-aircraft gun mounting

After arriving in Great Britain, the ships had their 5-inch guns changed out for 4-inch guns of a type which used British-made ammunition; sources differ as to what model of replacement gun was used, with the British-made BL 4-inch Mark IX (45-calibre) single-purpose (surface) gun or one of several marks of US-made, 4-inch/50 caliber gun (which had been supplied to Britain under Lend-Lease) among the suggestions. The ships had their aviation fuel capacity reduced drastically, in the interest of fire safety, from 186,286 US gal (705,170 L; 155,116 imp gal) to 44,800 imp gal (204,000 L; 53,800 US gal), through the replacement of the original large, deep avgas tanks, within which vapors accumulated as they were emptied, with smaller ones which were topped off with seawater or CO_{2} as they were emptied, leaving no space for vapors to form. The smaller tanks could, in turn, be completely immersed in larger, water-filled enclosures, or encased in concrete, to further reduce the possibility of vapor accumulation, increasing safety further. HF/DF ("Huff/Duff") radio direction finders (RDF) were also installed at this time.

== Ships in class ==
Construction data
RN Name	Pennant no.	Name	Builder	Laid down	Launched	Commissioned	Fate
Attacker	D02	Steel Artisan Barnes (ACV-7)	Western Pipe, San Francisco, California	17 April 1941	27 September 1941	10 October 1942	Returned 5 January 1946, later SS Castel Forte
Battler	D18	Mormacmail Altamaha (ACV-6)	Ingalls Shipbuilding, Pascagoula, Mississippi	15 April 1941	4 April 1942	15 November 1942	Scrapped 1946–48
Chaser	D32	Mormacgulf Breton (ACV-10)	Ingalls Shipbuilding, Pascagoula, Mississippi	28 June 1941	15 January 1942	9 April 1943	Returned 12 May 1946, SS Aagtekerk
Fencer	D64	Croatan (ACV-14)	Western Pipe, San Francisco, California	5 September 1941	4 April 1942	20 February 1943	Returned 11 December 1946, SS Sydney
Hunter	D80	Mormacpenn Block Island (ACV-8)	Ingalls Shipbuilding, Pascagoula, Mississippi	15 May 1941	22 May 1942	11 January 1943	Returned 29 December 1946, SS Almdijk
Pursuer	D73	Mormacland St. George (ACV-17)	Ingalls Shipbuilding, Pascagoula, Mississippi	31 July 1941	18 July 1942	14 June 1943	Scrapped 1946–48
Ravager	D70	ACV-24	Seattle-Tacoma Shipbuilding Corporation, Tacoma, Washington	11 April 1942	16 July 1942	25 April 1943	Sold into merchant service as SS Robin Trent. Scrapped in 1973.
Searcher	D40	ACV-22	Seattle-Tacoma Shipbuilding Corporation, Tacoma, Washington	20 February 1942	20 June 1942	7 April 1943	Sold into merchant service as SS Captain Theo. Scrapped in 1976.
Stalker	D91	Hamlin (ACV-14)	Western Pipe, San Francisco, California	6 October 1941	5 March 1942	30 December 1943	Returned 29 December 1945, SS Riouw
Striker	D12	Prince William (ACV-19)	Western Pipe, San Francisco, California	15 December 1941	7 May 1942	29 April 1943	Scrapped 1946–48
Tracker	D24	Mormacmail BACV-6	Seattle-Tacoma Shipbuilding Corporation, Tacoma, Washington	3 November 1941	7 March 1942	31 January 1943	Sold into merchant service as SS Corrientes. Scrapped in 1964.

=== Convoy escorts ===
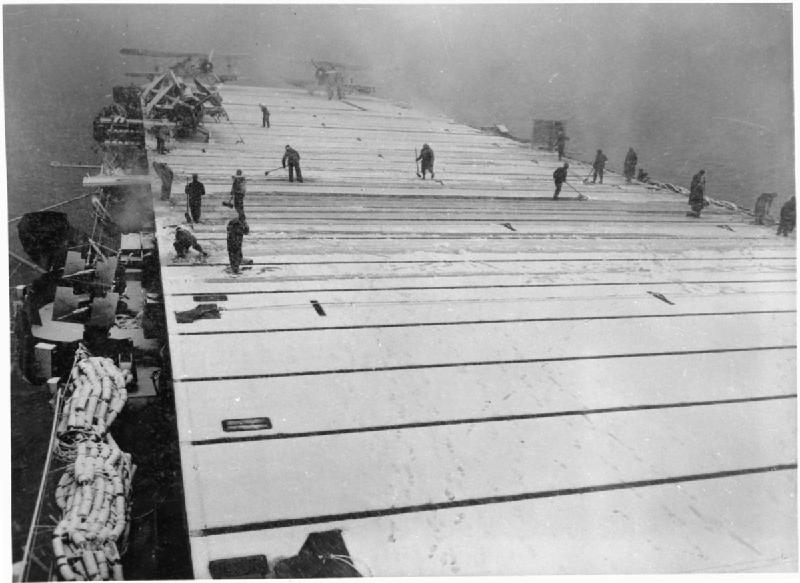
The snow-covered deck of HMS Fencer, May 1944

Escort carriers were designed to accompany other ships, forming the escort for convoys. The anti-submarine aircraft employed were initially Fairey Swordfish and later Grumman Avengers, which could be armed with torpedoes, depth charges, 250-pound (110 kg) bombs, or the RP-3 rocket projectile. As well as carrying out their own attacks on U-boats, these aircraft identified target locations for the convoy's escorts to attack. Typically anti-submarine patrols would be flown between dawn and dusk. One aircraft would fly about 10 miles (16 km) ahead of the convoy, while another patrolled astern. Patrols would last between two and three hours, using both radar and visual observation in their search for U-boats. By 1944, it was usual to have two escort carriers working as a pair on convoy escort. Experience had shown it was best to have two composite squadrons. One squadron included fighters and the by then obsolete Fairey Swordfish equipped with air-to-surface vessel (ASV) radar for night patrols. The other squadron would be equipped with fighters and the Grumman Avenger for long-range day patrols, as they could not be fitted with the ASV radar.

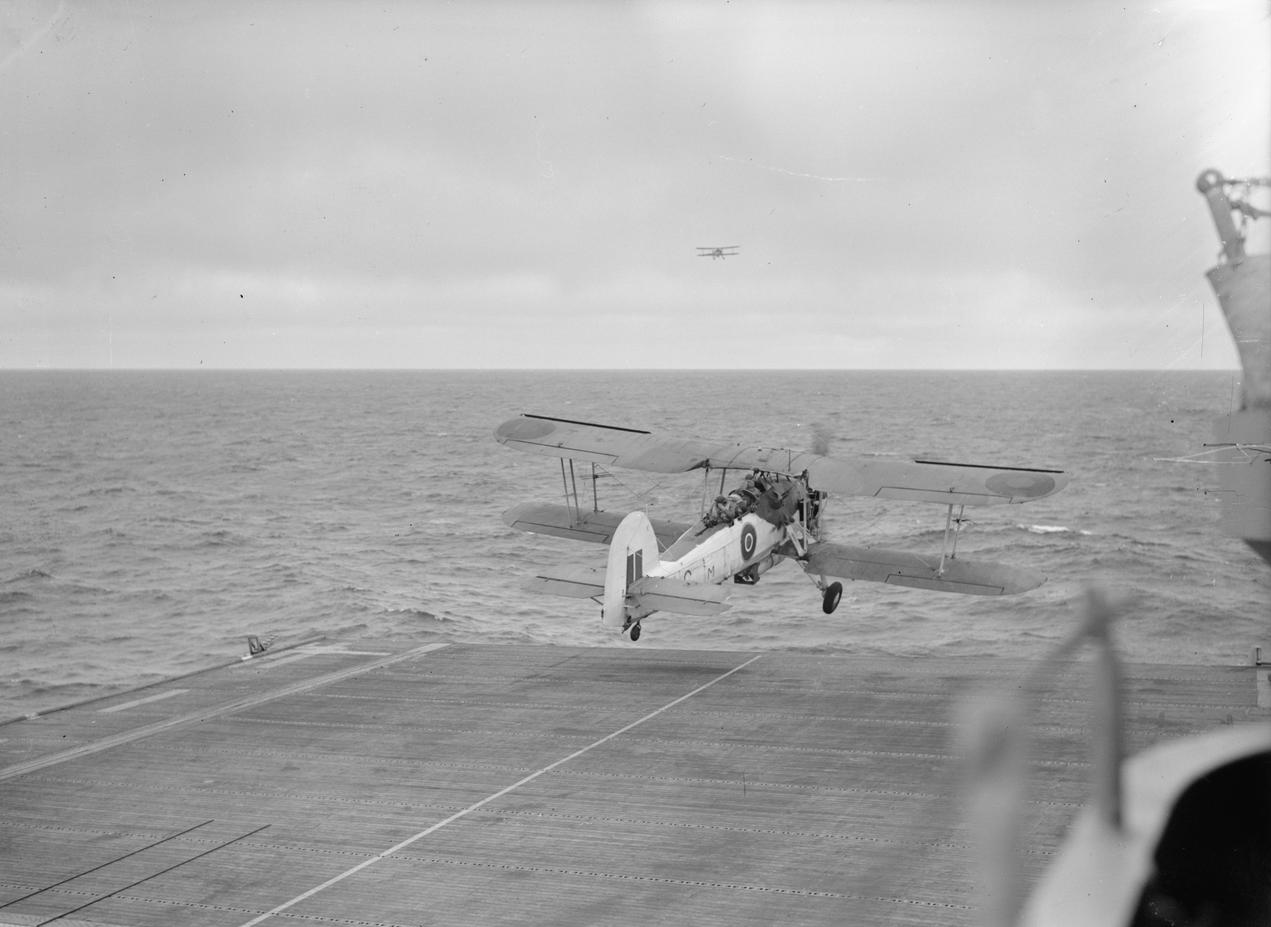
A Fairey Swordfish takes off from Striker on an anti-submarine patrol.

The Fleet Air Arm squadrons flying off the Attacker-class escort carriers did have some successes of their own. The first of six confirmed U-boats destroyed by aircraft flying off Attacker class ships was on 10 February 1944, when two Fairey Swordfish from the 842 Naval Air Squadron on board Fencer sank U-666 west of Iceland. On 4 March, while on Arctic convoy patrol, Fairey Swordfish from 816 Naval Air Squadron on board Chaser so severely damaged U-472 with a salvo of RP-3 rockets that she could not submerge and was sunk by HMS Onslaught. For the rest of the day Chaser's Fairey Swordfish kept the U-boats at bay by identifying their locations to her escorts. They also damaged two other U-boats themselves. The U-366 was sunk by RP-3 rockets fired from a Fairey Swordfish on 5 March, and the U-973 on 6 March. Three other U-boats sighted managed to evade an attack in foggy conditions. Operating from Fencer, 842 Squadron sank their second submarine, U-277, on 1 May, and sank U-959 and U-674 on 2 May 1944.

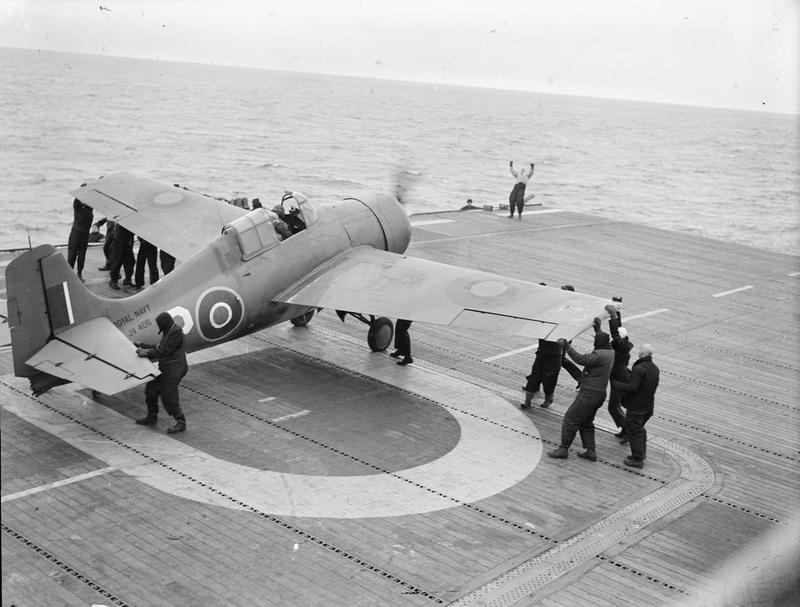
Grumman Wildcat being prepared for take off from Pursuer

The carriers' aircraft could also claim some success against the Luftwaffe's long-range bombers. On 1 December 1943, two Grumman Wildcats from 842 Naval Air Squadron on board Fencer shot down a Focke-Wulf Fw 200 that was shadowing Convoy OS 60. The next confirmed air-to-air success came on 24 February 1944, when four Grumman Wildcats from 881 Naval Air Squadron on board Pursuer were scrambled after the ship's radar had identified at least three aircraft approaching. The approaching bombers consisted of a mixed force of seven Focke-Wulf Fw 200 and Heinkel He 177s carrying glider bombs. One Fw 200 and one He 177 were shot down by Grumman Wildcats. The rest of the Germans kept their distance due to the combined efforts of the fighters and the ships' anti-aircraft fire. Off Cape Finisterre in March 1944, Grumman Wildcat fighters from Pursuer shot down a Heinkel He 177 and a Focke-Wulf Fw 200, and damaged a Fw 200.See also

In August 1944, the Arctic convoys had started again, the first one being escorted by Striker and HMS Vindex, a British-built escort carrier. On board Striker was 824 Naval Air Squadron with twelve Fairey Swordfish IIs, ten Grumman Wildcat Vs, and two spares. The Grumman Wildcats shot down a Blohm & Voss BV 138 on 22 August. For Operation Neptune from 5 June 1944 to the middle of the month, five all-fighter escort carriers, including Fencer, provided air cover to protect the anti-submarine groups on the flanks of the Normandy invasion fleet.

=== Strike operations ===
Supermarine Seafire flying above HMS Royalist

During the Salerno landings, Force V, commanded by Admiral Philip Vian and consisting of Attacker, Battler, Hunter, and Stalker, along with the light fleet carrier Unicorn, provided air cover. The five carriers were expected to keep a fighter aircraft force of 22 Supermarine Seafires over the landing area until the ground forces had seized an Italian airfield for use by ground-based aircraft. On the first day, 9 September 1943, they flew 265 sorties. They had expected to be relieved by 10 September, but a suitable airfield was not captured until 12 September. Of the carriers' 105 fighters, ten were lost in action and 33 written off in accidents. In exchange, they claimed two German aircraft destroyed and four others probably destroyed. For the landings in the south of France on 15 August 1944, Attacker, Stalker, and Hunter, each equipped with 24 Supermarine Seafires and Pursuer, with 24 Grumman Wildcats, formed part of the aircraft carrier force dubbed Task Force 88.

The success of the Allied navies against U-boats in the Atlantic forced the Germans to move some of them into the Indian Ocean. To counter this threat, a task force was formed with HMS Battler, the cruisers Suffolk and Newcastle, and the destroyers Quadrant and Roebuck. Their objective was to locate and destroy the U-boats and their supply ships and protect the shipping lanes between India, Aden, and South Africa. In March 1944, one of Battler's planes sighted the German supply ship Brake and three surfaced U-boats. They guided the Roebuck to the supply ship, which was scuttled by her captain. The three U-boats submerged before the start of the action.

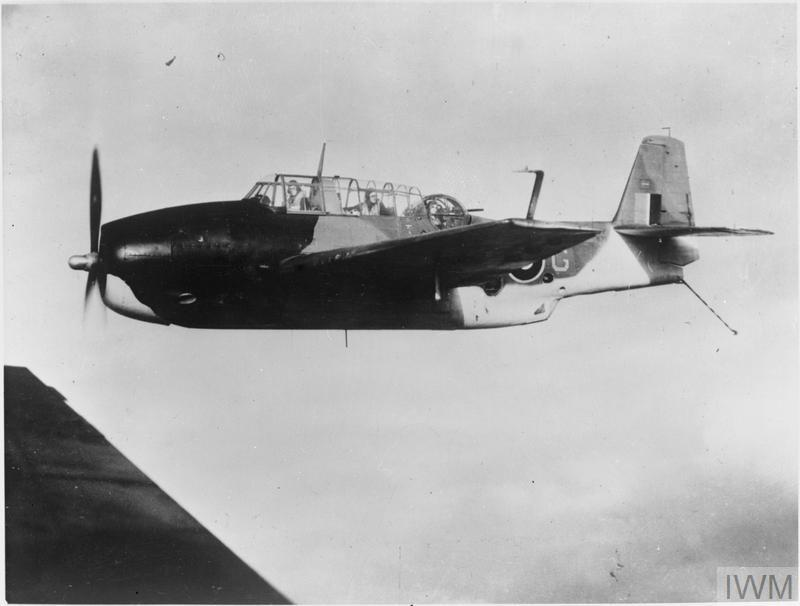
A Grumman Avenger returning from the Bodø shipping raid

In April 1944, aircraft from Fencer and Pursuer took part in Operation Tungsten: the attack on the German battleship Tirpitz in the Kaafjord and at Tromsø. Fairey Barracuda bombers from HMS Victorious were escorted by Supermarine Seafires, Vought Corsairs, Grumman Hellcats, and from the two escort carriers, Grumman Wildcats. The Hellcats carried out attacks on the anti-aircraft defences and the Wildcats attacked the Tirpitz with machine gun fire, just prior to the Fairey Barracudas bombing run. Tirpitz was hit multiple times during the attack, killing over 100, and wounding over 300, of her crew. There was some damage to her superstructure but no bombs pierced the armoured deck.See also

On 26 April 1944, Pursuer's aircraft successfully attacked a German convoy off Bodø in northern Norway. The convoy consisted of four merchant ships and five escorts; of these, all the merchant ships and one of the escorts were bombed and three of the merchant ships were set on fire. At the same time, other aircraft bombed and set on fire a large merchant ship at Bodø Harbour.See also

On 6 May 1944, while on an anti-shipping sweep in the same area, Grumman Wildcats of 882 Naval Air Squadron from Searcher shot down two Blohm & Voss BV 138 seaplanes.

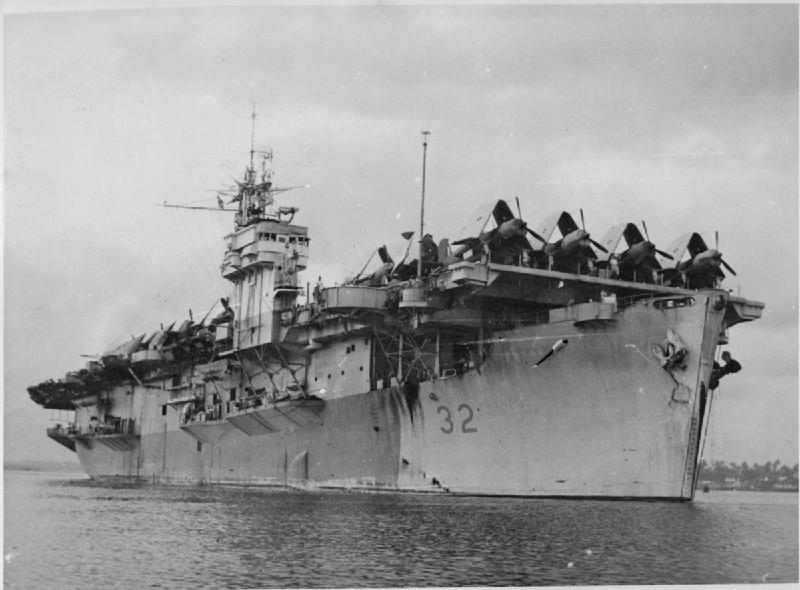
Chaser's flight deck is being used to transport replacement aircraft forward

Early in 1944, the trend was for the strike carrier to move eastwards. Firstly Attacker, Hunter, and Pursuer were sent to the Aegean Sea to conduct operations against Axis garrisons in the area. They then moved to the Indian Ocean, joining Fencer and Stalker in supporting the Allied armies in Burma. Here they supported the Fourteenth Army amphibious landings and interdicted Japanese shipping in the Bay of Bengal and the Straits of Malacca. As the war in the east progressed, the British and U.S. Pacific fleets combined. Two more Attacker-class ships arrived in the area, Chaser and Striker. These were used to ferry replacement aircraft for the other carriers, and after the Japanese surrender were given another role: repatriating prisoners of war.

When the war was over, the surviving Lend-Lease ships were returned to the U.S. Navy, which now had a surplus of these ships, so some were sold into merchant service. HMS Attacker became Costel Forte, HMS Chaser Aagtekerk, HMS Fencer Sydney, HMS Hunter Almdijk, HMS Ravager Robin Trent, HMS Searcher Captain Theo, HMS Stalker Rionw, and HMS Tracker Corrientes. The other three Attacker-class ships, HMS Battler, HMS Pursuer, and HMS Striker, were not sold into merchant service; all three were scrapped between 1946 and 1948.

== Battle honours ==
All eleven ships were awarded battle honours by the Royal Navy.

- HMS Attacker: Atlantic 1943–1944, Salerno 1943, South France 1944, Aegean 1944
- HMS Battler: Atlantic 1942–1945, Salerno 1943
- HMS Chaser: Atlantic 1943, Arctic 1944, Okinawa 1945
- HMS Fencer: Atlantic 1943–1944, Norway 1944, Arctic 1944
- HMS Hunter: Atlantic 1942–1944, Salerno 1943, South France 1944, Aegean 1944, Burma 1945, Malaya 1945
- HMS Pursuer: Atlantic 1943–1945, Norway 1944, Normandy 1944, South France 1944, Aegean 1944, Atlantic 1944, Norway 1945, Arctic 1945
- HMS Ravager: Atlantic 1943
- HMS Searcher: Atlantic 1943–1944, South France 1944, Aegean 1944, Norway 1944–1945
- HMS Stalker: Atlantic 1943–1944, Salerno 1943, South France 1944, Aegean 1944, Burma 1945
- HMS Striker: Atlantic 1943–1944, Arctic 1944, Norway 1944, Okinawa 1945
- HMS Tracker: Atlantic 1943–1944, Arctic 1944, Normandy 1944
