= 816 Naval Air Squadron =

Defunct flying squadron of the Royal Navy's Fleet Air Arm

- 816 NAS badge
- Active: 1939–1941; 1942–1944; 1945–1948
- Disbanded: 1 July 1948
- Country: United Kingdom
- Branch: Royal Navy
- Type: Torpedo Bomber Reconnaissance squadron
- Role: Carrier-based: anti-submarine warfare (ASW); anti-surface warfare (ASuW)
- Part of: Fleet Air Arm
- Home station: See Naval air stations section for full list.
- Motto: 'Imitate the action of the tiger' (Shakespeare - Henry V Act Ill Scene i)
- Aircraft: See Aircraft operated section for full list.
- Engagements: World War II: Battles of Narvik; Norwegian campaign; Malta convoys; Battle of the Atlantic; Arctic convoys of World War II; Operation Neptune
- Battle honours: Norway 1940; Narvik 1940; Malta Convoys 1941; Mediterranean 1941; Atlantic 1943; Arctic 1944; Normandy 1944

Insignia
- Squadron Badge Description: Blue, the head of an Indian tiger mouth agape affronty proper (1945)
- Identification markings: U4A+, later 4A+ (Swordfish); 5A+ (Swordfish November 1914); single letters (Swordfish February 1942); single letters (Wildcat/Barracuda/Firefly); O6A+ (Firefly); 200-215 (Firefly 1947)
- Fin Carrier Code: O (Firefly 1947)

816 Naval Air Squadron (816 NAS), also called 816 Squadron, is an inactive Fleet Air Arm (FAA) naval air squadron of the United Kingdom's Royal Navy (RN) which last operated the Fairey Firefly FR.I fighter and reconnaissance aircraft within the Royal Navy and last embarked in the Colossus-class light fleet carrier HMS Ocean.

It was first formed in March 1939, aboard the aircraft carrier HMS Furious, to support anti-submarine and strike missions for North Atlantic convoys. It conducted the first aerial torpedo attack of the war during the Norwegian Campaign in April 1940. An attack on the German battlecruiser Scharnhorst was attempted in September 1940, and the squadron joined RAF Coastal Command in March 1941 for operations along the Dutch and French coasts. The squadron re-embarked on HMS Furious in June 1941 to provide anti-submarine cover while RAF aircraft were sent to Malta. On the return trip, it transferred to HMS Ark Royal and stayed with her until she sank in November 1941

It was reformed in February 1942, in Palisadoes, Jamaica, as a TBR squadron that joined HMS Avenger to escort a convoy from the US to the UK. The squadron subsequently joined HMS Dasher in February 1943 for Arctic convoy escort but faced heavy losses when the ship exploded in March 1943, during exercises in the Firth of Clyde. It regrouped at RNAS Machrihanish with new aircraft and by May 1943 was able to target German shipping in the English Channel. Later the squadron then embarked on HMS Tracker for North Atlantic convoys. In March, an aircraft assisted the destroyer HMS Onslaught in sinking a German U-boat, followed by further operations in the days that followed.

It took part in operations in the English Channel to support the Normandy landings. Disbanded at RAF Perranporth in August 1944, it reformed at RNAS Lee-on-Solent in February 1945, as a torpedo bomber reconnaissance squadron on a light fleet carrier and stayed active until 1948.

In 1948 it was re-formed as 816 Squadron RAN a Royal Australian Navy, Fleet Air Arm (RAN) squadron with Fairey Firefly and embarked on HMAS Sydney.

== History ==
=== Torpedo, Bomber, Reconnaissance Squadron (1939-1941) ===
816 Naval Air Squadron was established on 3 October 1939, aboard the Courageous-class battlecruiser, converted to an aircraft carrier, HMS Furious, equipped with nine Fairey Swordfish biplane torpedo bombers. Its primary mission was to deliver anti-submarine warfare capabilities and strike support for convoys traversing the North Atlantic.

In April 1940, the vessel participated in military operations aimed at defending Norway. Notably, on 11 April, it executed the first airborne torpedo assault of the conflict, as eighteen aircraft from 816 and 818 Naval Air Squadrons targeted two Destroyers located in Trondheim Fjord.

The squadron initiated its transition to floatplanes in May; however, the evacuation of France necessitated a revision of this strategy. It temporarily conducted operations from Jersey Airport, also known as RNAS Jersey. On 4 June, nine Fairey Swordfish aircraft from the Torpedo, Bomber, and Reconnaissance Squadron arrived from RNAS Ford (HMS Peregrine), Sussex, for a week of operations, remaining until 11.

In June 1940, the unit re-boarded the aircraft carrier. An assault was launched against the German battlecruiser Scharnhorst in September 1940, and on September 22, 1940, five aircraft were lost during an operation targeting shipping at Trondheim and on 16 October, a night-time aerial assault targeted the fuel storage facilities located in Tromsø.

The squadron joined RAF Coastal Command in March 1941, engaging in operations along the coasts of the Netherlands and France. In April 1941, three aircraft were assigned to RAF Detling, Kent, where they established 816X Flight, which subsequently served as the foundation for 821 Naval Air Squadron. In June 1941, the squadron re-boarded the aircraft carrier HMS Furious to deliver anti-submarine protection while RAF aircraft were transported to Malta.

In July, it was assigned to the aircraft carrier HMS Ark Royal, where it operated in the Mediterranean until the carrier was torpedoed on 13 November. Subsequently, the remaining elements of the squadron were integrated into 812 Naval Air Squadron, leading to the disbandment of 816 Naval Air Squadron.

=== Torpedo, Bomber, Reconnaissance Squadron (1942-1944) ===
The squadron was reformed at RNAS Palisadoes (HMS Buzzard), Jamaica, on 1 February 1942, equipped with four Fairey Swordfish I aircraft. The unit was transferred to the RN Air Section Norfolk, located at USNAS Norfolk in Virginia, on 22 March 1942, and subsequently boarded the name ship of her class of escort carrier, HMS Avenger on 3 May 1942.

Just after 5 am on 4 May, HMS Avenger deployed two Fairey Swordfish aircraft for a dawn patrol mission. By 9 am, the aircraft had not returned, prompting the dispatch of the USS Rowan to conduct a search approximately 10 miles (16 km) behind the convoy. Unfortunately, no evidence of the aircraft or the six crew members was discovered. It was suspected that adverse weather conditions and limited visibility hindered their ability to locate the carrier, leading them to ditch the aircraft after exhausting their fuel supply. Continued poor weather conditions precluded any further flight operations during the passage. HMS Avenger ultimately reached the Clyde on 11 May, while 816 Naval Air Squadron proceeded to RNAS Lee-on-Solent (HMS Daedalus), Hampshire, for re-equipment.

Following the re-equipping with six Fairey Swordfish II aircraft and subsequent working up, the squadron conducted night operations in the English Channel from September to December, under the auspices of RAF Coastal Command. In February 1943, the squadron was assigned to the Avenger-class escort carrier HMS Dasher for the purpose of supporting North Russian convoy missions. However, on 27 March 1943, the vessel suffered a catastrophic explosion in the Clyde due to an accident, resulting in significant casualties, including the loss of the squadron's commanding officer, Lieutenant R.C.B. Stallard-Penoyre.

816 Naval Air Squadron reassembled at RNAS Machrihanish (HMS Landrail) in Argyll and Bute, where it was equipped with six new Fairey Swordfish II aircraft. In May, the squadron conducted operations targeting German shipping in the English Channel. By June, it relocated to RNAS Fearn (HMS Owl) in Ross and Cromarty, where it integrated half of 895 Naval Air Squadron to establish a fighter flight, utilising six Supermarine Seafire L Mk.IIc fighter aircraft.

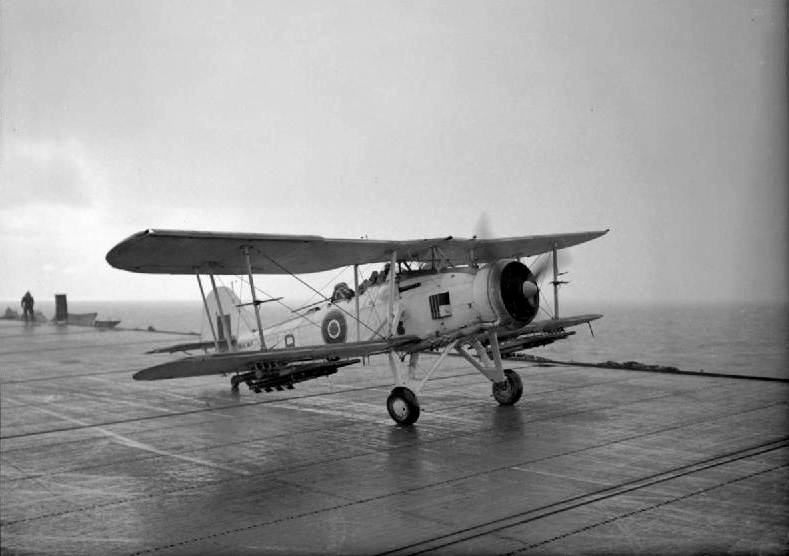
Fairey Swordfish of 816 NAS taking off from HMS Tracker

Subsequently, these aircraft were reassigned to 897 Naval Air Squadron. Following this, the squadron received six Supermarine Seafire Mk.Ib aircraft and there was an increase in the number of Fairey Swordfish from six to nine. The squadron then embarked on Attacker-class escort carrier, HMS Tracker to participate in North Atlantic convoy operations. The Supermarine Seafire were replaced by Grumman Wildcat Mk IV fighter aircraft with in January 1944, after which the squadron was transferred to sister ship, HMS Chaser to serve in the Arctic convoys.

On 4 March, aircraft 'B' assisted HMS Onslaught in the sinking of the German submarine U-472. In the subsequent days, the aircraft of the squadron successfully sank both the German submarines U-366 and U-973. The Grumman Wildcat aircraft were reallocated to assist in the establishment of 833 Naval Air Squadron. Subsequently, the number of Fairey Swordfish aircraft rose to twelve. Utilising this increased strength, the squadron conducted operations in the English Channel in collaboration with RAF Coastal Command, during the Normandy invasion, until their disbandment at RAF Perranporth, Cornwall, in August.

=== Torpedo, Bomber, Reconnaissance Squadron (1945-1948) ===
816 Naval Air Squadron reformed at RNAS Lee-on-Solent (HMS Daedalus), Hampshire, on 1 February 1945, with eighteen Fairey Barracuda Mk II, a torpedo and dive bomber, designated for torpedo bomber reconnaissance operations, aboard a light fleet carrier.

The objective was to embark in a Colossus-class aircraft carrier with a diminished capacity of twelve aircraft, contributing to the formation of the anticipated 20th Carrier Air Group. However, in July 1945, it underwent re-equipment with twelve Fairey Firefly FR.I, a carrier-borne fighter and anti-submarine aircraft.

In May 1946, a Night Fighter Unit known as Black Flight, equipped with four Fairey Firefly NF.Mk I night fighter variant was attached to the unit and subsequently joined HMS Ocean for deployment in the Mediterranean as part of the 20th Carrier Air Group. By November 1946, the Night Fighter Unit was reassigned, but it reverted to 816 Naval Air Squadron in January 1947. HMS Ocean made its return to the United Kingdom at the conclusion of June 1948, leading to the disbandment of 816 Naval Air Squadron at RNAS Lee-on-Solent on 1 July 1948.

== Aircraft operated ==
The squadron has operated a number of different aircraft types, including:

- Fairey Swordfish I torpedo bomber (October 1939 - October 1942)
- Fairey Swordfish II torpedo bomber (June 1942 - August 1944)
- Supermarine Seafire L.Mk IIc fighter aircraft (July - August 1943)
- Supermarine Seafire Mk Ib fighter aircraft (August - December 1943)
- Grumman Wildcat Mk V fighter aircraft (January - April 1944)
- Fairey Barracuda Mk II torpedo and dive bomber (February - July 1945)
- Fairey Firefly FR.I fighter and reconnaissance aircraft (July 1945 - June 1948)
- Fairey Firefy NF.Mk I night fighter (May 1946 - June 1948)

== Battle honours ==
The battle honours awarded to 816 Naval Air Squadron are:

- Narvik 1940
- Norway 1940
- Malta Convoys 1941
- Mediterranean 1941
- Atlantic 1943
- Arctic 1944
- Normandy 1944

== Assignments ==
816 Naval Air Squadron was assigned as needed to form part of a number of larger units:

- 20th Carrier Air Group (March 1946 - 1 July 1948)

== Naval air stations and aircraft carriers ==
816 Naval Air Squadron operated from a number of naval air stations of the Royal Navy and Royal Air Force stations, in the UK and overseas, and also a number of Royal Navy fleet carriers and escort carriers and other airbases overseas:

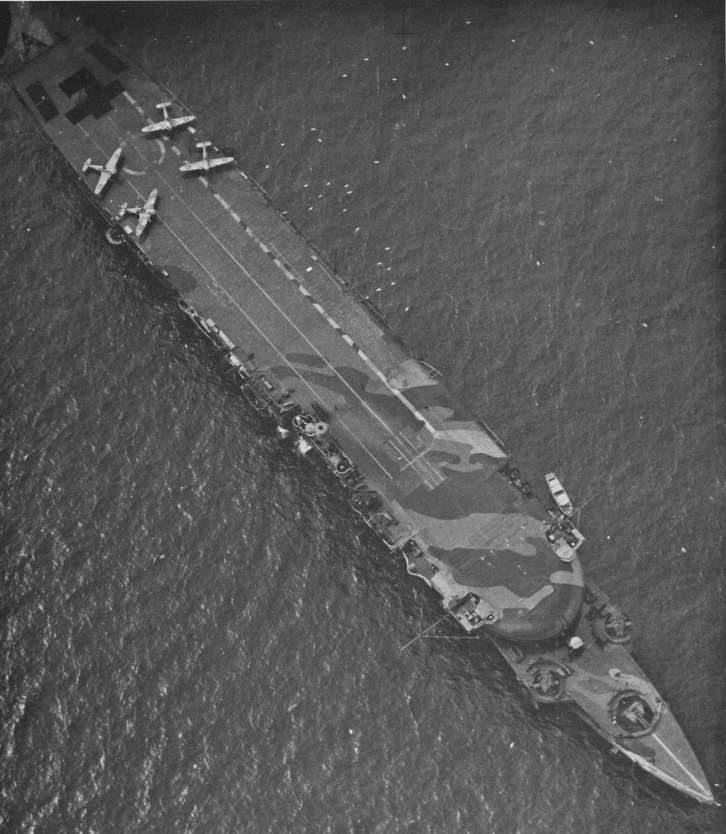
Aerial view of HMS Furious

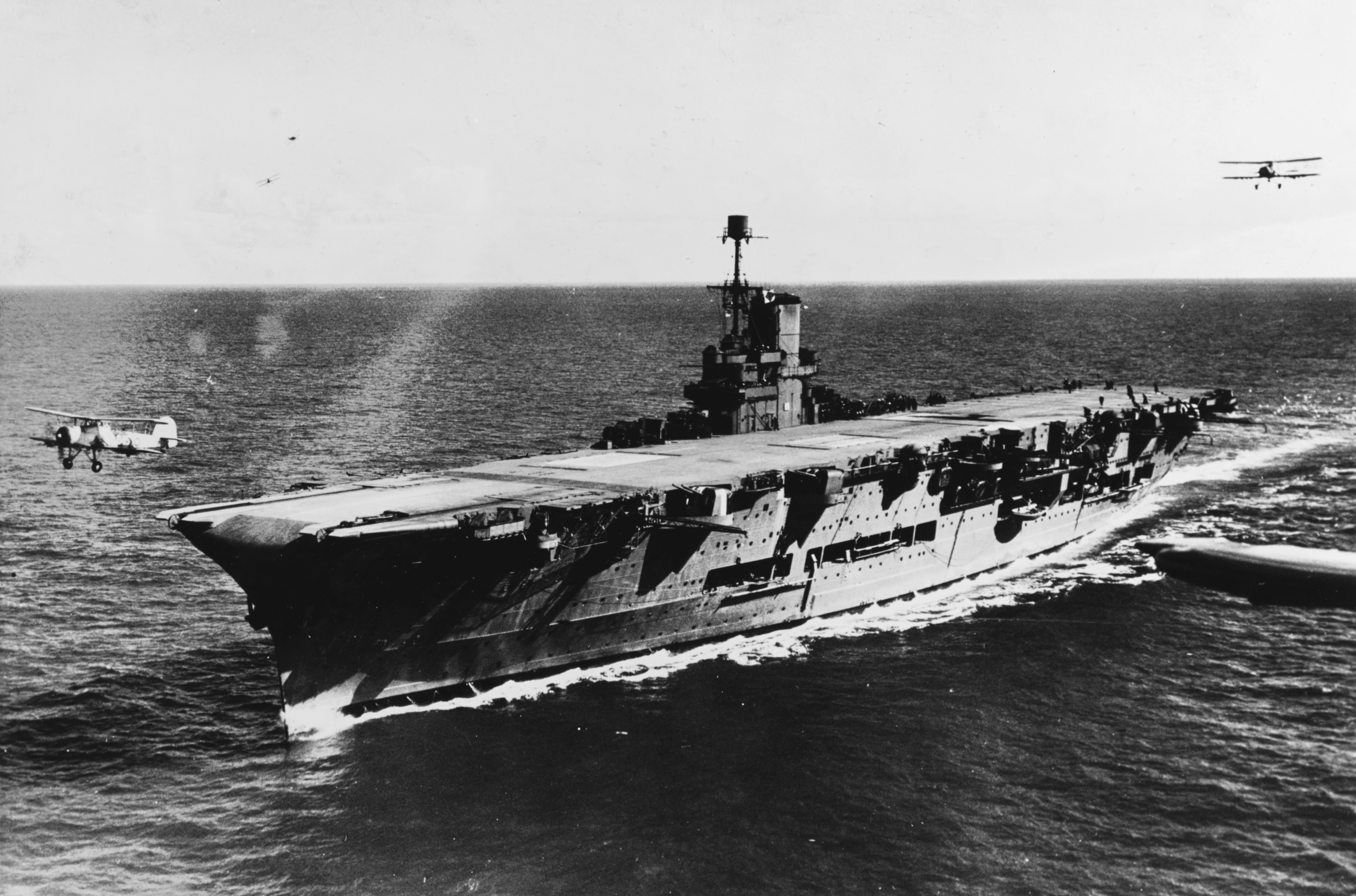
HMS Ark Royal

1939 - 1941

- HMS Furious (3 - 13 October 1939)
- HMS Ark Royal (13 - 17 October 1939)
- Royal Naval Air Station Hatston (HMS Sparrowhawk), Mainland, Orkney, (17 - 18 October 1939)
- HMS Furious (18 October - 17 December 1939)
- Royal Naval Air Station Abbotsinch (HMS Sanderling), Renfrewshire, (17 - 25 December 1939)
- HMS Furious (25 December 1939 - 4 January 1940)
- Royal Naval Air Station Abbotsinch (HMS Sanderling), Renfrewshire, (4 January - 19 February 1940)
- Royal Naval Air Station Campbeltown, Argyll and Bute, (19 February - 9 April 1940)
- HMS Furious (9 - 28 April 1940)
- Royal Naval Air Station Campbeltown, Argyll and Bute, (28 April - 3 May 1940)
- Royal Naval Air Station Donibristle (HMS Merlin), Fife, (3 - 17 May 1940)
- Royal Naval Air Station Campbeltown, Argyll and Bute, (17 - 31 May 1940)
- Royal Naval Air Station Ford (HMS Peregrine), West Sussex, (31 May - 4 June 1940)
- Royal Naval Air Station Jersey, Jersey, (4 - 11 June 1940)
- Royal Naval Air Station Ford (HMS Peregrine), West Sussex, (11 - 14 June 1940)
- HMS Furious (14 June - 13 September 1940)
  - Royal Air Force Prestwick, South Ayrshire, (Detachment 11–13 September 1940)
  - Royal Air Force Bircham Newton, Norfolk, (Detachment three aircraft 1–6 July 1940)
- Royal Naval Air Station Hatston (HMS Sparrowhawk), Mainland, Orkney, (13 - 20 September 1940)
- HMS Furious (20 - 25 September 1940)
- Royal Naval Air Station Hatston (HMS Sparrowhawk), Mainland, Orkney, (25 - 28 September 1940)
- HMS Furious (28 September - 7 November 1940)
  - Royal Air Force Evanton, Ross and Cromarty, (Detachment six aircraft 25 October - 7 November 1940)
- Royal Naval Air Station Campbeltown, Argyll and Bute, (7 November 1940 - 15 March 1941)
- Royal Air Force North Coates (16 Gp), Lincolnshire, (15 March - 2 May 1941)
  - Royal Air Force Detling, Kent, (Detachment two aircraft 12 March - 4 April 1941)
  - Royal Air Force St Eval, Cornwall, (Detachment nine aircraft 5–15 April 1941)
  - Royal Naval Air Station Campbeltown (HMS Landrail), Argyll and Bute, (Detachment 15–18 April 1941)
  - Royal Air Force Detling, Kent, (Detachment two aircraft 11–16 June 1941)
    - 'X' Flight: Royal Air Force Detling, Kent, (23 April - 1 July 1941)
    - became 821 Naval Air Squadron (1 July 1941)
- Royal Air Force Thorney Island, West Sussex, (2 - 9 May 1941)
- Royal Air Force St Eval (19 Gp), Cornwall, (9 - 11 May 1941)
- Royal Air Force Thorney Island, West Sussex, (11 May - 4 June 1941)
- Royal Naval Air Station Eastleigh (HMS Raven), Hampshire, (4 - 14 June 1941)
- Royal Naval Air Station Abbotsinch (HMS Sanderling), Renfrewshire, (14 - 21 June 1941)
- HMS Furious (21 June - 1 July 1941)
- HMS Ark Royal (1 July - 13 November 1941)
- ship sunk (13 November 1941)

1942 - 1944

- Royal Naval Air Station Palisadoes (HMS Buzzard), Jamaica, (1 February - 22 March 1942)
- Naval Air Station Norfolk, Virginia, (22 March - 3 May 1942)
- HMS Avenger (3 - 11 May 1942)
- Royal Naval Air Station Lee-on-Solent (HMS Daedalus), Hampshire, (11 May - 29 June 1942)
- Royal Naval Air Station Machrihanish (HMS Landrail), Argyll and Bute, (29 June - 7 September 1942)
- Royal Air Force Thorney Island (16 Gp), West Sussex, (7 September - 30 December 1942)
- Royal Naval Air Station Machrihanish (HMS Landrail), Argyll and Bute, (30 December 1942 - 2 February 1943)
- HMS Dasher (2 - 26 February 1943)
- Royal Naval Air Station Hatston (HMS Sparrowhawk), Mainland, Orkney, (26 February - 21 March 1943)
- HMS Dasher (21 - 27 March 1943)
- ship sunk, Royal Naval Air Station Machrihanish (HMS Landrail), Argyll and Bute, (27 March - 20 April 1943)
- Royal Naval Air Station Lee-on-Solent (HMS Daedalus), Hampshire, (20 April - 20 May 1943)
- Royal Air Force Exeter (10 Gp), Devon, (20 May - 25 June 1943)
- Royal Naval Air Station Fearn (HMS Owl), Scottish Highlands, (25 June - 8 July 1943)
- Royal Naval Air Station Machrihanish (HMS Landrail), Argyll and Bute, (8 July - 1 August 1943)
- Royal Naval Air Station Maydown (HMS Shrike), County Londonderry, (1 - 13 August 1943)
- HMS Tracker (13 August - 6 October 1943)
- Royal Naval Air Station Machrihanish (HMS Landrail), Argyll and Bute, (6 - 17 October 1943)
- HMS Tracker (17 October - 14 November 1943)
- Naval Station Argentia, Newfoundland, (14 - 22 November 1943)
- HMS Tracker (22 November - 28 December 1943)
- Royal Naval Air Station Donibristle (HMS Merlin), Fife, (28 December 1943 - 19 January 1944)
- HMS Chaser (19 January - 12 February 1944)
- Royal Naval Air Station Hatston (HMS Sparrowhawk), Mainland, Orkney, (12 - 16 February 1944)
- HMS Chaser (16 February - 16 March 1944)
- Royal Naval Air Station Donibristle (HMS Merlin), Fife, (16 - 31 March 1944)
  - Fighter Flight:
    - Royal Naval Air Station Eglinton (HMS Gannet), County Londonderry, (26 January - 16 February 1944)
    - HMS Chaser (16 February - 16 March 1944)
    - Royal Naval Air Station Hatston (HMS Sparrowhawk), Mainland, Orkney, (16 - 21 March 1944)
    - Royal Naval Air Station Donibristle (HMS Merlin), Fife, (21 March - 17 April 1944)
    - HMS Activity (17 April 1944, to 833 Naval Air Squadron 26 April 1944)
- Royal Naval Air Station Machrihanish (HMS Merlin), Fife, (31 March - 17 April 1944)
- Royal Naval Air Station Crail (HMS Jackdaw), Fife, (17 - 20 April 1944)
- Royal Air Force Perranporth (19 Gp), Cornwall, Royal Naval Air Station St Merryn (HMS Vulture), Cornwall, (20 April - 7 August 1944)
- disbanded (7 August 1944)

1945 - 1948

- Royal Naval Air Station Lee-on-Solent (HMS Daedalus), Hampshire, (1 February - 13 March 1945)
- Royal Naval Air Station Fearn (HMS Owl), Scottish Highlands, (13 March - 1 July 1945)
  - Royal Naval Air Station Machrihanish (HMS Landrail), Argyll and Bute, (Detachment three aircraft 10–18 May 1945)
- Royal Naval Air Station Woodvale (HMS Ringtail II), Merseyside, (1 July - 11 August 1945)
- Royal Naval Air Station Inskip (HMS Nightjar), Lancashire, (11 August - 11 October 1945)
- Royal Naval Air Station Machrihanish (HMS Landrail), Argyll and Bute, (11 October - 23 November 1945)
- HMS Nairana (Deck Landing Training 23 November - 16 December 1945)
- Royal Naval Air Station Machrihanish (HMS Landrail), Argyll and Bute, (16 December 1945 - 9 February 1946)
- Royal Naval Air Station Lee-on-Solent (HMS Daedalus), Hampshire, (transit) (9 - 11 February 1946)
- HMS Theseus (11 - 13 February 1946)
- Royal Naval Air Station Lee-on-Solent (HMS Daedalus), Hampshire, (13 February - 25 April 1946)
- HMS Theseus (25 April - 2 May 1946)
- Royal Naval Air Station Lee-on-Solent (HMS Daedalus), Hampshire, (2 May - 19 June 1946)
- HMS Ocean (19 June - 4 August 1946)
- Royal Naval Air Station Hal Far (HMS Falcon), Malta, (4 August - 18 September 1946)
- HMS Ocean (18 September - 15 November 1946)
- Royal Naval Air Station Hal Far (HMS Falcon), Malta, (15 November - 27 December 1946)
- HMS Ocean (27 December 1946 - 15 March 1947)
- Royal Naval Air Station Hal Far (HMS Falcon), Malta, (15 March - 5 June 1947)
- HMS Ocean (5 June - 22 August 1947)
- Royal Naval Air Station Hal Far (HMS Falcon), Malta, (22 August - 2 October 1947)
- HMS Ocean (2 October - 11 November 1947)
- Royal Naval Air Station Hal Far (HMS Falcon), Malta, (11 November 1947 - 15 January 1948)
- HMS Ocean (15 January - 20 April 1948)
- Royal Naval Air Station Hal Far (HMS Falcon), Malta, (20 April - 7 May 1948)
- HMS Ocean (7 - 18 May 1948)
- Royal Naval Air Station Hal Far (HMS Falcon), Malta, (18 May - 14 June 1948)
- HMS Ocean (14 - 28 June 1948)
- Royal Naval Air Station Lee-on-Solent (HMS Daedalus), Hampshire, (28 June - 1 July 1948)
- disbanded - (1 July 1948)

== Commanding officers ==
List of commanding officers of 816 Naval Air Squadron, with date of appointment:

1939 - 1941

- Lieutenant J. Dalyell-Stead, RN, 13 October 1939
- Lieutenant Commander H.H. Gardner, RN, from 19 October 1939
- Lieutenant Commander T.G.C. Jameson, RN, from 6 May 1940
- disbanded - 13 November 1941

1942 - 1944

- Captain O. Patch, RM, from 1 February 1942
- Lieutenant R.C.B. Stallard-Penoyre, RN, from 15 October 1942 (DoWS 27 March 1943)
- Lieutenant P.F. Pryor, RN, from 28 March 1943
- Lieutenant Commander(A) A.S. Whitworth, DSC, RN, from 17 June 1943
- Lieutenant Commander(A) F.C. Nottingham, DSC, RNVR, from 12 July 1943
- Lieutenant Commander P. Snow, RN, from 3 May 1944
- disbanded - 7 August 1944

1945 - 1948

- Lieutenant Commander The Hon W.A.C. Keppel, DSC, RN, from 1 February 1945
- Lieutenant Commander J.S.L. Crabbe, RN, from 26 June 1945
- Lieutenant Commander(A) S. Hook, RN, from 6 January 1947
- disbanded - 1 July 1948

Note: Abbreviation (A) signifies Air Branch of the RN or RNVR.
