= 835 Naval Air Squadron =

Inactive flying squadron of the Royal Navy's Fleet Air Arm

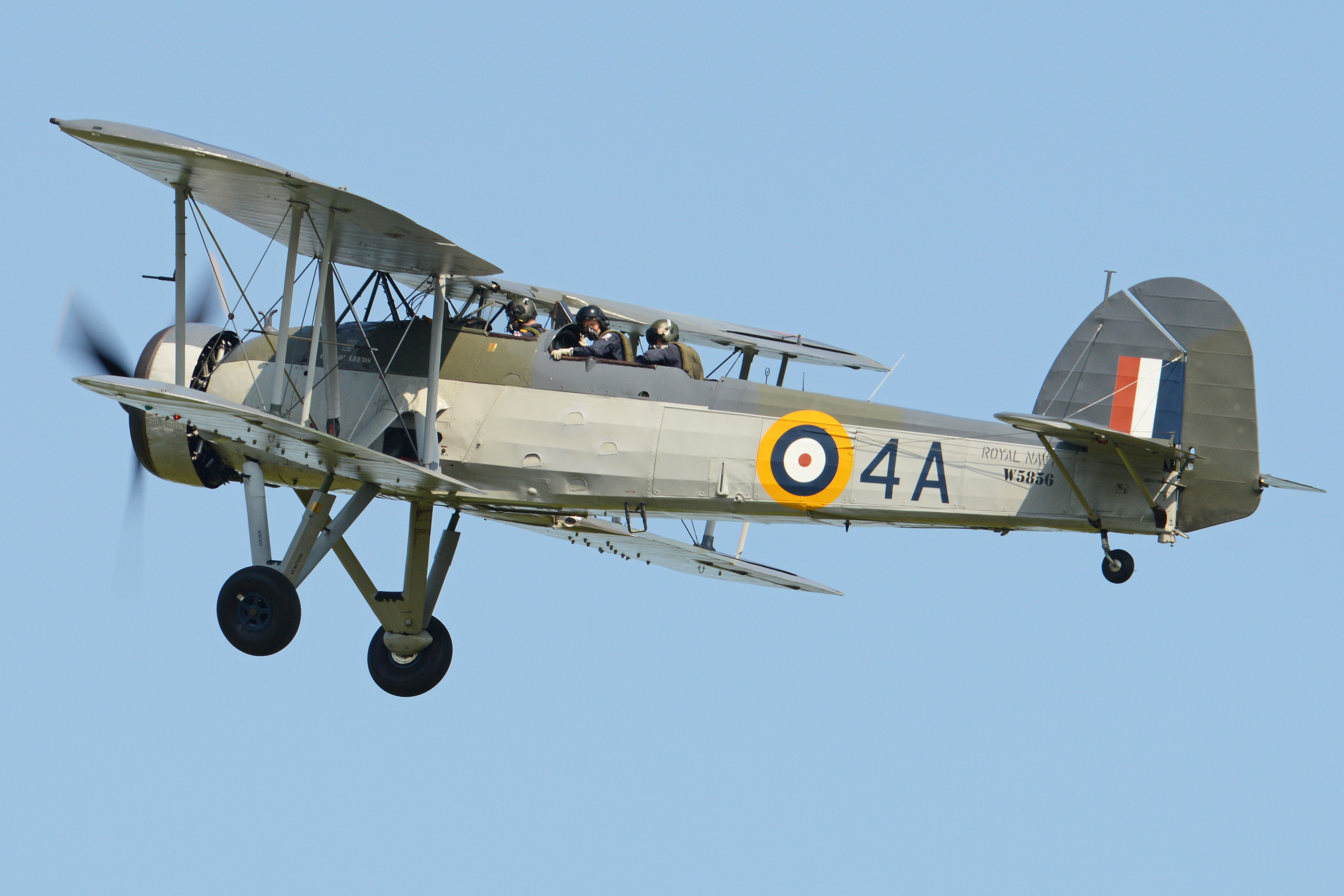
- Fairey Swordfish; an example of the type used by 835 Squadron
- Active: 1942–1945
- Disbanded: 1 April 1945
- Country: United Kingdom
- Branch: Royal Navy
- Type: Torpedo Bomber Reconnaissance squadron
- Role: Carrier-based: anti-submarine warfare (ASW); anti-surface warfare (ASuW); Maritime patrol; Combat air patrol (CAP)
- Part of: Fleet Air Arm
- Home station: See Naval air stations section for full list.
- Mottos: Semper miseri sumus (Latin for 'We are always miserable')
- Battle honours: Atlantic 1943–44; Arctic 1944–45

Commanders
- Notable commanders: Lieutenant Commander M. Johnstone, DSC, RN; Lieutenant Commander(A) J.R. Godley, RNVR

Insignia
- Squadron Badge Description: Wartime unofficial: the word JOE, to reflect the squadron's feeling that they were always given the dirty and unglamorous tasks
- Identification Markings: single letters (Swordfish); 5A+ (Swordfish April 1943); YA+ (Swordfish on Nairana early 1945); 7A+ (Sea Hurricane); YA+ (Wildcat on Nairana)

Aircraft flown
- Attack: Fairey Swordfish
- Fighter: Hawker Sea Hurricane; Grumman Wildcat

835 Naval Air Squadron (835 NAS), also referred to as 835 Squadron, is an inactive Fleet Air Arm (FAA) naval air squadron of the United Kingdom’s Royal Navy (RN). It was originally formed in February 1942 as a torpedo bomber and reconnaissance unit flying Fairey Swordfish. In June 1943, six Sea Hurricanes were added to the squadron as a fighter flight. The composite unit exchanged the Hurricanes in September 1944 for Grumman Wildcats, serving on until 1 April 1945, when the squadron disbanded.

== History ==
=== 1942 ===
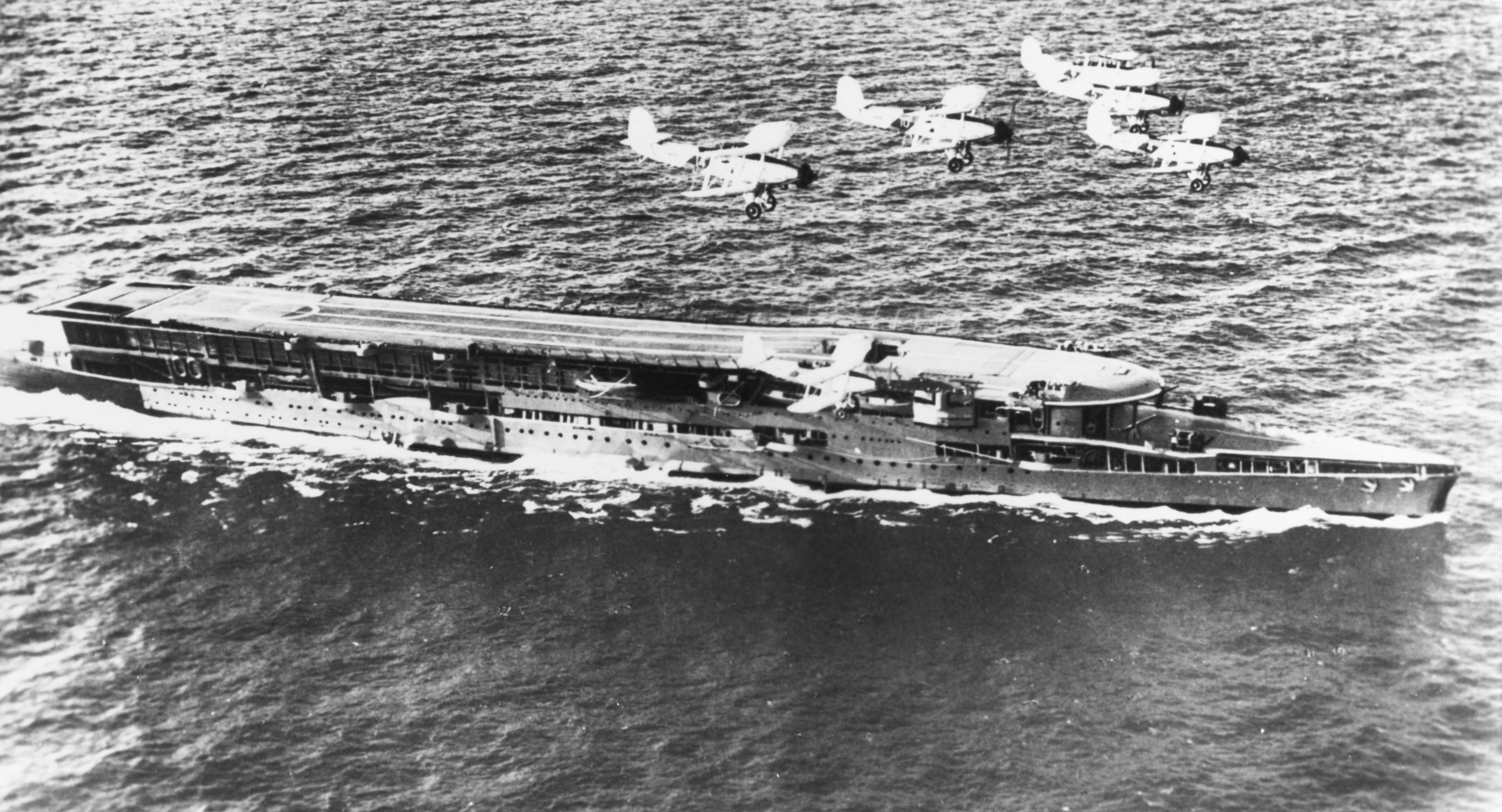
HMS Furious at sea, circa 1935–36, with a flight of Blackburn Baffin torpedo planes overhead.

The first members of the squadron assembled at the Royal Naval Air Station (RNAS) Eastleigh (also known as HMS Raven) in January 1942 near Southampton in Hampshire. They left Eastleigh on 29 January to board the SS Andalucia Star at Glasgow. The ship sailed from Glasgow on 4 February and arrived in Kingston, Jamaica on 17 February. 835 Naval Air Squadron officially formed that day at Palisadoes (HMS Buzzard), Jamaica as a torpedo-bomber and reconnaissance squadron of Fairey Swordfish. After patrolling the seas around Jamaica until 12 March 1942, the squadron moved to Norfolk, Virginia, where a refitted HMS Furious lay waiting to take them aboard. HMS Furious left Norfolk on 3 April 1942, and arrived at RNAS Lee-on-Solent (HMS Daedalus), Hampshire, on 15 April. The squadron moved to RNAS Hatston (HMS Sparrowhawk), Mainland, Orkney, Scotland, in June 1942. During a period of frequent relocation the squadron moved to RNAS Stretton (HMS Blackcap), Cheshire, on 22 September 1942 and to RNAS Machrihanish (HMS Landrail), Argyll, on 29 October to spend November doing initial Deck Launch Training (DLT) on the escort carrier HMS Activity. December saw temporary return to RNAS Machrihanish before relocation to RAF Kirkistown, County Down, Northern Ireland.

=== 1943 ===
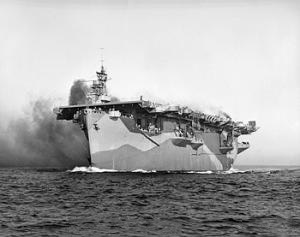
HMS Battler underway.

Return to RNAS Machrihanish on 29 January 1943 caused the base to be nicknamed "Clapham Junction" by the squadron. Carrier embarkation was aboard HMS Battler on 8 April 1943 for convoy duties, but the squadron returned to RNAS Machrihanish for RP-3 Rocket Projectile training on 7 May. After a short return to HMS Battler, the squadron moved to RAF Ballykelly, County Londonderry, Northern Ireland on 15 May and to RNAS Eglinton (HMS Gannet) on 22 May. In June 1943, 835 Squadron was reinforced with a flight of six Sea Hurricane Mk.IIcs from 804 squadron. The Hurricanes spent part of September and October 1943 operating from HMS Ravager, while some of the Swordfishes served aboard HMS Argus and the others remained at RAF Ayr, Ayrshire, Scotland. After a period ashore at RNAS Eglington, the squadron shortly embarked on HMS Chaser for three weeks before transfer to RNAS Abbotsinch (HMS Sanderling) and thence to RNAS Eglington.

=== 1944 ===
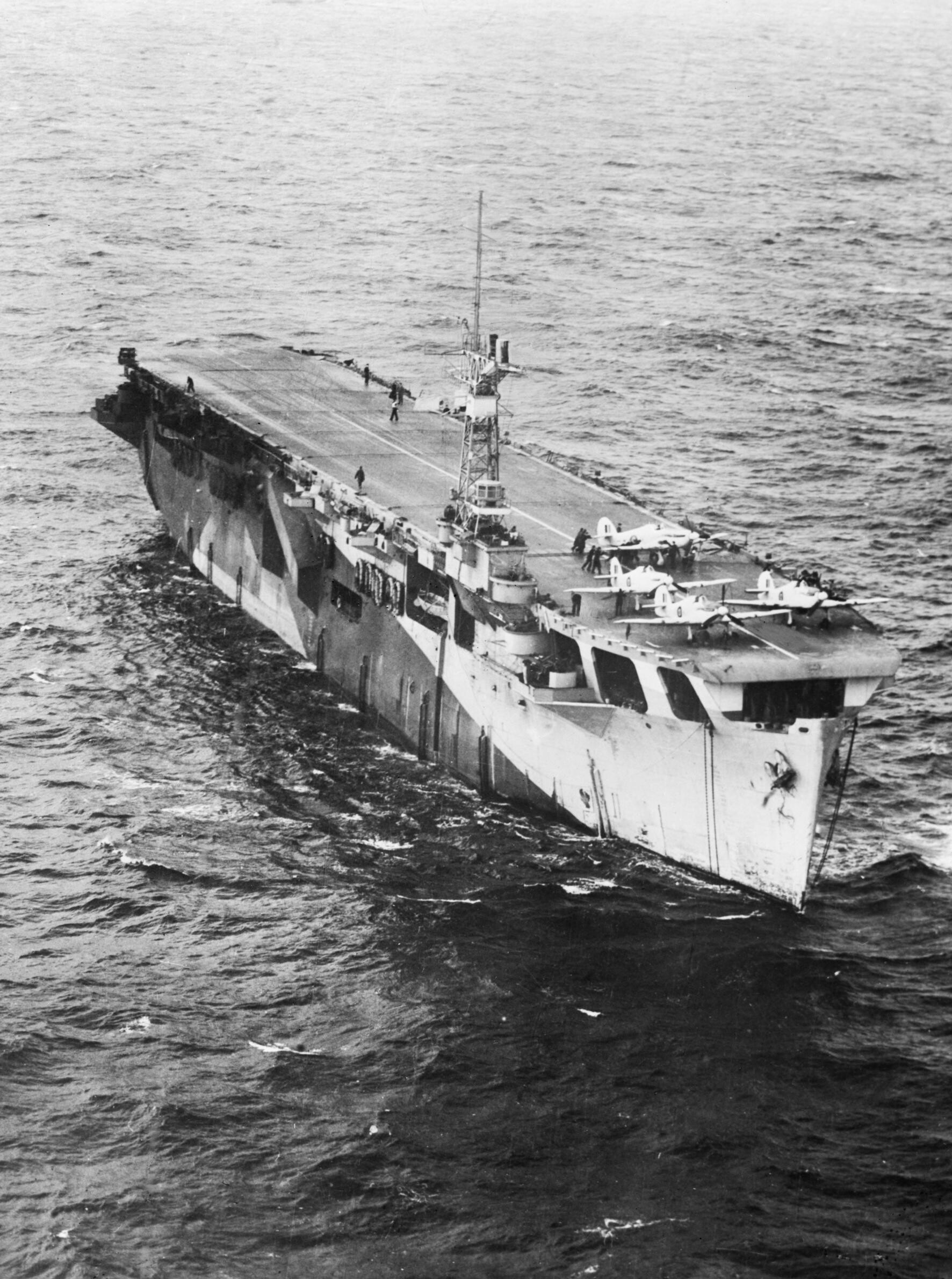
British escort carrier HMS Nairana underway.

The squadron transferred to the escort carrier HMS Nairana on 31 December 1943, and returned ashore at RNAS Hatston and RNAS Machrihanish in January 1944. Most of 1944, however, was spent onboard HMS Nairana, on Atlantic convoy duties and on the Gibraltar Run. The squadron also served in 1944 with a successful submarine Hunter-Killer Group in the North Atlantic under the overall command of Captain Frederick Walker. Three Ju 290s were shot down in May and June. The squadron became involved in the Murmansk Convoys to and from RNAS Hatston in August. Squadron pilots faced the most dangerous flying conditions of the war to attack two U-boats and shoot down four enemy aircraft in the Arctic. The aging Sea Hurricanes were replaced by Grumman Wildcat Mk.VIs in September.

=== 1945 ===
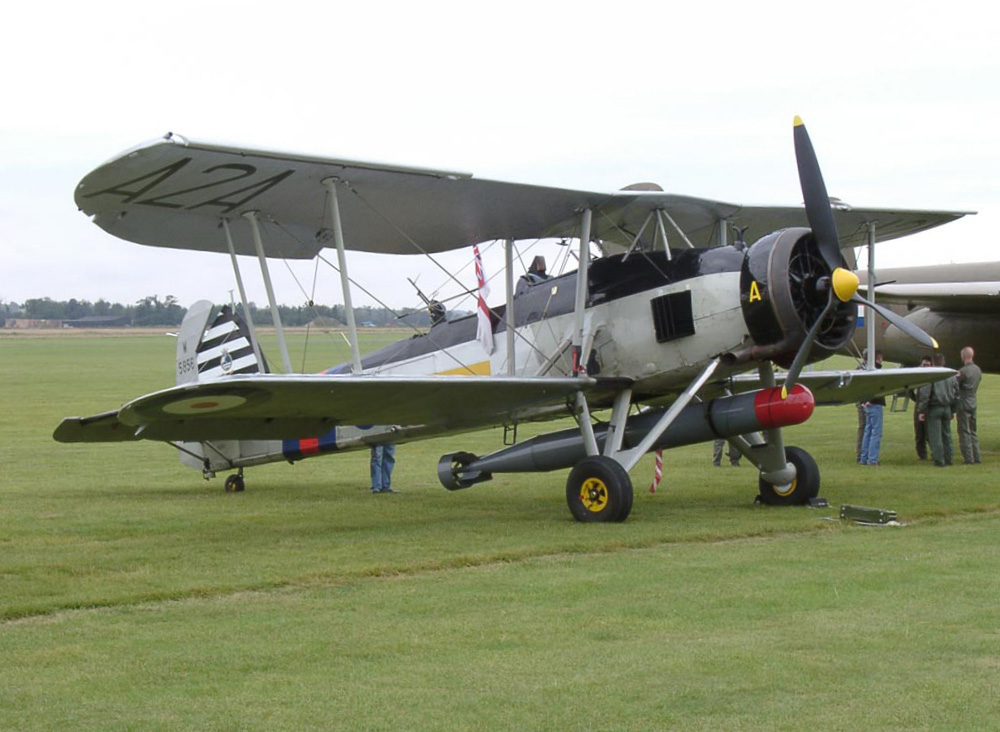
An example of a still-flying Fairey Swordfish.

The squadron of 14 Swordfish and six Grumman Wildcats was led by Lieutenant-Commander Val Jones, a Swordfish Observer. The Senior Pilot of the squadron was Lieutenant Allen Burgham, DSC, MiD, who flew Sea Hurricane Mk.IIcs and later Wildcat Mk.VIs, and was Flight Commander of the Fighter Component. Lt-Commander John Godley RNVR, who had previously been in command of 'P' Flight of 836 Naval Air Squadron, became commander of the squadron on 9 January 1945.

Lieutenant-Commander Godley served as Squadron Commanding Officer for one Murmansk Convoy in February 1945. 835 Squadron saw further combat doing two coastal anti-shipping raids along the Norwegian coast off Trondheim, before being disbanded on 1 April 1945 at RNAS Hatston, with its fighter flight transferring to 821 Naval Air Squadron. Lieutenant-Commander Godley was transferred to command 714 Naval Air Squadron.

== Aircraft operated ==
The squadron has operated a number of different aircraft types:

Aircraft operated by 835 Naval Air Squadron
Aircraft	Variant	Type	From	To
Fairey Swordfish	I	torpedo bomber	February 1942	February 1943
Fairey Swordfish	II	torpedo bomber	October 1942	June 1944
Hawker Sea Hurricane	Mk IIC	fighter aircraft	June 1943	September 1944
Fairey Swordfish	III	torpedo bomber	July 1944	March 1945
Grumman Wildcat	Mk.VI	fighter aircraft	September 1944	March 1945

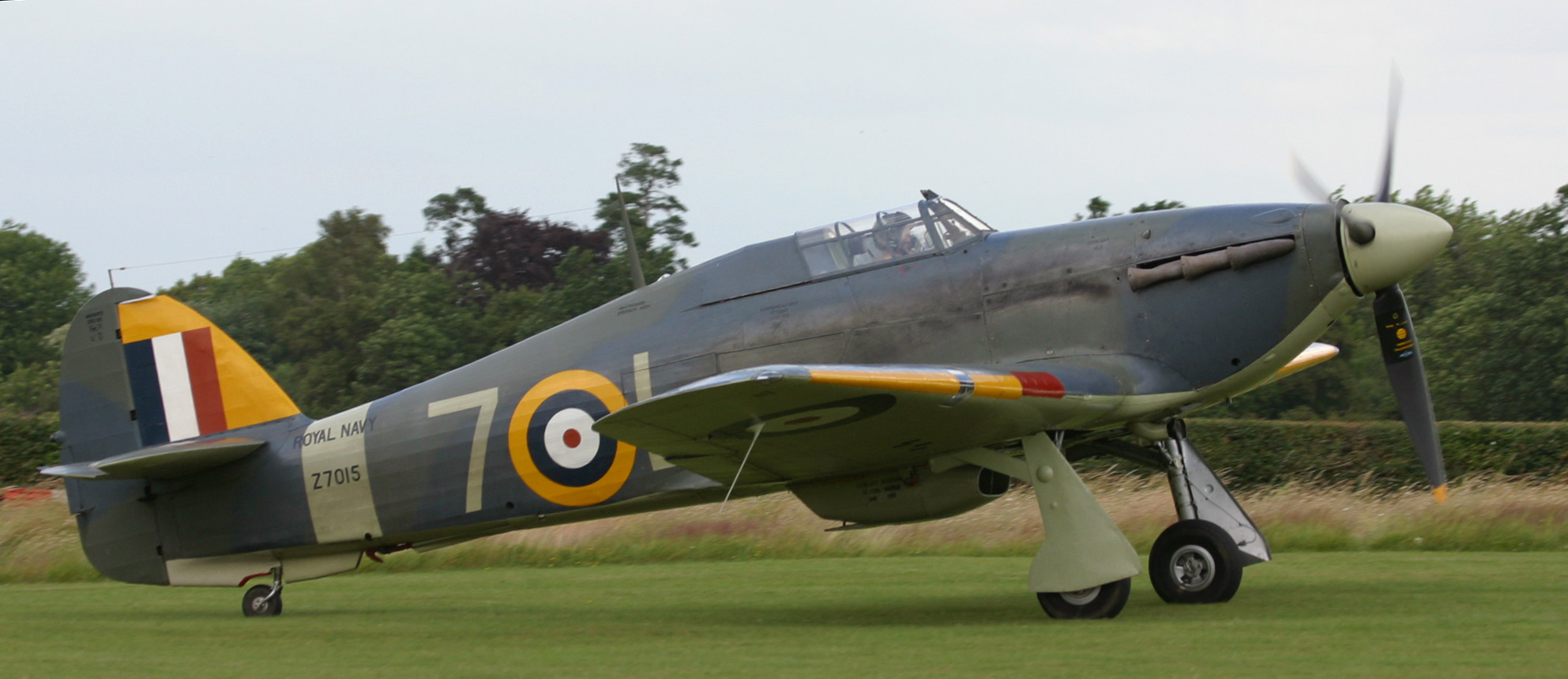
An example of a still flying Hawker Sea Hurricane of the type used by 835 Squadron

== Battle honours ==
The battle honours awarded to 835 Naval Air Squadron are:

- Atlantic 1943-44
- Arctic 1944-45

== Naval air stations and aircraft carriers ==
835 Naval Air Squadron was active at various naval air stations of the Royal Navy and Royal Air Force stations, both within the United Kingdom and internationally. Additionally, it operated from several Royal Navy escort carriers.

=== World War Two air stations and aircraft carriers ===
Air stations and aircraft carriers used by 835 Naval Air Squadron during World War two including dates:

From	To	Base	Remark
1 January 1942	29 January 1942	RNAS Eastleigh (HMS Raven), Hampshire	
29 January 1942	17 February 1942	En route to Jamaica	
17 February 1942	12 March 1942	Palisadoes (HMS Buzzard), Kingston, Jamaica	
12 March 1942	2 April 1942	En route to Norfolk, Virginia	
3 April 1942	15 April 1942	HMS Furious	
15 April 1942	June 1942	RNAS Lee-on-Solent (HMS Daedalus), Hampshire	
June 1942	21 September 1942	RNAS Hatston (HMS Sparrowhawk), Orkney, Scotland	
22 September 1942	28 October 1942	RNAS Stretton (HMS Blackcap), Cheshire	
29 October 1942	12 November 1942	RNAS Machrihanish (HMS Landrail), Argyll, Scotland	
13 November 1942	27 November 1942	HMS Activity	
28 November 1942	18 December 1942	RNAS Machrihanish (HMS Landrail), Argyll, Scotland	
18 December 1942	29 January 1943	RAF Kirkistown, County Down, Northern Ireland	
29 January 1943	8 April 1943	RNAS Machrihanish (HMS Landrail), Argyll, Scotland	
9 April 1943	7 May 1943	HMS Battler	
7 May 1943	14 May 1943	RNAS Machrihanish (HMS Landrail), Argyll, Scotland	
14 May 1943	15 May 1943	HMS Battler	
15 May 1943	22 May 1943	RAF Ballykelly, County Londonderry, Northern Ireland	
22 May 1943	4 June 1943	RNAS Eglington (HMS Gannet), County Londonderry, Northern Ireland	
4 June 1943	28 June 1943	HMS Battler	Detachment at RNAS Eglington, County Londonderry, Northern Ireland
28 June 1943	July 1943	RNAS Eglington (HMS Gannet), County Londonderry, Northern Ireland	
July 1943	30 July 1943	HMS Battler	
30 July 1943	6 November 1943	RAF Ayr, Ayrshire, Scotland	
9 September 1943	6 November 1943	HMS Ravager	Sea Hurricane flight
9 September 1943	6 November 1943	HMS Argus	part of Swordfish flight
6 November 1943	27 November 1943	HMS Chaser	
27 November 1943	16 December 1943	RNAS Abbotsinch (HMS Sanderling), Renfrewshire, Scotland	
16 December 1943	30 December 1943	RNAS Eglington (HMS Gannet), County Londonderry, Northern Ireland	
31 December 1943	January 1944	HMS Nairana	
January 1944	24 February 1944	RNAS Hatston (HMS Sparrowhawk) and RNAS Machrihanish (HMS Landrail)	
24 February 1944	6 March 1944	HMS Nairana	
6 March 1944	8 March 1944	RAF Gibraltar	
8 March 1944	15 March 1944	HMS Nairana	
15 March 1944	17 March 1944	RNAS Abbotsinch (HMS Sanderling), Renfrewshire, Scotland	
17 March	5 April 1944	HMS Nairana	
5 April 1944	10 April 1944	RAF Gibraltar	
10 April 1944	17 April 1944	HMS Nairana	
17 April 1944	13 May 1944	RNAS Abbotsinch (HMS Sanderling), Renfrewshire, Scotland	
13 May 1944	4 July 1944	HMS Nairana	
4 July 1944	13 August 1944	RNAS Burscough (HMS Ringtail), Lancashire	
13 August 1944	14 September 1944	HMS Nairana	
14 September 1944	14 October 1944	RNAS Yeovilton (HMS Heron), Somerset	
14 October 1944	29 October 1944	HMS Nairana	
29 October 1944	2 November 1944	Murmansk, Russia	
2 November 1944	9 November 1944	HMS Nairana	
9 November 1944	30 November 1944	RNAS Machrihanish (HMS Landrail), Argyll, Scotland	
30 November 1944	20 December 1944	HMS Nairana	
20 December 1944	27 December 1945	RAF Ayr, Ayrshire, Scotland	
27 December 1944	5 January 1945	HMS Nairana	
5 January 1945	22 January 1945	RNAS Machrihanish (HMS Landrail), Argyll, Scotland	
22 January 1945	29 January 1945	HMS Nairana	
29 January 1945	5 February 1945	RNAS Hatston (HMS Sparrowhawk), Orkney, Scotland	
5 February 1945	28 February 1945	HMS Nairana	
28 February 1945	26 March 1945	RNAS Hatston (HMS Sparrowhawk), Orkney, Scotland	
26 March 1945	29 March 1945	HMS Nairana	
29 March 1945	1 April 1945	RNAS Hatston (HMS Sparrowhawk), Orkney, Scotland	

== Commanding officers ==
List of commanding officers of 835 Naval Air Squadron:

Commanding Officers - 835 Naval Air Squadron
Name	From	To
Lieutenant Commander M. Johnstone, DSC, RN	17 February 1942	15 April 1942
Lieutenant Commander J.R. Lang, RN	15 April 1942	28 June 1943
Lieutenant Commander W.N. Waller, RN	28 June 1943	December 1943
Lieutenant Commander(A) T.T. Miller, RN	December 1943	9 February 1944
Lieutenant Commander E.E. Barringer, RNVR	9 February 1944	13 August 1944
Lieutenant Commander(A) F.V. Jones, RNVR	13 August 1944	9 January 1945
Lieutenant Commander(A) J.R. Godley, RNVR	9 January 1945	31 March 1945

Note: Abbreviation (A) signifies Air Branch of the RN or RNVR.

== See also ==
- List of Fleet Air Arm aircraft squadrons
