= HMS Chaser =

1943 Attacker-class escort carrier of the Royal Navy

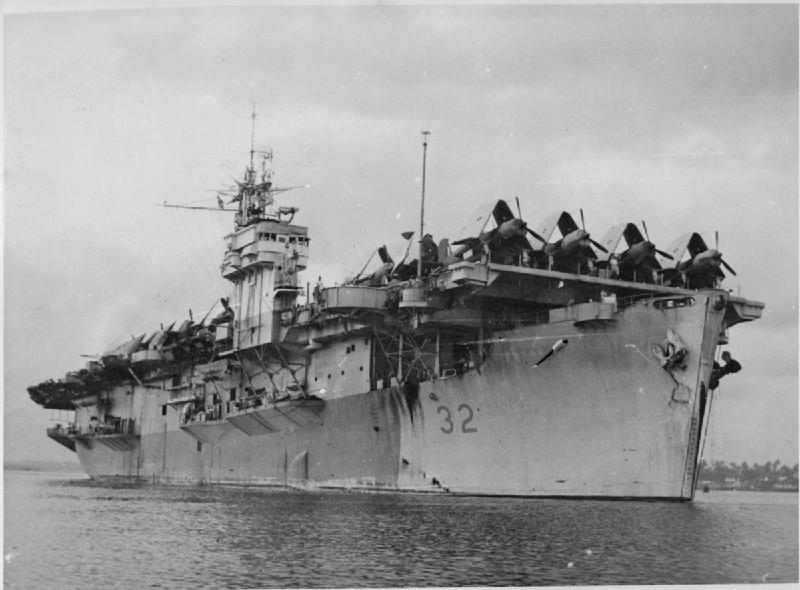
- HMS Chaser in 1945

History

United States
- Name: Mormacgulf; Mormacdove; Breton
- Namesake: Moore-McCormack Lines, Inc.; Breton Sound, Louisiana
- Operator: Moore-McCormack Lines, Inc. (intended)
- Ordered: as a C3-S-A1 hull MC-162
- Awarded: 9 September 1940
- Builder: Ingalls Shipbuilding, Pascagoula, Mississippi
- Cost: $7,412,192
- Yard number: 295
- Way number: 3
- Laid down: 28 June 1941
- Launched: 19 June 1942
- Acquired: 27 March 1943
- Renamed: Breton, 26 December 1941
- Reclassified: ACV, 20 Aug 1942; CVE, 15 July 1943
- Identification: Hull symbol: AVG-10; ACV-10; CVE-10
- Fate: Transferred to the Royal Navy, 9 April 1943

United Kingdom
- Name: Chaser
- Namesake: One that chases or purses another
- Acquired: 9 April 1943
- Commissioned: 9 April 1943
- Identification: Pennant number: D32; R306; A727
- Fate: Returned to USN, 12 May 1946

United States
- Name: CVE-10
- Acquired: 12 May 1946
- Stricken: 3 August 1946
- Fate: Sold for merchant use, 20 Dec 1946

General characteristics
- Class & type: Bogue-class escort carrier (USA); Attacker-class escort carrier (UK)
- Displacement: 8,390 long tons (8,520 t) (standard); 13,980 long tons (14,200 t) (full load)
- Length: 465 ft (142 m) (wl); 495 ft 8 in (151.08 m) (oa); 440 ft (130 m) (fd)
- Beam: 69 ft 6 in (21.18 m) wl; 82 ft (25 m) (fd); 111 ft 6 in (33.99 m) (extreme width)
- Draught: 23 ft 3 in (7.09 m) (mean); 26 ft (7.9 m) (max)
- Installed power: 2 × Foster-Wheeler 285 psi (1,970 kPa) boilers; 8,500 shp (6,300 kW)
- Propulsion: 1 × Allis-Chalmers steam turbine; 1 × Screw
- Speed: 18 kn (33 km/h; 21 mph)
- Complement: 646
- Armament: 2 × 4 in (102 mm)/50 caliber MK 9 guns; 4 × twin 40 mm (1.57 in) Bofors anti-aircraft guns (AA) (4×2); 8 × twin 20 mm (0.79 in) Oerlikon AA cannons; 10 × single 20 mm Oerlikon AA cannons
- Aircraft carried: 24
- Aviation facilities: 1 × hydraulic catapult; 2 × elevators

Service record
- Operations: Battle of the Atlantic, Arctic convoys (1943–45)
- Victories: Sank U-472, U-366, U-973 (1944)

HMS Chaser (D32/R306/A727) was an American-built Attacker-class escort carrier that served with the Royal Navy during the Second World War.

Acquired by the United States Navy for conversion to a Bogue-class escort carrier; she was transferred to the Royal Navy and commissioned as Chaser on 9 April 1943, under the Lend-Lease agreement. She spent most of her career escorting convoys in Arctic, then transferred to the British Pacific Fleet in March 1945.

== Construction ==
Chaser was laid down on 28 June 1941, under a Maritime Commission contract, by Ingalls Shipbuilding of Pascagoula, Mississippi, as MC Hull No. 162 (Ingalls Hull No. 262) as, a Type C3-S2-A1 freighter that was earmarked for service,numder the name Mormacgulf, with Moore-McCormick Lines. Her tentative name was changed to Mormacdove on 5 December 1941. On 26 December she was acquired by the U.S. Navy for completion as a Bogue-class Aircraft Escort Vessel, AVG-10, to be named USS Breton. Sponsored by Mrs. Eugene T. Oates, she was launched on 19 June 1942. On 20 August 1942, she was reclassified as an Auxiliary Aircraft Carrier, ACV-10.

On 9 April, having completed her builder's trials, the ship was formally delivered to the U.S. Navy; it is not clear whether she was ever commisssioned into the USN, butbon the same day she was transferred to Britain under Lend-Lease and commissioned into the Royal Navy as HMS Chaser. As Lend-Lease vessels were still officially "kept on the books" by the U.S. government, on 15 June 1943 she, along with all other ACVs, was reclassified as an Escort Aircraft Carrier, becoming CVE-10.

== Design and description ==
Eleven Attacker-class carriers served with the Royal Navy during the Second World War. They were built between 1941 and 1942, by Seattle-Tacoma Shipbuilding Corporation, Ingalls Shipbuilding, and Western Pipe & Steel in the United States. They were originally intended to serve alongside small surface vessels (destroyers, sloops, frigates, and corvettes), their aircraft flying anti-submarine patrols from dawn to dusk. using both radar and visual observation in to search for U-boats. Normally patrols would last two to three hours, with one plane scouting out about 10 mi (16 km) ahead of the convoy, while another patrolled astern. When a submarine was located a plane could attack with torpedoes, depth charges, 250 lb (110 kg) bombs or RP-3 rocket projectiles. These aircraft would also pinpoint the positions of submarines so that the surface escorts could join the attack. The carriers also served a secondary role, supplying oil and provisions to her accompanying destroyers. This could be a lengthy process and was done on the move. It took 40 minutes from firing a line across to the destroyer to start pumping oil, while it took another two hours to pump 98 tons of oil and a further 35 minutes to disconnect the hose pipe and secure the equipment.

Chaser had an overall length of 495 ft 8 in (151.08 m), a beam of 69 ft 6 in (21.18 m) and a draught of 24 ft 8 in (7.52 m). She displaced 14,170 long tons (14,400 t) at full load. Power was provided by two boilers feeding steam to a turbine driving one shaft, giving 8,500 shp (6,300 kW), which could propel the ship at 18 kn (33 km/h; 21 mph).

Aircraft facilities included a small (25 by 6 foot/7.6 by 1.8 m) combined bridge–flight control island, placed far forward on the starboard side, outside the footprint of the hull and flight deck and braced from beneath with struts. The flight deck measured 450 ft × 120 ft (137 m × 37 m), and incorporated nine arrestor wires and three crash barriers. Underneath lay a 260 ft × 62 ft (79 m × 19 m) hangar, with a 42 by 34 foot (12.8 by 10.4 m) aircraft lift at each end. She had the ability to operate up to 24 aircraft, with the squadrons embarked depending upon the mission: for convoy defence missions composite squadrons, equipped with both anti-submarine and fighter aircraft, were carried, while for missions as a strike carrier squadrons equipped exclusively with fighter aircraft were employed instead. Aircraft operated during her career included British-made Hawker Sea Hurricane and Supermarine Seafire, and American-built Grumman Martlet (General Motors FM-1) fighters, and Fairey Swordfish torpedo bombers, the latter used in an anti-submarine role. When employed as an aircraft transport Chaser could carry 90 aircraft.

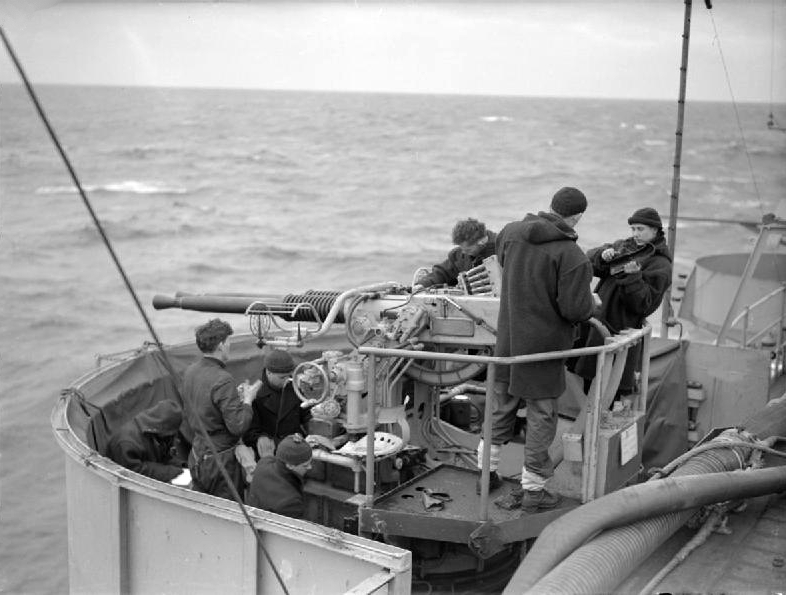
A typical twin 40 mm Bofors anti-aircraft gun mounting on the Attacker-class.

The ship's armament was optimized for anti-aircraft (AA) defence and consisted of eight 40 mm (1.57 in) Bofors guns in twin mounts and ten 20 mm (0.79 in) Oerlikon cannons in single and eight in twin mounts. She also carried two 4 inch (102 mm)/50 caliber Mk 9 guns.

The ship had complement of 646 men, who lived in crew accommodation that was significantly different from the arrangements that were normal for the Royal Navy at the time. The separate messes no longer had to prepare their own food, as everything was cooked in the galley and served cafeteria style in a central dining area. They were also equipped with a modern laundry and a barber shop. The traditional hammocks were replaced by three-tier bunk-beds, 18 to a cabin, which were hinged and could be tied up to provide extra space when not in use.

== Service history ==
After workup in the Chesapeake Bay area, Chaser embarked 845 Squadron, which had been formed in the US, on 23 June 1943, for passage across the Atlantic. She crossed the Atlantic in company with Convoy HX 245, arriving at the Clyde on 6 July 1943.

On 7 July 1943, there was an explosion in Chaser's boiler room. She was repaired at Rosyth Dockyard. On 29 October, with her repairs completed, she returned to the Clyde, where she was allocated to the Western Approaches Command. She embarked 835 Squadron equipped with Fairey Swordfish and Sea Hurricanes for workup. On 29 November, Chaser returned to the Clyde for further defect rectification. These repairs would continue for the remainder of the year. Upon the return to active duty she was attached to the Home Fleet for convoy duty on the Russian convoy route, embarking 816 Squadrons, equipped with Swordfish and Grumman Wildcats, and sailed for Scapa Flow.

=== Arctic duty ===
On 22 January 1944, Chaser joined Convoy JW 57, which had left Loch Ewe the previous day, for escort to the Kola Inlet. She was the first escort carrier assigned to provide protection for large convoys as they steamed to Russia. Chaser's Wildcats helped to drive off German aircraft shadowing the convoy, while her Swordfish made several unsuccessful attacks against German submarines. On 24 February, one of Chaser' Swordfishes spotted the submarine U-713 on the surface and called up the destroyer Keppel which sank the U-boat with depth charges. A second submarine U-601 was sunk by a shore based flying boat, while one escorting destroyer, Mahratta was sunk by a U-boat. None of the 43 merchant ships comprising the convoy was hit by the 14 U-boats deployed in two patrol lines against the convoy.

Chaser joined the return convoy, RA 57 of 33 merchant ships, on 2 March. On 4 March, one of Chaser's Swordfish caught U-472 on the surface. U-472 was unable to defend itself as its anti-aircraft guns were iced up, and the Swordfish attacked with bombs and rockets, damaging the submarine, and then called up the destroyer Onslaught which finished off the submarine with gunfire. The next day, a Swordfish from Chaser attacked and sunk U-366 with rockets, at 72°10′N 14°44′E in the Arctic, northwest of Hammerfest, Norway. On 6 March, radio signals from a submarine were detected by HF/DF and a Swordfish was sent to investigate. The Swordfish spotted the submarine and attacked with rockets, sinking U973 at 70°04′N 5°48′E in the Norwegian Sea, northwest of Narvik, Norway. One merchant ship was sunk.

After returning to Loch Ewe on 10 March, Chaser dragged her anchor and ran aground on 13 March, being towed off the next day. She had her hull repaired and was refitted at Rosyth and was then modified for service as a ferry carrier with the Pacific Fleet at Belfast.

=== Pacific duty ===
On 14 February 1945, Chaser left Britain on the first part of the journey to join the British Pacific Fleet, arriving in Sydney in May 1945, where she was attached to the 30th Aircraft Carrier Squadron. She was designated as a replenishment carrier, tasked with ferrying replacement aircraft to the forward areas where they could be transferred to the operational carriers. Chaser ferried aircraft to support British Pacific fleet operations during the invasion of Okinawa and operations off Japan in July–August 1945. Owing to a shortage to dedicated tankers, Chaser was also used to refuel other ships.

Following the Japanese surrender in August 1945, she transported Allied prisoners of war homeward.

== Decommissioning ==
The escort carrier was returned to the United States Navy at Norfolk, Virginia on 12 May 1946, and the ship was struck from the US Navy list on 3 August 1946. She was sold to the Waterman Steamship Co. on 20 December 1946 and later resold to the Netherlands.

== Merchant service ==
She was renamed Aagtekerk in civilian service and was later renamed E Yung. The ship foundered on 4 December 1972, and was salvaged and then scrapped in Taiwan.

== FAA squadrons ==
Fleet Air Arm Squadrons stationed on Chaser
Squadron	Dates	Aircraft type
835	November 1943 – December 1943	Fairey Swordfish Mks.II/Hawker Sea Hurricane
816	April 1943 - September 1943	Fairey Swordfish Mks.II/Grumman Wildcat Mk.V
899	August 1943 - October 1943	Supermarine Seafire L.III

== Bibliography ==
- Blair, Clay (2000). Hitler's U-Boat War: The Hunted 1942–1945. New York: Modern Library. ISBN 0-679-64033-9.
- "Breton". DANFS. Navy Department, Naval History and Heritage Command. This article incorporates text from this source, which is in the public domain.
- Cocker, Maurice (2008). Aircraft-Carrying Ships of the Royal Navy. Stroud, Gloucestershire: The History Press. ISBN 978-0-7524-4633-2.
- Helgason, Guðmundur. "HMS Chaser (D 32)". German U-boats of WWII - uboat.net.
- Hobbs, David (1996). Aircraft Carriers of the Royal and Commonwealth Navies. London: Greenhill Books. ISBN 1-85367-252-1.
- Hobbs, David (2013). British Aircraft Carriers: Design, Development and Service Histories. Barnsley, UK: Seaforth Publishing. ISBN 978-1-84832-138-0.
- Hobbs, David (2017). The British Pacific Fleet: The Royal Navy's Most Powerful Strike Force. Barnsley, UK: Seaforth Publishing. ISBN 978-1-5267-0238-8.
- Kemp, Paul (1997). U-Boats Destroyed: German Submarine Losses in the World Wars. London: Arms & Armour Press. ISBN 1-85409-321-5.
- Morison, Samuel (2002). History of United States Naval Operations in World War II. Urbana, Illinois: University of Illinois Press. ISBN 978-0-252-07062-4.
- Poolman, Kenneth (1972). Escort Carrier 1941–1945. London: Ian Allan. ISBN 0-7110-0273-8.
- "Mormacgulf". United States Maritime Commission.
- Roskill, S. W. (1960). The War at Sea 1939–1945: Volume III: The Offensive Part I: 1st June 1943 – 31st May 1944. London: Her Majesty's Stationery Office.
- Ruegg, Bob; Hague, Arnold (1993). Convoys to Russia 1941–1945. Kendal, UK: World Ship Society. ISBN 0-905617-66-5.
- Sturtivant, Ray; Ballance, Theo (1994). The Squadrons of the Fleet Air Arm. Tonbridge, Kent, UK: Air Britain (Historians) Ltd. ISBN 0-85130-223-8.
