= German submarine U-472 =

German world war II submarine

History

Nazi Germany
- Name: U-472
- Ordered: 20 January 1941
- Builder: Deutsche Werke, Kiel
- Yard number: 303
- Laid down: 15 November 1941
- Launched: 6 March 1943
- Commissioned: 26 May 1943
- Fate: Sunk on 4 March 1944

General characteristics
- Class & type: Type VIIC submarine
- Displacement: 769 tonnes (757 long tons) surfaced; 871 t (857 long tons) submerged
- Length: 67.10 m (220 ft 2 in) o/a; 50.50 m (165 ft 8 in) pressure hull
- Beam: 6.20 m (20 ft 4 in) o/a; 4.70 m (15 ft 5 in) pressure hull
- Height: 9.60 m (31 ft 6 in)
- Draught: 4.74 m (15 ft 7 in)
- Installed power: 2,800–3,200 PS (2,100–2,400 kW; 2,800–3,200 bhp) (diesels); 750 PS (550 kW; 740 shp) (electric)
- Propulsion: 2 shafts; 2 × diesel engines; 2 × electric motors.
- Speed: 17.7 knots (32.8 km/h; 20.4 mph) surfaced; 7.6 knots (14.1 km/h; 8.7 mph) submerged
- Range: 8,500 nmi (15,700 km; 9,800 mi) at 10 knots (19 km/h; 12 mph) surfaced; 80 nmi (150 km; 92 mi) at 4 knots (7.4 km/h; 4.6 mph) submerged
- Test depth: 230 m (750 ft); Crush depth: 250–295 m (820–968 ft)
- Complement: 4 officers, 40–56 enlisted
- Armament: 5 × 53.3 cm (21 in) torpedo tubes (four bow, one stern); 14 × torpedoes or 26 TMA mines; 1 × 8.8 cm (3.46 in) deck gun (220 rounds); 1 × twin 2 cm (0.79 in) C/30 anti-aircraft gun

Service record
- Part of: 5th U-boat Flotilla; 26 May – 31 December 1943; 11th U-boat Flotilla; 1 January – 4 March 1944
- Identification codes: M 52 015
- Commanders: Oblt.z.S. Wolfgang-Friedrich Freiherr von Forstner; 26 May 1943 – 4 March 1944
- Operations: 1 patrol: 24 February – 4 March 1944
- Victories: None

German submarine U-472 was a Type VIIC U-boat of Nazi Germany's Kriegsmarine during World War II.

She carried out one patrol. She sank no ships.

She was sunk by a British aircraft Swordfish "B" of 816 Squadron FAA by rocket projectiles, and a British warship, southeast of Bear Island on 4 March 1944.

== Design ==
German Type VIIC submarines were preceded by the shorter Type VIIB submarines. U-472 had a displacement of 769 tonnes (757 long tons) when at the surface and 871 tonnes (857 long tons) while submerged. She had a total length of 67.10 m (220 ft 2 in), a pressure hull length of 50.50 m (165 ft 8 in), a beam of 6.20 m (20 ft 4 in), a height of 9.60 m (31 ft 6 in), and a draught of 4.74 m (15 ft 7 in). The submarine was powered by two Germaniawerft F46 four-stroke, six-cylinder supercharged diesel engines producing a total of 2,800 to 3,200 metric horsepower (2,060 to 2,350 kW; 2,760 to 3,160 shp) for use while surfaced, two Siemens-Schuckert GU 343/38–8 double-acting electric motors producing a total of 750 metric horsepower (550 kW; 740 shp) for use while submerged. She had two shafts and two 1.23 m (4 ft) propellers. The boat was capable of operating at depths of up to 230 metres (750 ft).

The submarine had a maximum surface speed of 17.7 knots (32.8 km/h; 20.4 mph) and a maximum submerged speed of 7.6 knots (14.1 km/h; 8.7 mph). When submerged, the boat could operate for 80 nautical miles (150 km; 92 mi) at 4 knots (7.4 km/h; 4.6 mph); when surfaced, she could travel 8,500 nautical miles (15,700 km; 9,800 mi) at 10 knots (19 km/h; 12 mph). U-472 was fitted with five 53.3 cm (21 in) torpedo tubes (four fitted at the bow and one at the stern), fourteen torpedoes, one 8.8 cm (3.46 in) SK C/35 naval gun, 220 rounds, and one twin 2 cm (0.79 in) C/30 anti-aircraft gun. The boat had a complement of between forty-four and sixty.

== Service history ==
The submarine was laid down on 15 November 1941 at the Deutsche Werke in Kiel as yard number 303, launched on 6 March 1943 and commissioned on 26 May under the command of Oberleutnant zur See Wolfgang-Friedrich Freiherr von Forstner.

She served with the 5th U-boat Flotilla from 26 May 1943 for training and the 11th flotilla from 1 January 1944 for operations.

=== Patrol and loss ===
U-472's only patrol was preceded by short voyages from Kiel in Germany to Hammerfest then Narvik in Norway. Her only sortie began with her departure from Narvik on 24 February 1944. She sailed out into the Norwegian Sea, then northeast towards the Barents Sea. On 4 March, when southeast of Bear Island, she was attacked and sunk (one source says she might have been scuttled) by gunfire and rockets from a Fairey Swordfish of 816 Naval Air Squadron FAA and the destroyer HMS Onslaught. The aircraft had come from HMS Chaser.

Twenty-three men died with U-472; there were thirty survivors.

=== Wolfpacks ===
U-472 took part in four wolfpacks, namely:

- Isegrim (25 – 27 January 1944)
- Werwolf (27 January – 1 February 1944)
- Hartmut (24 – 28 February 1944)
- Boreas (28 February – 4 March 1944)

== Bibliography ==
- Busch, Rainer; Röll, Hans-Joachim (1999). German U-boat commanders of World War II : a biographical dictionary. Translated by Brooks, Geoffrey. London, Annapolis, Md: Greenhill Books, Naval Institute Press. ISBN 1-55750-186-6.
- Busch, Rainer; Röll, Hans-Joachim (1999). Deutsche U-Boot-Verluste von September 1939 bis Mai 1945 [German U-boat losses from September 1939 to May 1945]. Der U-Boot-Krieg (in German). Vol. IV. Hamburg, Berlin, Bonn: Mittler. ISBN 3-8132-0514-2.
- Gröner, Erich; Jung, Dieter; Maass, Martin (1991). U-boats and Mine Warfare Vessels. German Warships 1815–1945. Vol. 2. Translated by Thomas, Keith; Magowan, Rachel. London: Conway Maritime Press. ISBN 0-85177-593-4.
- Kemp, Paul (1999). U-Boats Destroyed – German Submarine Losses in the World Wars. London: Arms & Armour. ISBN 1-85409-515-3.
