= German submarine U-366 =

German World War II submarine

History

Nazi Germany
- Name: U-366
- Ordered: 20 January 1941
- Builder: Flensburger Schiffbau-Gesellschaft, Flensburg
- Yard number: 485
- Laid down: 22 May 1942
- Launched: 16 April 1943
- Commissioned: 16 July 1943
- Fate: Sunk on 5 March 1944

General characteristics
- Class & type: Type VIIC submarine
- Displacement: 769 tonnes (757 long tons) surfaced; 871 t (857 long tons) submerged
- Length: 67.10 m (220 ft 2 in) o/a; 50.50 m (165 ft 8 in) pressure hull
- Beam: 6.20 m (20 ft 4 in) o/a; 4.70 m (15 ft 5 in) pressure hull
- Height: 9.60 m (31 ft 6 in)
- Draught: 4.74 m (15 ft 7 in)
- Installed power: 2,800–3,200 PS (2,100–2,400 kW; 2,800–3,200 bhp) (diesels); 750 PS (550 kW; 740 shp) (electric)
- Propulsion: 2 shafts; 2 × diesel engines; 2 × electric motors
- Speed: 17.7 knots (32.8 km/h; 20.4 mph) surfaced; 7.6 knots (14.1 km/h; 8.7 mph) submerged
- Range: 8,500 nmi (15,700 km; 9,800 mi) at 10 knots (19 km/h; 12 mph) surfaced; 80 nmi (150 km; 92 mi) at 4 knots (7.4 km/h; 4.6 mph) submerged
- Test depth: 230 m (750 ft); Crush depth: 250–295 m (820–968 ft)
- Complement: 4 officers, 40–56 enlisted
- Armament: 5 × 53.3 cm (21 in) torpedo tubes (four bow, one stern); 14 × torpedoes; 1 × 8.8 cm (3.46 in) deck gun (220 rounds); 2 × twin 2 cm (0.79 in) C/30 anti-aircraft guns

Service record
- Part of: 5th U-boat Flotilla; 16 July 1943 – 29 February 1944; 13th U-boat Flotilla; 1 – 5 March 1944
- Identification codes: M 53 317
- Commanders: Oblt.z.S. Bruno Langenberg; 16 July 1943 – 5 March 1944
- Operations: 2 patrols: 1st patrol: 20 – 29 February 1944; 2nd patrol: 4 – 5 March 1944
- Victories: None

German submarine U-366 was a Type VIIC U-boat of Nazi Germany's Kriegsmarine during World War II.

She carried out two patrols. She did not sink or damage any ships.

She was a member of three wolfpacks.

She was sunk by a British aircraft, Swordfish "F" of 816 Squadron FAA, northwest of Hammerfest on 5 March 1944.

== Design ==
German Type VIIC submarines were preceded by the shorter Type VIIB submarines. U-366 had a displacement of 769 tonnes (757 long tons) when at the surface and 871 tonnes (857 long tons) while submerged. She had a total length of 67.10 m (220 ft 2 in), a pressure hull length of 50.50 m (165 ft 8 in), a beam of 6.20 m (20 ft 4 in), a height of 9.60 m (31 ft 6 in), and a draught of 4.74 m (15 ft 7 in). The submarine was powered by two Germaniawerft F46 four-stroke, six-cylinder supercharged diesel engines producing a total of 2,800 to 3,200 metric horsepower (2,060 to 2,350 kW; 2,760 to 3,160 shp) for use while surfaced, two AEG GU 460/8–27 double-acting electric motors producing a total of 750 metric horsepower (550 kW; 740 shp) for use while submerged. She had two shafts and two 1.23 m (4 ft) propellers. The boat was capable of operating at depths of up to 230 metres (750 ft).

The submarine had a maximum surface speed of 17.7 knots (32.8 km/h; 20.4 mph) and a maximum submerged speed of 7.6 knots (14.1 km/h; 8.7 mph). When submerged, the boat could operate for 80 nautical miles (150 km; 92 mi) at 4 knots (7.4 km/h; 4.6 mph); when surfaced, she could travel 8,500 nautical miles (15,700 km; 9,800 mi) at 10 knots (19 km/h; 12 mph). U-366 was fitted with five 53.3 cm (21 in) torpedo tubes (four fitted at the bow and one at the stern), fourteen torpedoes, one 8.8 cm (3.46 in) SK C/35 naval gun, 220 rounds, and two twin 2 cm (0.79 in) C/30 anti-aircraft guns. The boat had a complement of between forty-four and sixty.

== Service history ==
The submarine was laid down on 22 May 1942 at the Flensburger Schiffbau-Gesellschaft yard at Flensburg as yard number 485, launched on 16 April 1943 and commissioned on 16 July under the command of Oberleutnant zur See Bruno Langenberg.

She served with the 5th U-boat Flotilla from 16 July 1943 and the 13th flotilla from 1 March 1944.

The boat was moved from Kiel in Germany to Bergen in Norway in February 1944.

=== First patrol ===
U-359's first patrol took her from Bergen to Hammerfest, along the Norwegian coastline, also in February.

=== Second patrol and loss ===
During another move from Hammerfest, she was attacked and sunk on 5 March 1944 by rockets fired from a Fairey Swordfish of 816 Naval Air Squadron, FAA (Fleet Air Arm). The aircraft had flown from the escort carrier HMS Chaser.

50 men died in the U-boat; there were no survivors.

=== Wolfpacks ===
U-366 took part in three wolfpacks, namely:

- Hartmut (23 – 28 February 1944)
- Boreas (4 – 5 March 1944)
- Orkan (5 March 1944)

== Bibliography ==
- Busch, Rainer; Röll, Hans-Joachim (1999). German U-boat commanders of World War II : a biographical dictionary. Translated by Brooks, Geoffrey. London, Annapolis, Md: Greenhill Books, Naval Institute Press. ISBN 1-55750-186-6.
- Busch, Rainer; Röll, Hans-Joachim (1999). Deutsche U-Boot-Verluste von September 1939 bis Mai 1945 [German U-boat losses from September 1939 to May 1945]. Der U-Boot-Krieg (in German). Vol. IV. Hamburg, Berlin, Bonn: Mittler. ISBN 3-8132-0514-2.
- Gröner, Erich; Jung, Dieter; Maass, Martin (1991). U-boats and Mine Warfare Vessels. German Warships 1815–1945. Vol. 2. Translated by Thomas, Keith; Magowan, Rachel. London: Conway Maritime Press. ISBN 0-85177-593-4.
- Kemp, Paul (1999). U-Boats Destroyed – German Submarine Losses in the World Wars. London: Arms & Armour. ISBN 1-85409-515-3.
