= HMS Buzzard =

Four ships and two shore establishments of the Royal Navy have been named HMS Buzzard after the bird, the buzzard:

== Ships ==
- HMS Buzzard was a 16-gun brig-sloop, originally the French ship Lutine. She was captured in the Leeward Islands in 1806 and commissioned as HMS Hawk. She was renamed HMS Buzzard in 1813 and was sold in 1814.
- HMS Buzzard (1834) was a 10-gun brigantine, originally ordered as a Cherokee-class brig-sloop. She was launched in 1834 and sold in 1843.
- HMS Buzzard (1849) was a wooden paddle sloop launched in 1849 and broken up in 1883.
- HMS Buzzard (1887) was a Nymphe-class composite screw sloop launched in 1887, renamed HMS President in 1911 and sold in 1921.

== Shore establishments ==
- HMS Buzzard (UK shore base) was a Royal Naval Air Station at Lympne, Kent commissioned in 1939 and paid off later that year. It was recommissioned in 1940, renamed HMS Daedalus II later that year, and was then handed over to the Royal Air Force.
- HMS Buzzard (Jamaica shore base) was a Royal Naval Air Station at Kingston, Jamaica, in service between 1940 and 1945.
