= HMS Ravager (D70) =

WWII Attacker-class escort carrier

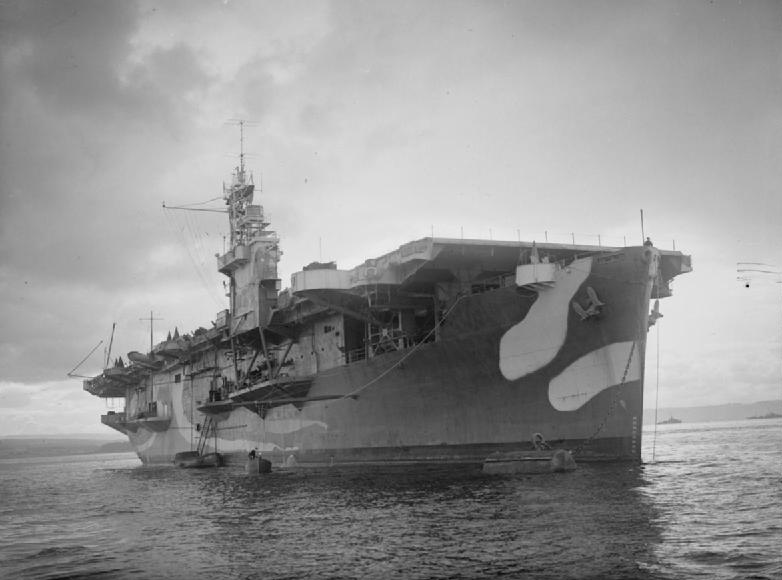
- HMS Ravager (D70)

History

United States
- Name: Charger; Ravager
- Namesake: One that attacks; One who plunders
- Ordered: as a Type C3-S-A1 hull, MCE hull 240
- Builder: Seattle-Tacoma Shipbuilding Corporation, Tacoma, Washington
- Laid down: 11 April 1942
- Launched: 16 July 1942
- Acquired: 25 April 1943
- Renamed: Ravager, 16 July 1942
- Reclassified: ACV, 20 Aug 1942; CVE, 15 July 1943
- Identification: Hull symbol: AVG-24; ACV-24; CVE-24
- Fate: Transferred to the Royal Navy, 25 April 1943

United Kingdom
- Name: Ravager
- Acquired: 25 April 1943
- Commissioned: 25 April 1943
- Decommissioned: 27 February 1946
- Identification: Hull symbol: D70
- Honours and awards: Atlantic 1943
- Fate: Returned to USN, 27 February 1946

United States
- Name: Ravager
- Acquired: 27 February 1946
- Stricken: 12 April 1946
- Fate: Sold for commercial use, 1 July 1947

United States
- Name: Robin Trent
- Acquired: 1 July 1947
- Fate: Scrapped, 1973

General characteristics
- Class & type: Bogue-class escort carrier (USA); Attacker-class escort carrier (UK)
- Displacement: 7,800 long tons (7,900 t) (standard); 14,170 long tons (14,400 t) (full load)
- Length: 465 ft (142 m) (lwl); 495 ft 8 in (151.08 m) (max)
- Beam: 69 ft 6 in (21.18 m); 111 ft 6 in (33.99 m) (extreme width)
- Draught: 24 ft 8 in (7.52 m)
- Installed power: 2 × boilers; 8,500 shp (6,300 kW)
- Propulsion: 1 × steam turbines; 1 × shaft
- Speed: 18 kn (33 km/h; 21 mph)
- Range: 27,300 nmi (50,600 km; 31,400 mi) at 11 kn (20 km/h; 13 mph)
- Complement: 646, excluding air group
- Armament: Varied by ship: 2 × 4 in (102 mm) /50, 5 in (127 mm) /38 or 5 in/51 guns (1×2); 4 × twin 40 mm (1.57 in) Bofors anti-aircraft guns (AA) (4×2); 8 × twin 20 mm (0.79 in) Oerlikon AA cannons; 10 × single 20 mm Oerlikon AA cannons
- Aircraft carried: 20
- Aviation facilities: 1 × catapult; 2 × elevators

Service record
- Operations: Battle of the Atlantic (1943–44)

HMS Ravager (D70) was an Attacker-class escort carrier built in the United States (as part of the Bogue class) and operated by the Royal Navy during World War II.

Ravager was initially constructed in the U.S. by Seattle-Tacoma Shipbuilding in Tacoma, in 1942. She was purchased by the U.S. Navy and was converted to an escort carrier at Commercial Iron Works, Portland, Oregon. Upon completion in 1943 she was transferred to the Royal Navy and named HMS Ravager.

The ship initially served as a convoy escort in the Atlantic theatre. Later in the war she was used mainly as a deck-landing training carrier. In February 1946 she was returned to the US Navy and sold for civilian use in July 1947, being renamed Robin Trent and later Trent. She was scrapped in 1973.

== Construction ==
Ravager (AVG-24) was laid down as MC hull 240 on 11 April 1942, by Seattle-Tacoma Shipbuilding Corp., Tacoma, Washington. She was intended to be named Charger, but was named Ravager when launched 16 July 1942; sponsored by Mrs. C. G. Mitchell; acquired by the U.S. Navy and transferred to the United Kingdom under lend-lease on 25 April 1943; and commissioned in the Royal Navy the same day.

== Design and description ==
These ships were all larger and had a greater aircraft capacity than all the preceding American built escort carriers. They were also all laid down as escort carriers and not converted merchant ships. All the ships had a complement of 646 men and an overall length of 495 feet 6 inches (151.0 m), a beam of 69 feet 6 inches (21.2 m) and a draught of 25 ft 6 in (7.8 m). Propulsion was provided by one shaft, two boilers and a steam turbine giving 8,500 shp (6,300 kW), which could propel the ship at 18 knots (33 km/h; 21 mph).

Aircraft facilities were a small combined bridge–flight control on the starboard side, two aircraft lifts 43 by 34 feet (13.1 by 10.4 m), one aircraft catapult and nine arrestor wires. Aircraft could be housed in the 260 feet (79.2 m) by 62 feet (18.9 m) hangar below the flight deck. Armament comprised: two 4 in (102 mm)/50, 5 in (127 mm)/38 or 5 in/51 Dual Purpose guns in single mounts, sixteen Bofors 40 mm Automatic Gun L/60 anti-aircraft guns in twin mounts and twenty 20 mm anti-aircraft cannons in single mounts. They had a maximum aircraft capacity of twenty-four aircraft which could be a mixture of Grumman Martlet, Vought F4U Corsair or Hawker Sea Hurricane fighter aircraft and Fairey Swordfish or Grumman Avenger anti-submarine aircraft.

== Service history ==
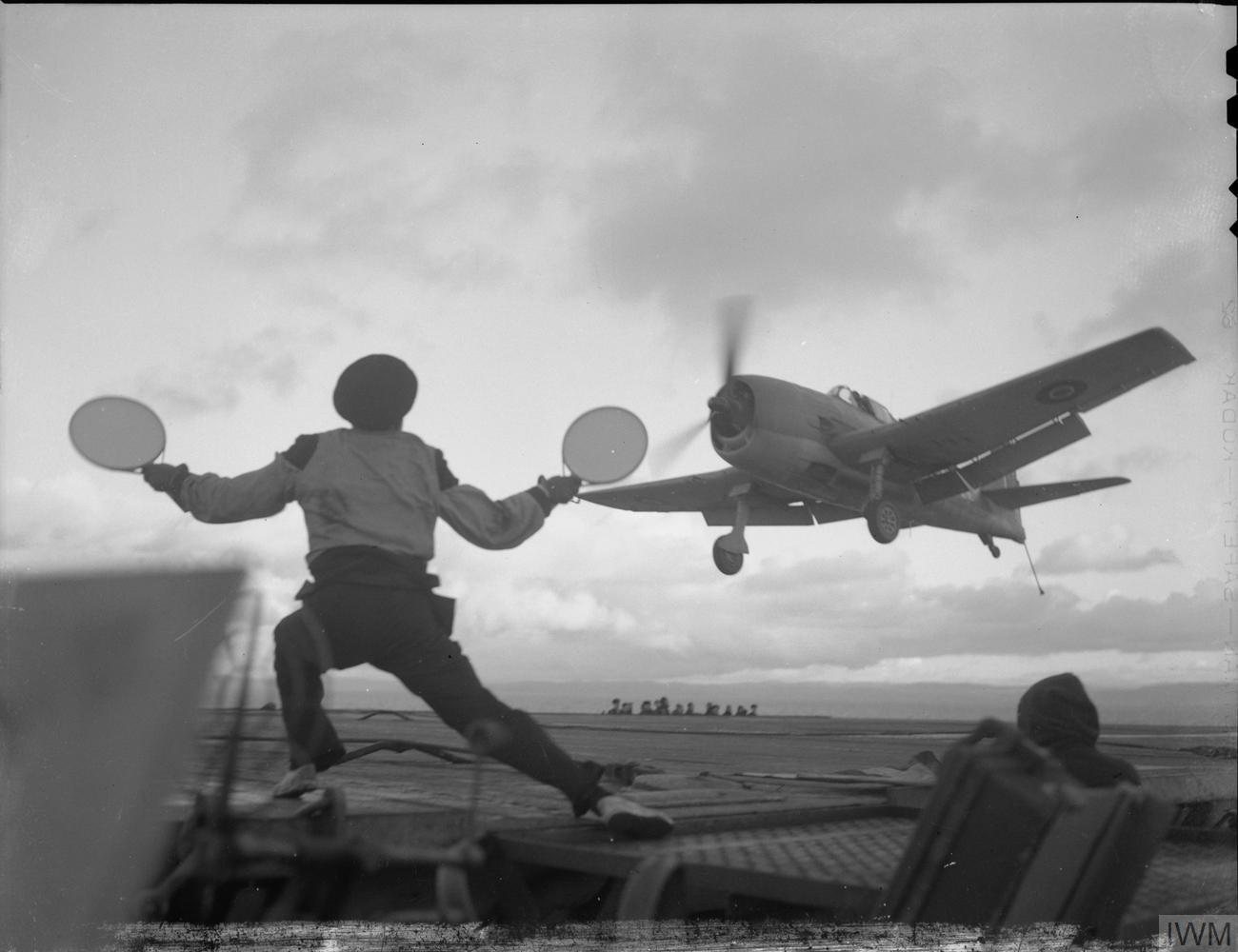
F6F Hellcat landing on Ravager

During World War II, Ravager, redesignated on U.S. Navy records as CVE-24 on 15 July 1943, operated in the Atlantic protecting Allied shipping from German U-boats. After the war ended, she arrived Norfolk, 9 February 1946, and was returned to the U.S. Navy there on 27 February, the day she was decommissioned by the Royal Navy. Ravager was sold to William B. St. John, of New York City, 1 July 1947, and was placed in merchant service as Robin Trent.

== Sources ==
- "Todd Pacific Shipyards, Inc., Tacoma WA". www.ShipbuildingHistory.com. 4 August 2012.
- "Altamaha I (AVG-6)". Dictionary of American Naval Fighting Ships. Naval History and Heritage Command.
- "HMS RAVAGER (D 70) - Attacker/Tracker-class Escort Aircraft Carrier". Naval-History.Net. 16 October 2010.
- Cocker, Maurice (2008). Aircraft-Carrying Ships of the Royal Navy. Stroud, Gloucestershire: The History Press. ISBN 978-0-7524-4633-2.
