= HMS Onslaught (G04) =

UK navy ship 1941 - 1977

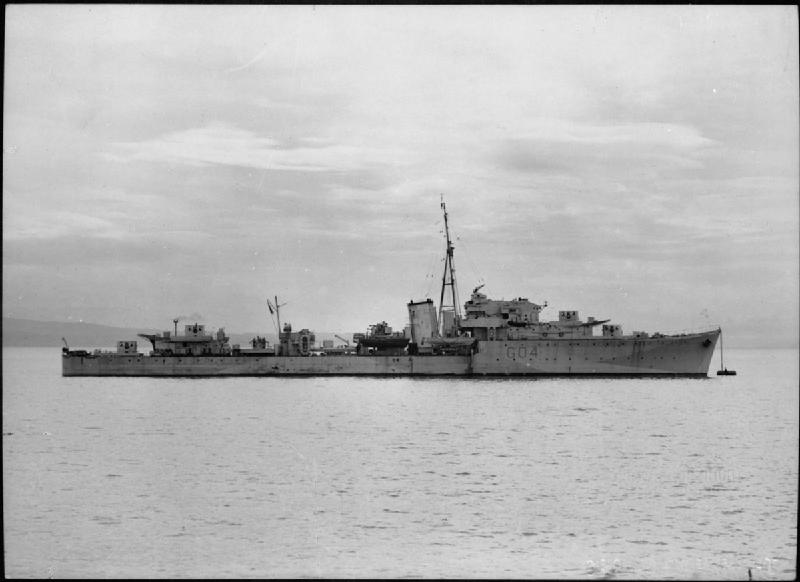
- HMS Onslaught during the Second World War

History

United Kingdom
- Name: Onslaught
- Ordered: 3 September 1939
- Builder: Fairfield Shipbuilding and Engineering Company, Govan
- Laid down: 14 January 1941
- Launched: 9 October 1941
- Commissioned: 19 June 1942
- Identification: Pennant number: G04 later D04
- Fate: Transferred to Pakistan, 6 March 1951

Pakistan
- Name: Tughril
- Acquired: 6 March 1951
- Identification: Pennant number F204 changed to 261 in 1963
- Fate: Scrapped 1977

General characteristics
- Class & type: O-class destroyer
- Displacement: 1,610 long tons (1,640 t) (standard)
- Length: 345 ft (105.2 m) (o/a)
- Beam: 35 ft (10.7 m)
- Draught: 13 ft 6 in (4.1 m)
- Installed power: 2 × Admiralty 3-drum boilers; 40,000 shp (29,828 kW)
- Propulsion: 2 × shafts; 2 × geared steam turbines
- Speed: 37 knots (69 km/h; 43 mph)
- Range: 3,850 nmi (7,130 km; 4,430 mi) at 20 knots (37 km/h; 23 mph)
- Complement: 176+
- Armament: 4 × single QF 4.7 in (120 mm) guns; 1 × single QF 4 in (102 mm) AA gun; 1 × quad 2 pdr (40 mm (1.6 in)) AA gun; 4 × single 20 mm (0.8 in) AA guns; 1 × quadruple 21 in (533 mm) torpedo tubes; 4 × throwers and 2 × racks for 70 depth charges; 2 × Squid ASW Mortars (after 1957)

HMS Onslaught was an O-class destroyer of the Royal Navy which entered service in 1941. She was originally to have been named Pathfinder, but this was changed during construction. She was adopted by the Isle of Wight as part of the Warship Week campaign in 1942. After the Second World War she was sold to Pakistan and scrapped in 1977.

== Service history ==
=== Second World War service ===
On 19 June 1942 Onslaught was commissioned for service in the 17th Destroyer Flotilla, as part of the Home Fleet. She took part in convoy escort duties throughout the war, including the Arctic convoys and the Battle of the Atlantic. She also undertook patrol duties in the English Channel during the Normandy landings in 1944.

=== Postwar service ===
Onslaught remained in commission after VJ Day and in September 1945 was deployed for training duties at Portsmouth Gunnery School, HMS Excellent. In December she was detached to take part in Operation Deadlight, the destruction of surrendered U-boats in the Northwestern Approaches. Between 1946 and 1949 she was used as a submarine target ship in the Clyde. The ship was paid off early in 1950 and put on the Disposal List.

=== Pakistan service ===
She was transferred to the Pakistan Navy on 3 March 1951 and renamed PNS Tughril. In 1957 the ship was converted at Liverpool to a Type 16 anti-submarine frigate and remained on the Active List until 1975. She was scrapped in 1977.
