= 1837 Naval Air Squadron =

Inactive flying squadron of the Royal Navy's Fleet Air Arm

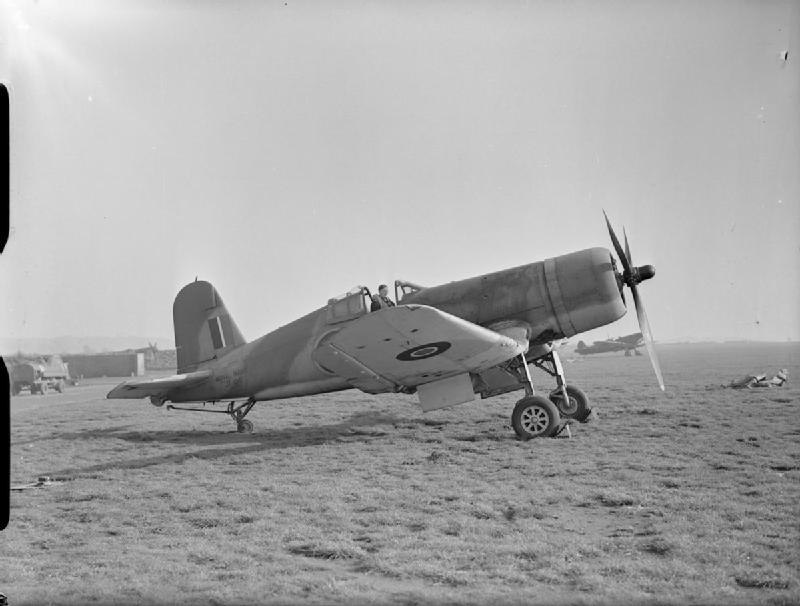
- Vought Corsair; an example of the type used by 1837 NAS
- Active: 1943–1944; 1945
- Disbanded: 18 August 1945
- Country: United Kingdom
- Branch: Royal Navy
- Type: Single-seat fighter squadron
- Role: Carrier-based fighter squadron
- Part of: Fleet Air Arm
- Home station: See Naval air stations section for full list.
- Engagements: World War II: Pacific War; Operation Pedal; Operation Crimson; Operation Banquet
- Battle honours: Sabang 1944; East Indies 1944-45

Commanders
- Notable commanders: Lieutenant Commander(A) Alfred Jack Sewell, DSC, RNVR

Insignia
- Identification Markings: 7A+ (1943-44); single letters (1945)

Aircraft flown
- Fighter: Vought Corsair

1837 Naval Air Squadron (1837 NAS) was a Fleet Air Arm (FAA) naval air squadron of the United Kingdom's Royal Navy (RN). The squadron was established in the United States at HMS Saker II, the Royal Naval Air Station at USNAS Quonset Point in January 1943. It boarded HMS Begum in January 1944, and landed at HMS Ringtail, RNAS Burscough, in February, then moved to HMS Blackcap, RNAS Stretton. As the only squadron in the 6th Naval Fighter Wing, it joined HMS Atheling and sailed to Ceylon, landing at the RAF station in Minneriya in April. The squadron boarded HMS Illustrious participating in operations over the Andaman Islands. In July, it provided air cover for a raid on Sabang. In August the squadron transferred to HMS Victorious but was disbanded into 1834 and 1836 Naval Air Squadrons in September. It was reformed in July 1945, at HMS Gannet, RNAS Eglinton, but was disbanded again in August at HMS Pintail, RNAS Nutts Corner.

== History ==
=== Single-seat fighter squadron (1943-1944) ===
1837 Naval Air Squadron was officially established in the United States (US) at RNAS Quonset Point (HMS Saker II), which had been commissioned at the US Naval Air Station Quonset Point a naval air station loaned to the Admiralty, in the state of Rhode Island, on 1 September 1943. This squadron was designated as a single-seater fighter unit and was commanded by Lieutenant Commander(A) A.J. Sewell, DSC, RNVR.

The aircraft it initially operated were ten Vought Corsair carrier-based fighter aircraft, these were the Vought Chance built F4U-1 and known as the Corsair Mk I in the Fleet Air Arm. Following the initial familiarisation with the aircraft and associated equipment, the squadron commenced rigorous training to ready itself for active deployment. This training encompassed a variety of flying exercises, including navigation drills, low-altitude manoeuvres, formation flying, and air combat tactics. Additionally, the squadron engaged in Aerodrome Dummy Deck Landing (ADDL) training and conducted night flying operations.

The squadron relocated to the RN Air Section located at US Naval Air Station Brunswick, Maine, on 1 October 1943, another naval air station loaned to the Admiralty, from August 1943. Shortly thereafter, on 4 October, the commanding officer, piloting Corsair JT190, and Lieutenant D.J.F. Watson, RNVR, in Corsair JT198, tragically lost their lives in a mid-air collision. Subsequently, Lieutenant Commander R. Pridham-Wippell, RN, was designated as the new commanding officer, effective 17 October.

At the beginning of the New Year, the Corsair Mk I was withdrawn and substituted with fourteen new Vought Corsair F4U-1A aircraft, which were designated Corsair Mk II within the Fleet Air Arm. On 9 January 1944, the squadron departed for the RN Air Section at USNAS Norfolk to conduct a day of Deck Landing Training (DLT) aboard the USS Charger on 13. Subsequently, 1837 Naval Air Squadron was scheduled to embark on a journey to the United Kingdom via the escort carrier, HMS Begum.

HMS Begum, a Ruler-class escort carrier, set sail from Norfolk Naval Station on the afternoon of 14 January, transporting 1837 Naval Air Squadron. After arriving in New York Harbor on 16 January, the ship resumed its voyage, departing the port on 18 January to join convoy UT.7, which was en route to Liverpool. The carrier reached Liverpool port on 29 January, at which time the squadron disembarked and made their way to the naval air station RNAS Burscough (HMS Ringtail) located in Lancashire.

On 12 February, the squadron relocated to RNAS Stretton (HMS Blackcap), Cheshire, subsequently departing for Ceylon aboard the Ruler-class escort carrier, HMS Atheling, on 26 February. Two days later it was integrated into the 6th Naval Fighter Wing. The squadron disembarked at the Royal Navy Air Section located at RAF Minneriya, Ceylon, on 13 April.

The squadron engaged in flight training in Ceylon and temporarily boarded the Maintenance Carrier HMS Unicorn, an aircraft repair ship and light aircraft carrier, on 5 June, for a two-day session of Deck Landing Training (DLT). Subsequently, on 19 June, the squadron transferred to the name ship of her class, HMS Illustrious, to enhance the carrier's fighter capabilities for operations targeting the Andaman Islands as part of Operation Pedal.

1837 Naval Air Squadron returned to RN Air Section Minneriya on 26 June; however, this visit was brief, as the unit was scheduled to re-embark on HMS Illustrious on 8 July to conduct a strike against targets located in Sabang, Sumatra, as part of Operation Crimson.

In early August 1944, the 1837 squadron was integrated into the 47th Naval Fighter Wing, alongside 1834 and 1836 Naval Air Squadrons. On 14 August 1944, the squadron boarded HMS Illustrious's sister ship, the Fleet Carrier, HMS Victorious to prepare for operations targeting the Padang airfield as part of Operation Banquet. The unit was ultimately disbanded on 9 September to facilitate the expansion of the 1834 and 1836 Naval Air Squadrons.

=== Single-seat fighter squadron (1945) ===
On 1 July 1945, 1837 Naval Air Squadron was reformed as a single-seat fighter unit at RNAS Eglinton (HMS Gannet), County Londonderry, Northern Ireland. It was equipped with twenty-two Vought Corsair, these were the Brewster built F3A-1 and F3A-1D, known as the Mk III in Fleet Air Arm service.

It was primarily sourced from 1835 Naval Air Squadron, and designated for the 4th Carrier Air Group aboard HMS Illustrious within the British Pacific Fleet. Following the conclusion of hostilities with Japan, the squadron was deemed unnecessary and subsequently disbanded on 18 August at RNAS Nutts Corner (HMS Pintail), County Antrim, Northern Ireland, with its aircraft transferred to No. 1 Naval Air Fighter School located at RNAS Yeovilton (HMS Heron), Somerset.

== Aircraft flown ==
1837 Naval Air Squadron flew three variants of only one aircraft type:

- Vought Corsair Mk I fighter-bomber (September 1943 - January 1944)
- Vought Corsair Mk II fighter-bomber (January - September 1944)
- Vought Corsair Mk III fighter-bomber (July - August 1945)

== Battle honours ==
The following Battle Honours have been awarded to 1837 Naval Air Squadron:

- Sabang 1945
- East Indies 1944-45

== Assignments ==
1837 Naval Air Squadron was assigned as needed to form part of a number of larger units:

- 6th Naval Fighter Wing (28 February - 14 August 1944)
- 47th Naval Fighter Wing (14 August - 9 September 1944)

== Naval air stations ==
1837 Naval Air Squadron operated from a number of naval air stations of the Royal Navy in the UK and overseas, a couple of Royal Navy fleet carriers and a couple of escort carriers:

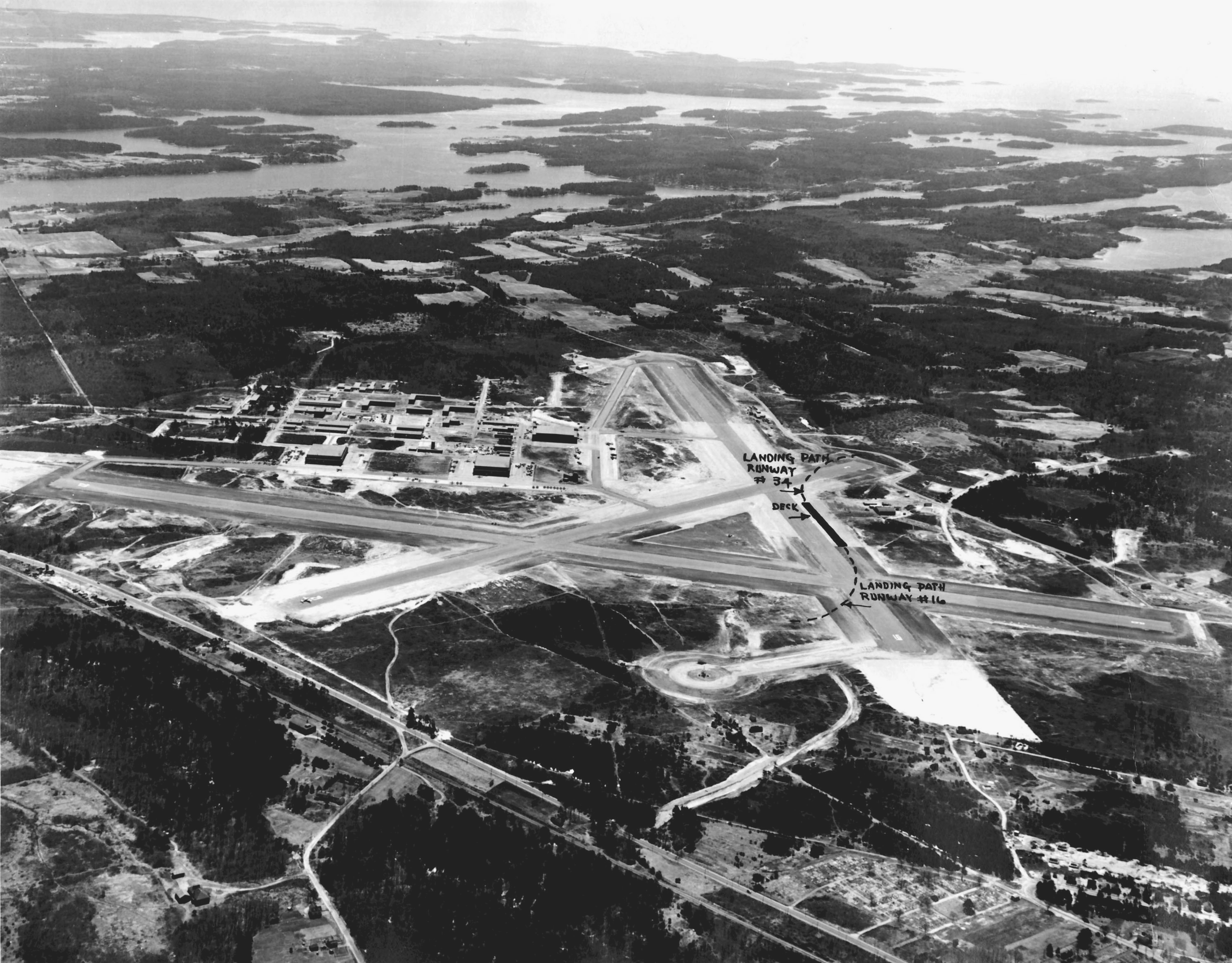
Naval Air Station Brunswick

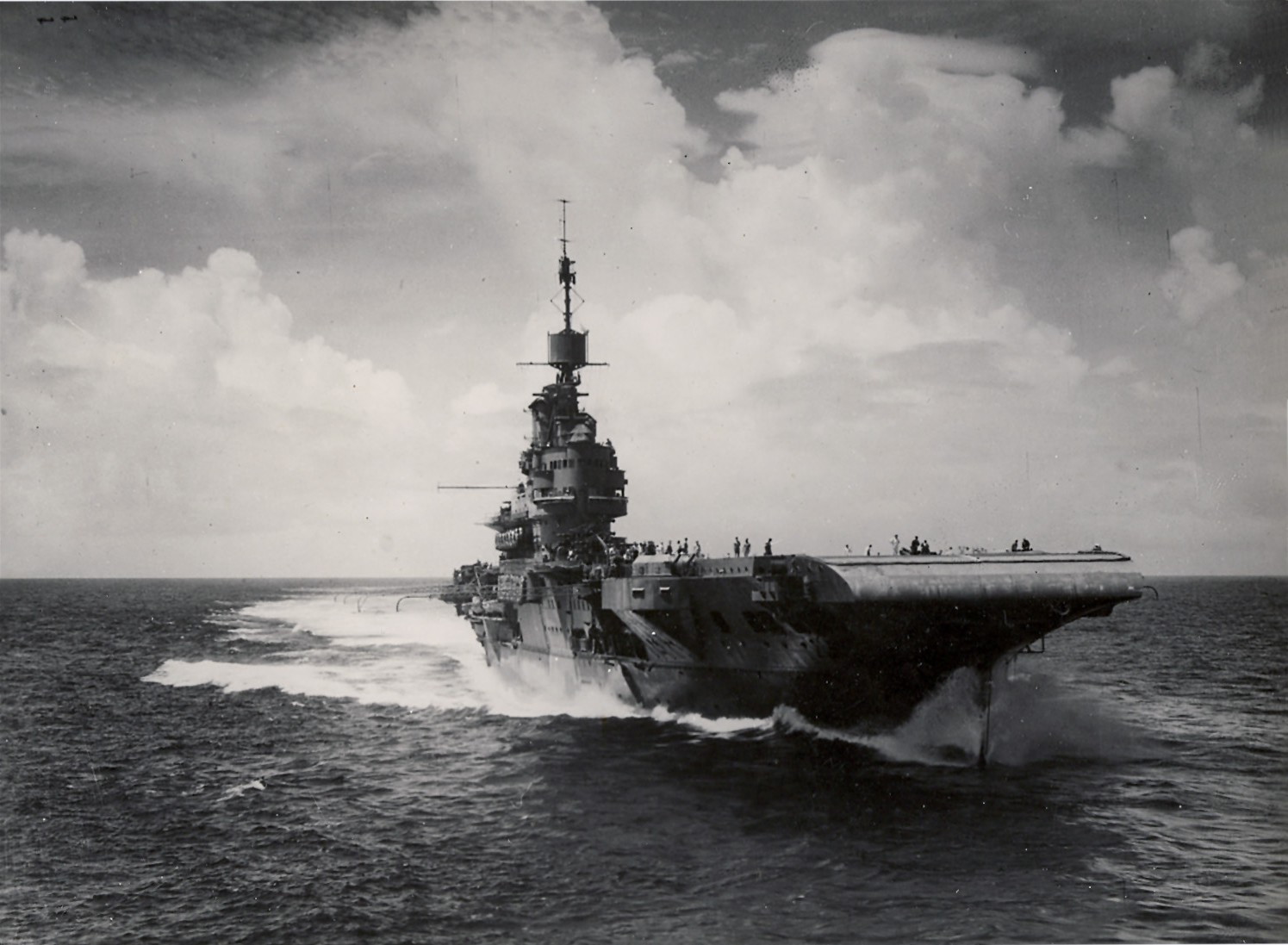
HMS Illustrious

1943 - 1944

- Royal Naval Air Station Quonset Point (HMS Saker II), Rhode Island, (1 September - 1 October 1943)
- RN Air Section Brunswick, Maine, (1 October 1943 – 9 January 1944)
- RN Air Section Norfolk, Virginia, (9 - 19 January 1944)
  - USS Charger (Deck Landing Training (DLT) 13 January 1944)
- HMS Begum (19 January - 1 February 1944)
- Royal Naval Air Station Burscough (HMS Ringtail), Lancashire, (1 - 12 February 1944)
- Royal Naval Air Station Stretton (HMS Blackap), Cheshire, (12 - 26 February 1944)
- Royal Air Force Renfrew, Renfrewshire, for HMS Atheling (26 February - 12 April 1944)
- RN Air Section Minneriya, Ceylon, (12 April - 19 June 1944)
  - HMS Unicorn (DLT 5 - 7 June 1944)
- HMS Illustrious (19 - 23 June 1944)
- RN Air Section Minneriya, Ceylon, (23 June - 8 July 1944)
- HMS Illustrious (8 - 27 July 1944)
- Royal Naval Air Station Colombo Racecourse (HMS Berhunda), Ceylon, (27 July - 14 August 1944)
- HMS Victorious (14 - 28 August 1944)
- Royal Naval Air Station Colombo Racecourse (HMS Berhunda), Ceylon, (28 August - 9 September 1944)
- disbanded - (9 September 1944)

1945

- Royal Naval Air Station Eglinton (HMS Gannet), County Londonderry, (1 - 31 July 1945)
- Royal Naval Air Station Nutts Corner (HMS Pintail), County Antrim, (31 July - 18 August 1945)
- disbanded - (18 August 1945)

== Commanding officers ==
List of commanding officers of 1837 Naval Air Squadron with date of appointment:

1943 - 1944

- Lieutenant Commander(A) A.J. Sewell, DSC, RNVR, from 1 September 1943 (KiFA 3 October 1943)
- Lieutenant Commander R. Pridham-Wippell, RN, from 17 October 1943
- disbanded - 9 September 1944

1945

- Lieutenant Commander(A) R. Tebble, RNVR, from 1 July 1945
- disbanded - 18 August 1945

Note: Abbreviation (A) signifies Air Branch of the RN or RNVR.
