= 47th Naval Fighter Wing =

Royal Navy Fleet Air Arm aircraft wing

- White Ensign
- Active: 17 January 1944 - 30 June 1945
- Country: United Kingdom
- Branch: Royal Navy
- Type: Wing
- Role: Fighter
- Size: Two / three squadrons
- Part of: Fleet Air Arm
- Aircraft carrier: HMS Victorious
- Engagements: World War II: European theatre of World War II; Operation Tungsten; Operation Lombard; Pacific War; Operation Crimson; Operation Banquet; Operation Light; Operation Millet; Operation Lentil; Operation Meridian; Operation Iceberg

Insignia
- Wing Code: T

47th Naval Fighter Wing ("47 Wing") was a Fleet Air Arm (FAA) aircraft wing of the United Kingdom’s Royal Navy (RN), which was active during World War II. It was formed in January 1944 at Royal Naval Air Station at Stretton, Cheshire (HMS Blackcap). The wing consisted mainly of 1834 and 1836 Naval Air Squadrons and both units were equipped with Vought Corsair fighter aircraft. The wing embarked in the Illustrious-class aircraft carrier, HMS Victorious, during March 1944 to cover with air strikes against the German battleship Tirpitz.

During June, the carrier and wing travelled to Ceylon, and the wing was augmented with the Vought Corsair equipped 1837 Naval Air Squadron, in August 1944, however, this squadron disbanded into the other two shortly afterwards. The wing saw action against Japanese forces, before forming the basis of and being absorbed into the 1st Carrier Air Group in June 1945.

== History ==
On 17 January 1944 the 47th Naval Fighter Wing (47 Wing) was formed at HMS Blackcap, the Royal Naval Air Station at Stretton, Cheshire, England, under the leadership of Lieutenant Commander F.R.A. Turnbull, DSC, RN. The wing was originally to have comprised 1834, 1835 and 1836 Naval Air Squadrons, all equipped with Vought Corsair fighter aircraft, but this was changed when 1835 Naval Air Squadron was disbanded to form the nucleus of 732 Naval Air Squadron, the Corsair Operational Training Unit in the United States.

The wing was transferred to RNAS Machrihanish (HMS Landrail) in Argyll and Bute, Scotland, on 14 February. This relocation was a component of their continuous preparations for deployment aboard the Illustrious-class aircraft carrier, HMS Victorious, in March.

=== Tirpitz ===
The carrier was later designated to participate in several coordinated assaults, including Operation Tungsten, a Fleet Air Arm operation aimed at the German battleship Tirpitz, which was anchored at its base in Kåfjord, Alta, situated in the isolated northern area of Norway. The strategy for the assault was predicated on executing two dive-bombing strikes, with the Vought Corsair fighters operating from HMS Victorious were designated to safeguard against enemy German aircraft.

This was followed by Operation Lombard, which was a British naval operation aimed at diverting German naval activities along the northern coast of German-occupied Norway, designed to draw German focus away from northwestern France, thereby facilitating support for the forthcoming Operation Overlord. A force which included 47 Wing from HMS Victorious was deployed to conduct an assault on a German convoy.

=== Far East ===
In June, HMS Victorious set sail from the United Kingdom, heading towards Ceylon. The aircraft carrier arrived in Ceylon the subsequent month, and on 7 July, the Vought Corsair aircraft of 47 Wing were disembarked to RNAS Colombo Racecourse (HMS Berhunda) in Colombo, Ceylon.

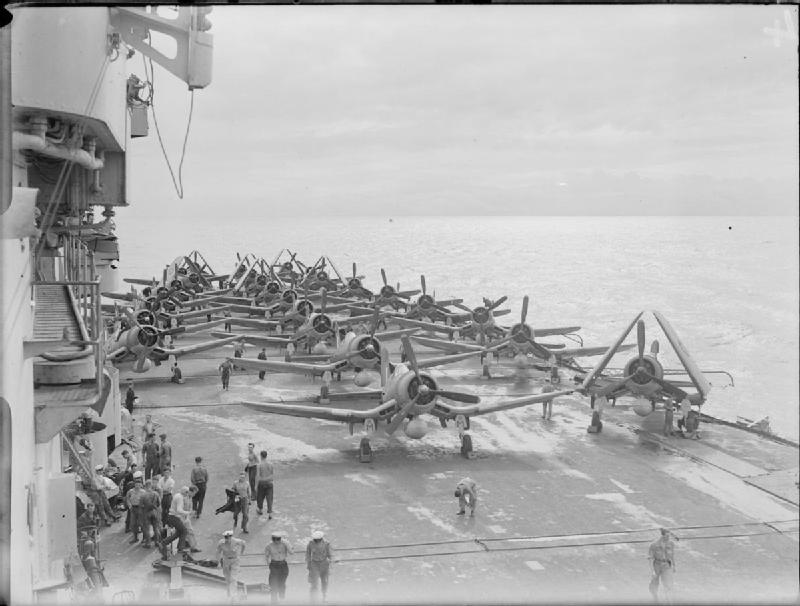
47 Wing on board HMS Victorious during the attack against Sigli, Sumatra.

Operations were conducted against targets from July 1944 to January 1945. Operation Crimson involved assaults on airfields located near Sabang, Sumatra. In early August 1944, 1837 squadron was integrated into the 47th Naval Fighter Wing. The squadron boarded HMS Victorious to prepare for operations as part of the wing, targeting the Padang airfield as part of Operation Banquet. 1837 Naval Air Squadron was ultimately disbanded on 9 September to facilitate the expansion of 1834 and 1836 Naval Air Squadrons.

The wing was involved in further operations against the Japanese forces: Operation Banquet consisted of a series of attacks targeting the Padang airfield, Emmehaven harbor, and the Indaroeng Cement Works in Padang. Operation Light was a divided initiative focused on carrying out air strikes against Japanese troops located in Sigli, Northern Sumatra, while simultaneously performing aerial reconnaissance missions over the Nicobar Islands. Operation Millet involved a series of naval bombardments and aerial strikes targeting Japanese facilities in the Nicobar Islands, conducted between 17 and 20 October.

=== British Pacific Fleet ===
On 22 November, HMS Victorious and her accompanying wing were transferred to the newly formed British Pacific Fleet (BPF). Operation Lentil subsequently commenced, concentrating on targeting the oil refineries located in Pangkalan Brandan, Northern Sumatra. Operation Meridian followed, focusing on the Japanese oil assets located in the Palembang area of southern Sumatra.. Operation Iceberg was subsequently initiated with the objective of neutralising six airfields situated within the Sakishima Gunto.

=== Disbandment ===
On 30 June 1945, the 47th Naval Fighter Wing was officially disbanded into the 1st Carrier Air Group (1 CAG), as the Admiralty transitioned to the United States Navy's model of Carrier Air Groups.

== Squadrons ==
47th Naval Fighter Wing consisted of mainly two but briefly three Fleet Air Arm squadrons:

- 1834 Naval Air Squadron, January 1944 - June 1945
- 1836 Naval Air Squadron, January 1944 - June 1945
- 1837 Naval Air Squadron, August - September 1944

== Naval air stations and carrier deployments ==
47 Wing primarily conducted operations from various Royal Navy naval air stations both within the United Kingdom and overseas, as well as from the Royal Navy's fleet carrier HMS Victorious. The components of the wing were occasionally deployed independently from one another:

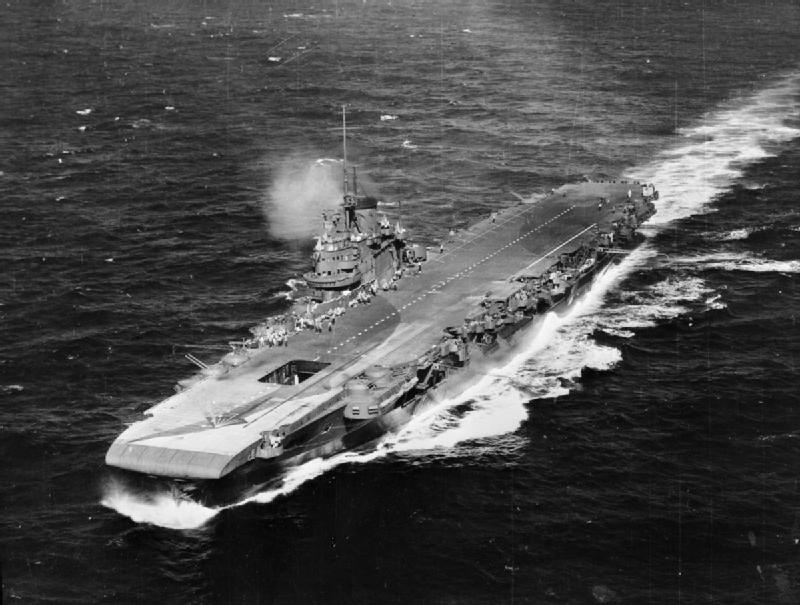
HMS Victorious

- Royal Naval Air Station Stretton (HMS Blackcap), Cheshire - 47 Wing formed 17 January 1944.
  - 1834 Naval Air Squadron (47 Wing formed - 1 February 1944)
  - 1836 Naval Air Squadron (3 - 14 February 1944)
- Royal Naval Air Station Burscough (HMS Ringtail), Lancashire.
  - 1836 Naval Air Squadron (47 Wing formed - 3 February 1944)
- Royal Naval Air Station Machrihanish (HMS Landrail), Argyll and Bute.
  - 1834 Naval Air Squadron (1 - 7 February, 11 - 12 February, 15 February - 8 March, 20 - 24 March 1944)
  - 1836 Naval Air Squadron (14 February - 8 March 1944)
- Royal Naval Air Station Grimsetter (HMS Robin), Mainland, Orkney.
  - 1834 Naval Air Squadron (24 - 30 March 1944)
- HMS Ravager
  - 1834 Naval Air Squadron (Deck Landing Training (DLT) 7 - 11 February 1944)
- HMS Victorious
  - 1834 Naval Air Squadron (12 - 15 February, 8 - 20 March, 30 March - 7 July, 19 - 27 July, 10 - 28 August, 14 - 25 September, 11 - 28 October, 19 December 1944 - 10 February 1945, 27 February - 5 June, 26 - 30 June 1945)
  - 1836 Naval Air Squadron (8 March - 7 July, 19 - 27 July, 4 - 28 August, 14 - 25 September, 11 - 23 October, 20 December 1944 - 10 February 1945, 27 February - 5 June, 26 - 30 June 1945)
  - 1837 Naval Air Squadron (14 - 28 August 1944)
- Royal Naval Air Station Colombo Racecourse (HMS Berhunda), Ceylon.
  - 1834 Naval Air Squadron (7 - 19 July, 28 August - 14 September, 28 October - 19 December 1944)
  - 1836 Naval Air Squadron (28 August - 14 September, 25 September - 11 October, 23 October - 10 November, 17 November - 20 December 1944)
  - 1837 Naval Air Squadron (28 August - 9 September 1944)
- RN Air Section Minneriya, Ceylon.
  - 1836 Naval Air Squadron (7 - 19 July, 27 July - 4 August 1944)
  - 1834 Naval Air Squadron (27 July - 10 August 1944)
- Royal Naval Air Station Puttalam (HMS Rajaliya), Ceylon.
  - 1834 Naval Air Squadron (25 September - 11 October 1944)
  - 1836 Naval Air Squadron (10 - 17 November 1944)
- Royal Naval Air Station Nowra (HMS Nabbington), New South Wales.
  - 1834 Naval Air Squadron (10 - 27 February 1945)
  - 1836 Naval Air Squadron (10 - 27 February 1945)
- Royal Naval Air Station Schofields (HMS Nabthorpe), New South Wales.
  - 1834 Naval Air Squadron (5 - 26 June 1945)
  - 1836 Naval Air Squadron (5 - 26 June 1945)
- disbanded into 1st Carrier Air Group, 30 June 1945

== Aircraft ==
Naval Air Squadrons assigned to 47 Wing flew different variants of only one aircraft type:

- Vought Corsair Mk II fighter aircraft (1944 - 1945)
- Vought Corsair Mk IV fighter aircraft (1945)

== Wing leader ==
List of commanding officers of the 47th Naval Fighter Wing, with date of appointment:

- Lieutenant Commander(A) F.R.A. Turnbull, DSC, RN, 17 January 1944
- Major R.C. Hay, DSC, RM, 14 August 1944 (Lieutenant Colonel 12 December 1944)
- disbanded into 1st Carrier Air Group, 30 June 1945

Note: Abbreviation (A) signifies Air Branch of the RN or RNVR.

== See also ==
- Fleet Air Arm
- List of aircraft wings of the Royal Navy
- 1834 Naval Air Squadron
- 1836 Naval Air Squadron
- 1837 Naval Air Squadron
- 1st Carrier Air Group
- HMS Victorious
- Eastern Fleet
- British Pacific Fleet
