= 1834 Naval Air Squadron =

Inactive Royal Navy Fleet Air Arm and Reserve Air Squadron

- Squadron badge
- Active: 1943–1945; 1953–1955
- Disbanded: 30 April 1955
- Country: United Kingdom
- Branch: Royal Navy
- Type: Single-seat fighter squadron; Royal Naval Volunteer Reserve Air Squadron
- Role: Carrier-based fighter squadron
- Part of: Fleet Air Arm
- Home station: See Naval air stations section for full list.
- Mottos: 'Cleaving earth and sky'
- Engagements: World War II: European theatre of World War II; Operation Tungsten; Operation Lombard; Pacific War; Operation Crimson; Operation Banquet; Operation Light; Operation Millet; Operation Lentil; Operation Meridian; Operation Iceberg; Air raids on Japan
- Battle honours: Norway 1944; Sabang 1944; East Indies 1944-45; Palembang 1945; Okinawa 1945; Japan 1945

Commanders
- Notable commanders: Lieutenant Commander(A) A.M. Tritton, DSC, RNVR

Insignia
- Squadron Badge Description: Blue, in base barry wavy of six white and blue a sword point downwards and a plough in saltire gold (1955) [The post-war CO and many of his officers were farmers, the sword represented the Sea Fury in the air and a plough on the ground]
- Identification Markings: 9A+ (Corsair to October 1943); 7A+ (by April 1944); T7A+ (January 1945); 111-128 (March 1945)
- Fin Carrier Code: P (March 1945)

Aircraft flown
- Fighter: Vought Corsair; Hawker Sea Fury
- Trainer: North American Harvard; Boulton Paul Sea Balliol

1834 Naval Air Squadron (1834 NAS) was a Fleet Air Arm (FAA) naval air squadron of the United Kingdom’s Royal Navy (RN). It was established as a single-seat fighter squadron in July 1943, at RNAS Quonset Point (HMS Saker II) in the United States. During its formation, the squadron underwent deck landing training aboard the USS Charger. The squadron embarked in HMS Khedive in November, from where it traveled to the UK, disembarking at RNAS Maydown. The squadron then relocated to RN Air Section Speke, returned to RNAS Maydown on November 22, and ultimately settled at HMS Blackcap the Royal Naval Air Station at Stretton in December. In January 1944, it became part of the 47th Naval Fighter Wing, and in February the squadron moved to HMS Landrail, RNAS Machrihanish, to prepare for deck landing training on HMS Ravager, before joining the aircraft carrier HMS Victorious. Following its provision of air cover during assaults on the battleship Tirpitz, the squadron embarked with the carrier to the Far East in June, disembarking at HMS Berhunda, RNAS Colombo Racecourse in July. From July to January 1945, the squadron supported operations against Sumatra, later joining the British Pacific Fleet and participating in missions against the Sakishima Gunto from March to May 1945. As part of the 1st Carrier Air Group, the squadron conducted strikes in the Tokyo region, with the carrier proceeding to Australia after the conclusion of the war. In the postwar period, the squadron left its aircraft at HMS Nabbington, RNAS Nowra, near Sydney, and returned home aboard the carrier, officially disbanding upon arrival in October. It reformed as a Royal Naval Volunteer Reserve Air Branch fighter squadron, in the Southern Air Division, from 1953 and disbanded in 1955.

== History ==
=== Single-seat fighter squadron (1943-1945) ===
The personnel of 1834 Naval Air Squadron gathered at both HMS Merlin, the Royal Naval Air Station at Donibristle, Dunfermline and HMS Waxwing, which served as the Fleet Air Arm Transit Camp, Royal Naval Air Establishment (RNAE) Townhill, Dunfermline, Fife, on 15 June 1943 for passage to the USA.

The squadron was formally established on 15 July at RNAS Quonset Point (HMS Saker II), which refers to the United States Naval Air Station Quonset Point situated in Rhode Island. The Admiralty obtained access to this facility beginning in October 1942. The unit was established as a single-seat fighter squadron, led by Lieutenant Commander(A) A.M. Tritton, DSC, RNVR, and was originally equipped with a fleet of ten Vought Corsair aircraft. The aircraft in question were the F4U-1 variants, constructed by Vought Chance, which were designated as the Corsair Mk I within the Fleet Air Arm.

Following initial familiarisation, the flying training regimen encompassed navigation exercises, low-altitude maneuvers, formation flying, and combat tactics. Additionally, training included Aerodrome Dummy Deck Landing (ADDL) and night flying. On 27 August, the squadron relocated to RN Air Section Brunswick at the US Naval Air Station Brunswick in Maine to further their training. Another critical skill that required extensive practice was carrier deck landing. Consequently, the squadron temporarily transferred to RN Air Section Norfolk at USNAS Norfolk on 14 October to engage in Deck Landing Training (DLT) aboard the training carrier USS Charger in Chesapeake Bay, before returning to Brunswick on the 17.

On the 30, the squadron departed for the RN Air Section at USNAS Floyd Bennett Field to replace their Mk I aircraft with Mk II. Following this exchange, they boarded the Ruler-class escort carrier, HMS Khedive, which then set sail for New York to join convoy UT.4a. This convoy departed from New York on 5 November, with its destination set for the Clyde. UT.4a reached the Clyde on 15 November, after which HMS Khedive continued to Liverpool the next day to unload its cargo. Subsequently, the squadron flew to RNAS Maydown in Northern Ireland, arriving on the 22, before relocating to RNAS Stretton (HMS Blackcap), Cheshire.

The squadron became part of the newly formed 47th Naval Fighter Wing (47 Wing), in conjunction with the 1836 Naval Air Squadron, under the leadership of Lieutenant Commander F.R.A. Turnbull, DSC, RN. By 1 February 1944, it relocated to RNAS Machrihanish (HMS Landrail), Argyll and Bute, Scotland, to prepare for deck landing training on the Attacker-class escort carrier,HMS Ravager, subsequently joining the Illustrious-class aircraft carrier, HMS Victorious on 12 February. The squadron was later tasked with participating in several planned operations, including Operation Tungsten, a Fleet Air Arm mission aimed at the German battleship Tirpitz, which was stationed in a norwegian fjord.

In June, HMS Victorious departed from the UK, destined for Ceylon (now Sri Lanka). The carrier reached Ceylon the following month, at which point the Vought Corsair aircraft belonging to the squadron were disembarked to RNAS Colombo Racecourse (HMS Berhunda), Colombo, Ceylon, on 7 July.

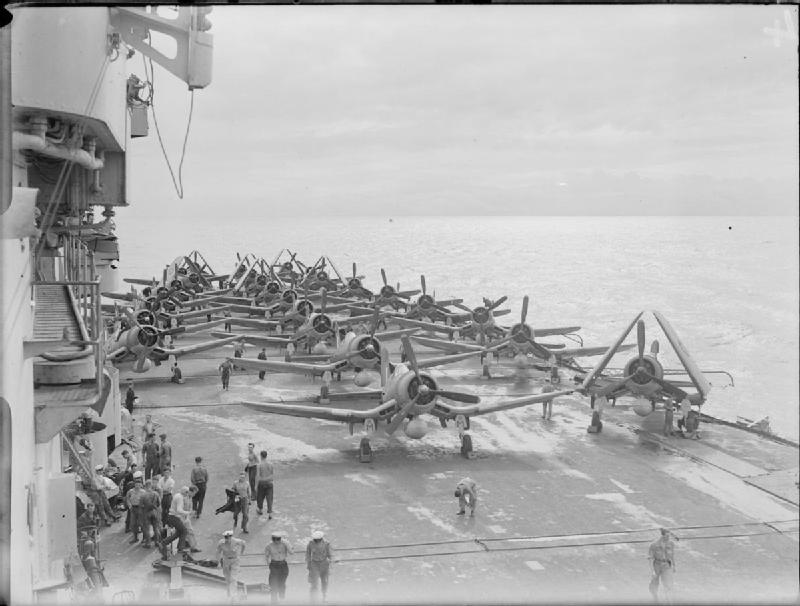
Vought Corsairs of 1834 Naval Air Squadron and 1836 Naval Air Squadron, on board HMS Victorious, during the carrier-borne air attack against the Japanese repair and maintenance centre at Sigli, Sumatra

Operations were conducted against targets from July 1944 to January 1945. Operation Crimson involved assaults on airfields located near Sabang, Sumatra. Operation Banquet comprised a sequence of assaults aimed at the Padang airfield, Emmehaven harbour, and the Indaroeng Cement Works located in Padang. Operation Light represented a dual-faceted initiative designed to carry out air strikes against Japanese military forces located in Sigli, Northern Sumatra, while simultaneously engaging in aerial reconnaissance missions over the Nicobar Islands. Operation Millet involved a series of naval bombardments and aerial strikes targeting Japanese facilities in the Nicobar Islands, conducted between 17 and 20 October.

On 22 November, HMS Victorious and her squadrons were transferred to the newly formed British Pacific Fleet (BPF). Operation Lentil subsequently commenced, concentrating on targeting the oil refineries located in Pangkalan Brandan, Northern Sumatra. Operation Meridian followed, focusing on the Japanese oil assets located in the Palembang area of southern Sumatra. Operation Iceberg was subsequently initiated with the objective of neutralising six airfields situated in the Sakishima Gunto.

On 30 June, the 47th Naval Fighter Wing was officially disbanded as the Admiralty transitioned to the United States model of Carrier Air Groups. In the revised organisational framework, all squadrons allocated to a carrier were consolidated into a Carrier Air Group (CAG). HMS Victorious was assigned the 1st Carrier Air Group, comprising 1834, 1836, and 849 Naval Air Squadrons, under the command of Commander J.C.N. Shrubsole, RN. The squadron was re-equipped with a new variant of the Vought Corsair, specifically the FG-1D model produced by Goodyear, which was designated as the Corsair Mk IV by the Fleet Air Arm.

The squadron engaged in missions aimed at the Japanese mainland, focusing specifically on targets within the Tokyo area. After Victory over Japan Day, the carrier made its way to Australia. In the aftermath of the war, the squadron left its aircraft at RNAS Nowra (HMS Nabbington), Sydney, Australia, before the personnel made the journey back to the United Kingdom aboard the carrier, where it was officially disbanded upon arrival on 31 October 1945.

== Royal Naval Volunteer Reserve Air Squadron ==
=== Fighter squadron ===
On 10 October 1953, 1834 Naval Air Squadron was re-established at RAF Benson in Oxfordshire, serving as a fighter unit within the Royal Naval Volunteer Reserve under the Southern Air Division, under the command of Lieutenant Commander(A) A.C.B. Ford VRD, DSC, RNVR. The squadron was primarily outfitted with Hawker Sea Fury FB.11 fighter-bomber aircraft. On 16 January 1954, it relocated to RNAS Yeovilton (HMS Heron) in Somerset, where it was officially disbanded on 30 April 1955.

== Aircraft flown ==
1834 Naval Air Squadron flew different variants of only one aircraft type during World War II:

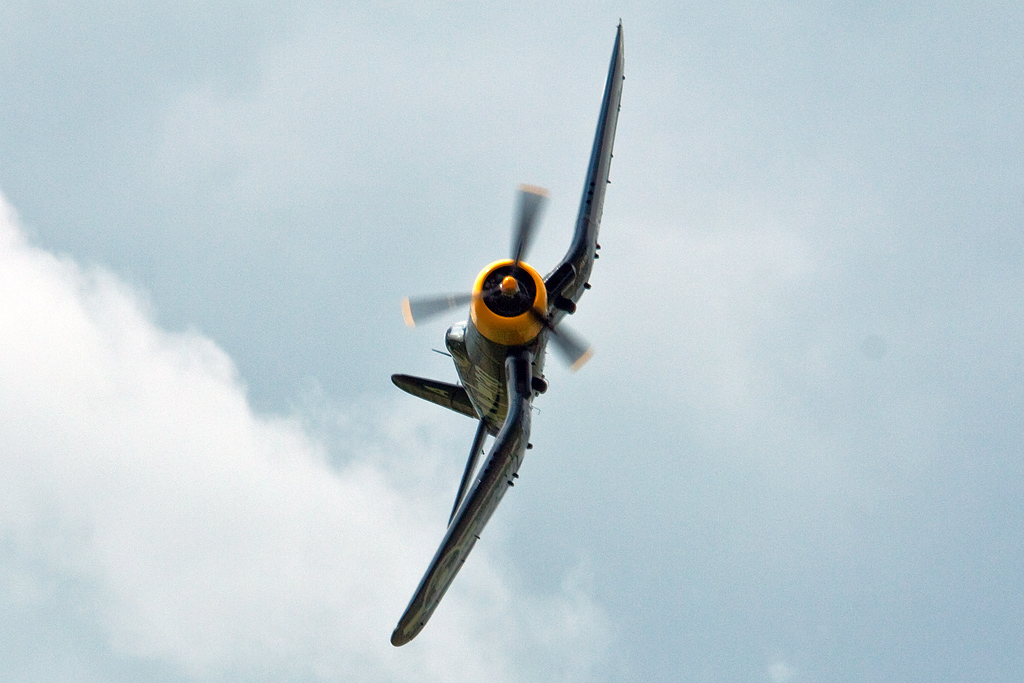
Vought Corsair Mk IV

- Vought Corsair Mk I fighter aircraft (July - October 1943)
- Vought Corsair Mk II fighter aircraft (October 1943 - August 1945)
- Vought Corsair Mk IV fighter aircraft (April - August 1945)
- Hawker Sea Fury FB.11 fighter-bomber aircraft (October 1953 - April 1955)
- Hawker Sea Fury T.20 two-seat training aircraft (October 1953 - April 1955)
- North American Harvard IIB advanced trainer aircraft (October 1953 - April 1955)
- Boulton Paul Sea Balliol T.Mk 21 advanced trainer aircraft (October 1954 - April 1955)

== Battle honours ==
The Battle Honours awarded to 1834 Naval Air Squadron are:

- Norway 1944
- Sabang 1944
- East Indies 1944-45
- Palembang 1945
- Okinawa 1945
- Japan 1945

== Assignments ==
1834 Naval Air Squadron was assigned as needed to form part of a number of larger units:

- 47th Naval Fighter Wing (17 January 1944 - 30 June 1945)
- 1st Carrier Air Group (30 June - 8 September 1945)

== Naval air stations ==
1834 Naval Air Squadron operated mostly from a number of naval air stations of the Royal Navy in the UK and overseas, a Royal Navy fleet carrier and a couple of escort carriers:

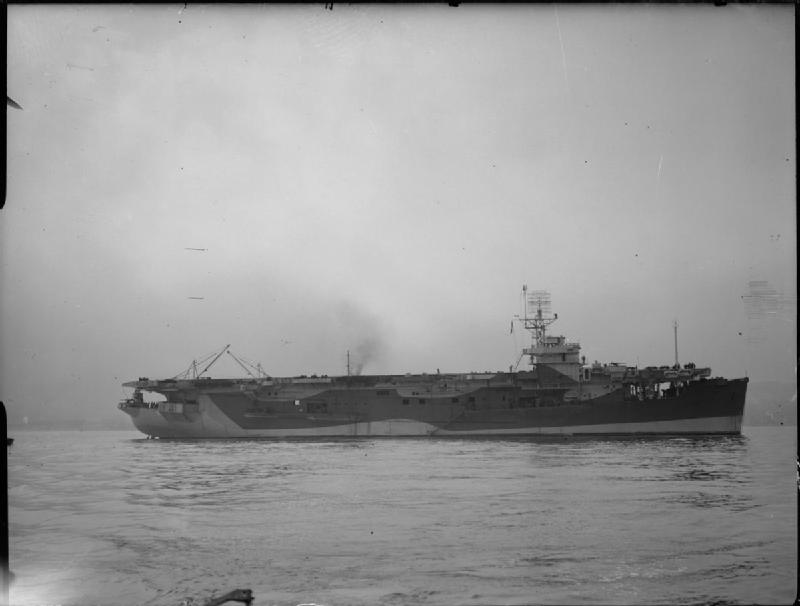
HMS Khedive

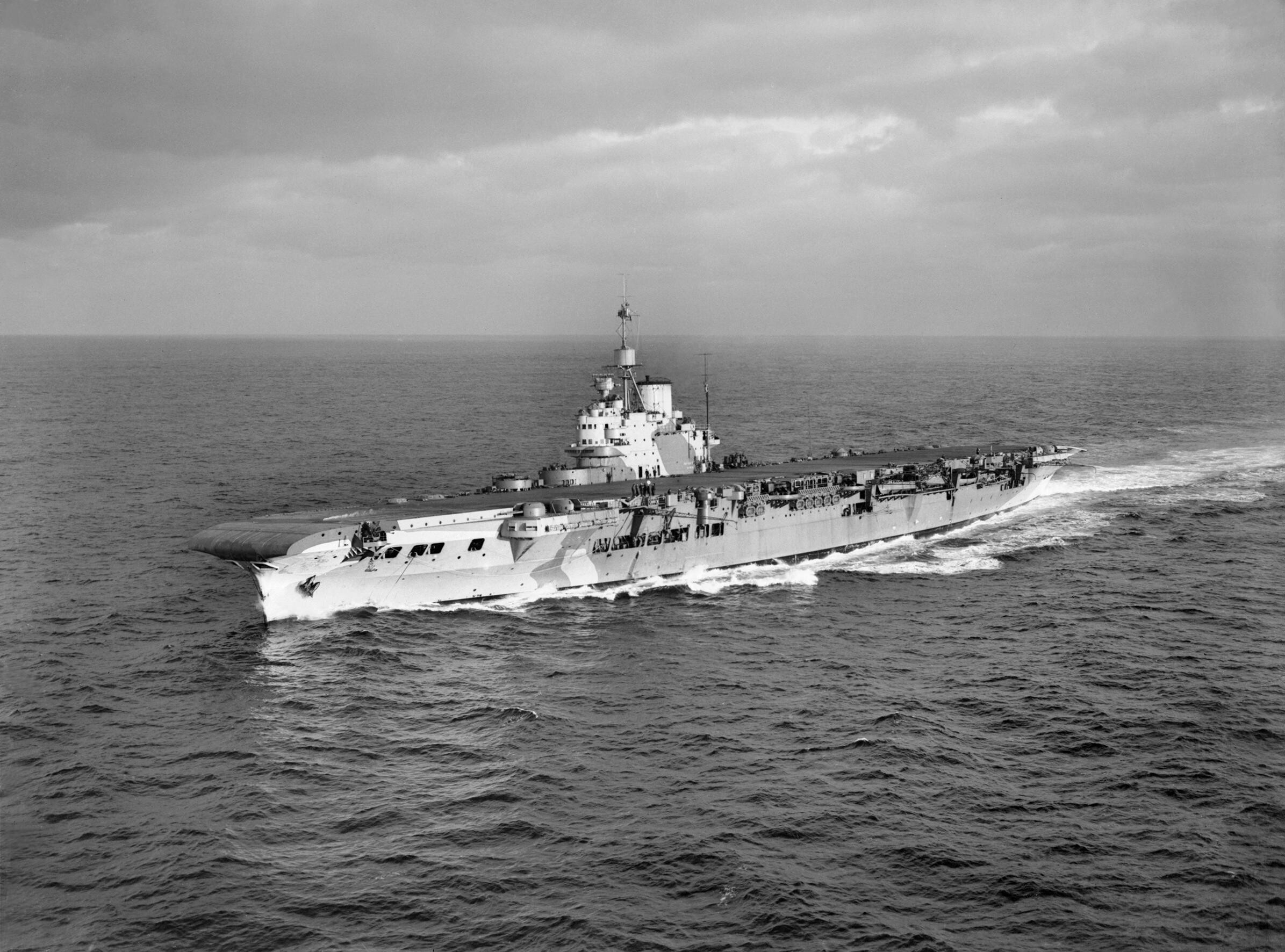
HMS Victorious

1943 - 1945

- Royal Naval Air Station Quonset Point (HMS Saker II), Rhode Island, (15 July - 27 August 1943)
- RN Air Section Brunswick, Maine, (27 August - 31 October 1943)
  - RN Air Section Norfolk, Virginia, (Detachment Deck Landing Training (DLT) USS Charger 14 - 17 October 1943)p
- RN Air Section Norfolk, Virginia, (transit) (31 October - 1 November 1943)
- HMS Khedive (1 - 16 November 1943)
- Royal Naval Air Station Maydown, County Londonderry, (16 - 19 November 1943)
- RN Air Section Speke, Merseyside, (19 - 22 November 1943)
- Royal Naval Air Station Maydown, County Londonderry, (22 November - 20 December 1943)
- Royal Naval Air Station Stretton (HMS Blackcap), Cheshire, (20 December 1943 - 1 February 1944)
- Royal Naval Air Station Machrihanish (HMS Landrail), Argyll and Bute, (1 - 7 February 1944)
- HMS Ravager DLT (7 - 11 February 1944)
- Royal Naval Air Station Machrihanish (HMS Landrail), Argyll and Bute, (11 - 12 February 1944)
- HMS Victorious (12 - 15 February 1944)
- Royal Naval Air Station Machrihanish (HMS Landrail), Argyll and Bute, (15 February - 8 March 1944)
- HMS Victorious (8 - 20 March 1944)
- Royal Naval Air Station Machrihanish (HMS Landrail), Argyll and Bute, (20 - 24 March 1944)
- Royal Naval Air Station Grimsetter (HMS Robin), Mainland, Orkney, (24 - 30 March 1944)
- HMS Victorious (30 March - 7 July 1944)
- Royal Naval Air Station Colombo Racecourse (HMS Berhunda), Ceylon, (7 - 19 July 1944)
- HMS Victorious (19 - 27 July 1944)
- RN Air Section Minneriya, Ceylon, (27 July - 10 August 1944)
- HMS Victorious (10 - 28 August 1944)
- Royal Naval Air Station Colombo Racecourse (HMS Berhunda), Ceylon, (28 August - 14 September 1944)
- HMS Victorious (14 - 25 September 1944)
- Royal Naval Air Station Puttalam (HMS Rajaliya), Ceylon, (25 September - 11 October 1944)
- HMS Victorious 11.10.44
- Royal Naval Air Station Colombo Racecourse (HMS Berhunda), Ceylon, (28 October - 19 December 1944)
- HMS Victorious (19 December 1944 - 10 February 1945)
- Royal Naval Air Station Nowra (HMS Nabbington), New South Wales, (10 - 27 February 1945)
- HMS Victorious (27 February - 5 June 1945)
- Royal Naval Air Station Schofields (HMS Nabthorpe), New South Wales, (5 - 26 June 1945)
- HMS Victorious (26 June - 23 August 1945)
- Royal Naval Air Station Bankstown (HMS Nabberley), New South Wales, / Royal Naval Air Station Maryborough (HMS Nabstock), Queensland, (23 August - 25 September 1945)
- HMS Victorious (crews) (25 September - 31 October 1945)
- disbanded UK - (31 October 1945)

1953 - 1955

- Royal Air Force Benson, Oxfordshire, (10 October 1953 - 16 January 1954)
- Royal Naval Air Station Yeovilton (HMS Heron), Somerset, (16 January 1954 - 30 April 1955)
- disbanded - (30 April 1955)

== Commanding officers ==
List of commanding officers of 1834 Naval Air Squadron with date of appointment:

Note: Abbreviation (A) signifies Air Branch of the RN or RNVR.

1943 - 1945

- Lieutenant Commander(A) A.M. Tritton, DSC, RNVR, from 15 July 1943
- Lieutenant Commander(A) P.N. Charlton, DFC, RN, from 23 December 1943
- Lieutenant Commander(A) R.D.B. Hopkins, RN, from 10 October 1944
- Lieutenant Commander J.G. Baldwin, DSC, RN, from 26 April 1945
- Lieutenant Commander(A) D.A. Dick, RNVR, from 10 September 1945
- disbanded - 31 October 1945

1953 - 1955

- Lieutenant Commander(A) A.C.B. Ford, DSC, VRD RNVR, from 10 October 1953
- disbanded - 30 April 1955
