= 1836 Naval Air Squadron =

Inactive Royal Navy Fleet Air Arm and Reserve Air Squadron

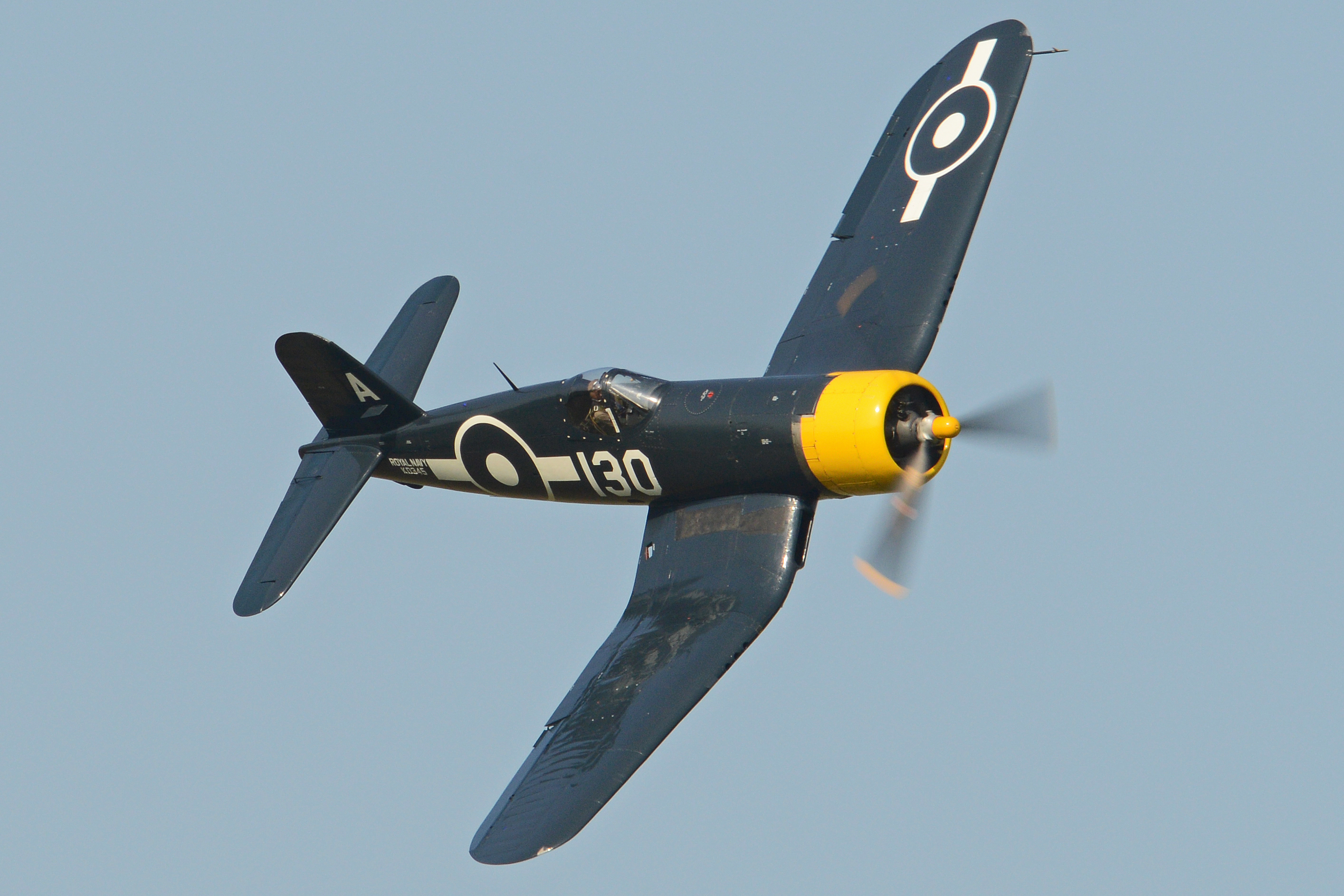
- Vought Corsair; an example of the type used by 1836 NAS
- Active: 1943–1945; 1953–1957
- Disbanded: 10 March 1957
- Country: United Kingdom
- Branch: Royal Navy
- Type: Single-seat fighter squadron; Royal Naval Volunteer Reserve Air Squadron
- Role: Carrier-based fighter squadron
- Size: ten / fourteen aircraft (1943-45); Shared aircraft pool (RNVR)
- Part of: Fleet Air Arm
- Home station: See Naval air stations section for full list.
- Engagements: World War II: European theatre of World War II; Operation Tungsten; Operation Lombard; Pacific War; Operation Crimson; Operation Banquet; Operation Light; Operation Millet; Operation Lentil; Operation Meridian; Operation Iceberg; Air raids on Japan
- Battle honours: Norway 1944; Sabang 1944; East Indies 1944-45; Palembang 1945; Okinawa 1945; Japan 1945

Insignia
- Identification Markings: 3A+; 8A+ (by April 1944); T8A+ (January 1945); 131-150 (March 1945)
- Fin Carrier Code: P (March 1945)

Aircraft flown
- Fighter: Vought Corsair

1836 Naval Air Squadron (1836 NAS) was a Fleet Air Arm (FAA) naval air squadron of the United Kingdom's Royal Navy (RN). It was established at HMS Saker II, RNAS Quonset Point, in August 1943, with Vought Corsair aircraft as a single-seat fighter squadron. The squadron joined HMS Atheling in December, arriving HMS Gadwall, RNAS Belfast, in January 1944, and then moved to HMS Ringtail, HMS Burscough, the next day. It became part of the 47th Naval Fighter Wing, before joining the carrier HMS Victorious in March. After providing air support for attacks on the battleship Tirpitz in April, the squadron sailed with the carrier to the Far East in June, landing at HMS Berhunda, RNAS Colombo Racecourse in early July. From July 1944 to January 1945, the squadron supported operations against Sumatra, then joined the British Pacific Fleet for missions against the Sakishima Gunto from March to May 1945. As part of the 1st Carrier Air Group, the squadron participated in operations targeting the Tokyo area before the ship returned to Australia after the war. After the war, the squadron left its aircraft at HMS Nabbington, RNAS Nowra, near Sydney, and returned home on the carrier, disbanding upon arrival at the end of October. It reformed as a Royal Naval Volunteer Reserve Air Branch fighter squadron, in the Southern Air Division, from 1953 and disbanded in 1957.

== History ==
=== Single-seat fighter squadron (1943-1945) ===
The personnel of 1836 Naval Air Squadron gathered at HMS Waxwing, which served as the Fleet Air Arm Transit Camp, Royal Naval Air Establishment (RNAE) Townhill, Dunfermline, Fife, on 1 July 1943 for passage to the USA. The squadron was officially established on 15 August at RNAS Quonset Point (HMS Saker II), which was the United States Naval Air Station Quonset Point, located in Rhode Island. The Admiralty gained access to this station starting in October 1943. It was organised as a single-seat fighter unit under the command of Lieutenant Commander(A) C.C. Tomkinson, RNVR, and was initially equipped with ten Vought Corsair fighter aircraft, these were the Vought Chance built F4U-1 and known as the Corsair Mk I in the Fleet Air Arm.

Following the initial familiarisation phase, the flying training encompassed a variety of exercises, including navigation drills, low-altitude manoeuvres, formation flying, and combat tactics. Additionally, training included Aerodrome Dummy Deck Landing (ADDL) and night flying operations. On 1 September, the squadron relocated to the RN Air Section at US Naval Air Station Brunswick in Maine to further advance their training regimen. At the beginning of November, the squadron commenced the acquisition of Corsair Mk II aircraft, resulting in an increase of their total inventory to eighteen aircraft, these were the Vought Chance built F4U-1A variant of the fighter aircraft.

Upon concluding operations at USNAS Brunswick, the squadron proceeded to embark aboard the Ruler-class escort carrier, HMS Atheling on 18 December. The carrier departed for Brooklyn, New York, on 22. Subsequently, HMS Atheling left New York on 29, participating with the rapid convoy UT.6, which comprised twenty-four ships. On 9 January 1944, the carrier disembarked 1836 Naval Air Squadron to RNAS Belfast (HMS Gadwall) in Belfast, Northern Ireland. The squadron's aircraft took off from Belfast the next day, proceeding to RNAS Burscough (HMS Ringtail) in Lancashire, England.

The squadron was integrated into the newly established 47th Naval Fighter Wing (47 Wing), alongside 1834 Naval Air Squadron, under the command of Lieutenant Commander F.R.A. Turnbull, DSC, RN. The squadron quickly resumed its training, departing for RNAS Stretton (HMS Blackcap), Cheshire, on 3 February. At this point, the number of operational aircraft was decreased to fourteen, prior to the squadron's relocation to RNAS Machrihanish (HMS Landrail), Argyll and Bute, Scotland, on 14 February. This move was part of their ongoing preparations to embark in the Fleet Carrier HMS Victorious in March. She was subsequently assigned to take part in a number of planned attacks, including Operation Tungsten, a Fleet Air Arm assault, targeting the German battleship Tirpitz, which was stationed at her base in Kåfjorden, located in the remote northern region of Norway.

In June, HMS Victorious departed from the UK, destined for Ceylon. The carrier reached Ceylon the following month, at which point the Vought Corsair aircraft belonging to 47 Wing were disembarked to RNAS Colombo Racecourse (HMS Berhunda), Colombo, Ceylon, on 7 July. Operations were conducted by the squadron and wing from July 1944 to January 1945. Operation Crimson involved assaults on airfields located near Sabang, Sumatra. Operation Banquet consisted of a series of attacks targeting the Padang airfield, Emmehaven harbor, and the Indaroeng Cement Works in Padang. Operation Light was a bifurcated initiative aimed at executing air strikes on Japanese forces in Sigli, Northern Sumatra, as well as conducting aerial reconnaissance over the Nicobar Islands. Operation Millet entailed naval bombardments and aerial assaults on Japanese installations in the Nicobar Islands from 17 to 20 October.

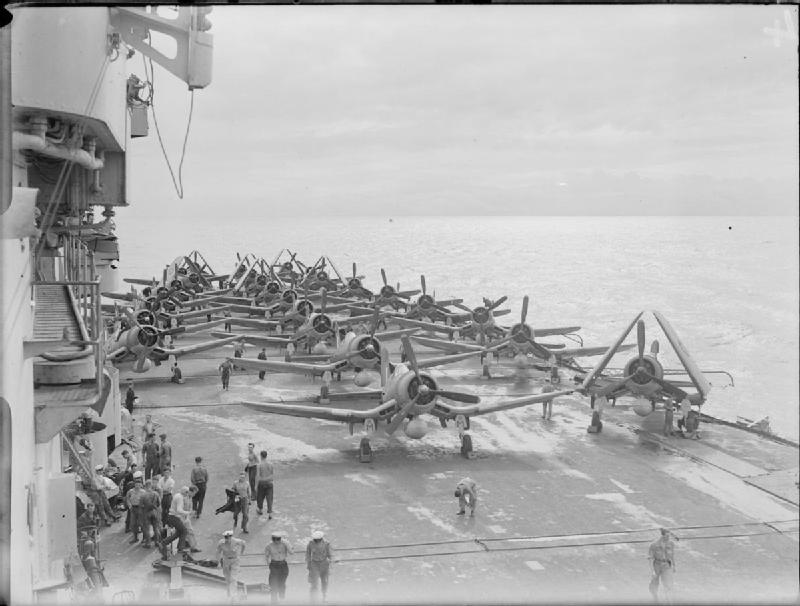
1836 Naval Air Squadron ranged ready for attack on the carrier's flight deck on board HMS Victorious

On 22 November, HMS Victorious along with her squadrons was reassigned to the newly established British Pacific Fleet (BPF). Operation Lentil followed, focusing on striking the oil refineries situated in Pangkalan Brandan, Northern Sumatra. Next was Operation Meridian which targeted Japanese oil resources in the Palembang region of southern Sumatra. Operation Iceberg subsequently commenced, aimed at neutralising six airfields located within the Sakishima Gunto.

On June 30, the 47th Naval Fighter Wing was officially disbanded as the Admiralty transitioned to the United States model of Carrier Air Groups. In this new structure, all squadrons assigned to a carrier were organised into a Carrier Air Group (CAG). HMS Victorious was designated as No. 1 CAG, which included 1834, 1836, and 849 Naval Air Squadrons, commanded by Commander J.C.N. Shrubsole, RN. The squadron was re-equipped with a new variant of the Vought Corsair, specifically the FG-1D model produced by Goodyear, which was designated as the Corsair Mk IV by the Fleet Air Arm.

The squadron participated in operations targeting mainland Japan, with a particular emphasis on objectives located in the Tokyo region. Following Victory over Japan Day, the carrier proceeded to Australia. In the post-war period, the squadron left its aircraft at RNAS Nowra (HMS Nabbington), situated near Sydney, Australia, before returning to the United Kingdom aboard the carrier, ultimately disbanding upon arrival on 31 October 1945.

== Royal Naval Volunteer Reserve Air Squadron ==
=== Fighter squadron ===
On 28 March 1953, 1836 Naval Air Squadron reformed at RNAS Culham (HMS Hornbill), Oxfordshire, England, as a Royal Naval Volunteer Reserve fighter squadron in the Southern Air Division, under the command of Lieutenant Commander(A) T.O. Adkin, RNVR. It was essentially a renaming of 1832B Naval Air Squadron. The squadron shared a pool of aircraft with 1832 and 1835 Naval Air Squadrons. The RNVR squadron disbanded on 10 March 1957 under the White Paper defence cuts of that year.

== Aircraft flown ==
1836 Naval Air Squadron flew different variants of only one aircraft type:

- Vought Corsair Mk I fighter aircraft (August - November 1943)
- Vought Corsair Mk II fighter aircraft (November 1943 - October 1945)
- Vought Corsair Mk IV fighter aircraft (April - October 1945)

== Battle honours ==
The Battle Honours awarded to 1836 Naval Air Squadron are:

- Norway 1944
- Sabang 1944
- East Indies 1944-45
- Palembang 1945
- Okinawa 1945
- Japan 1945

== Assignments ==
1836 Naval Air Squadron was assigned as needed to form part of a number of larger units:

- 47th Naval Fighter Wing (17 January 1944 - 30 June 1945)
- 1st Carrier Air Group (30 June - 8 September 1945)

== Naval air stations ==
1836 Naval Air Squadron operated mostly from a number of naval air stations of the Royal Navy in the UK and overseas, a Royal Navy fleet carrier and an escort carrier:

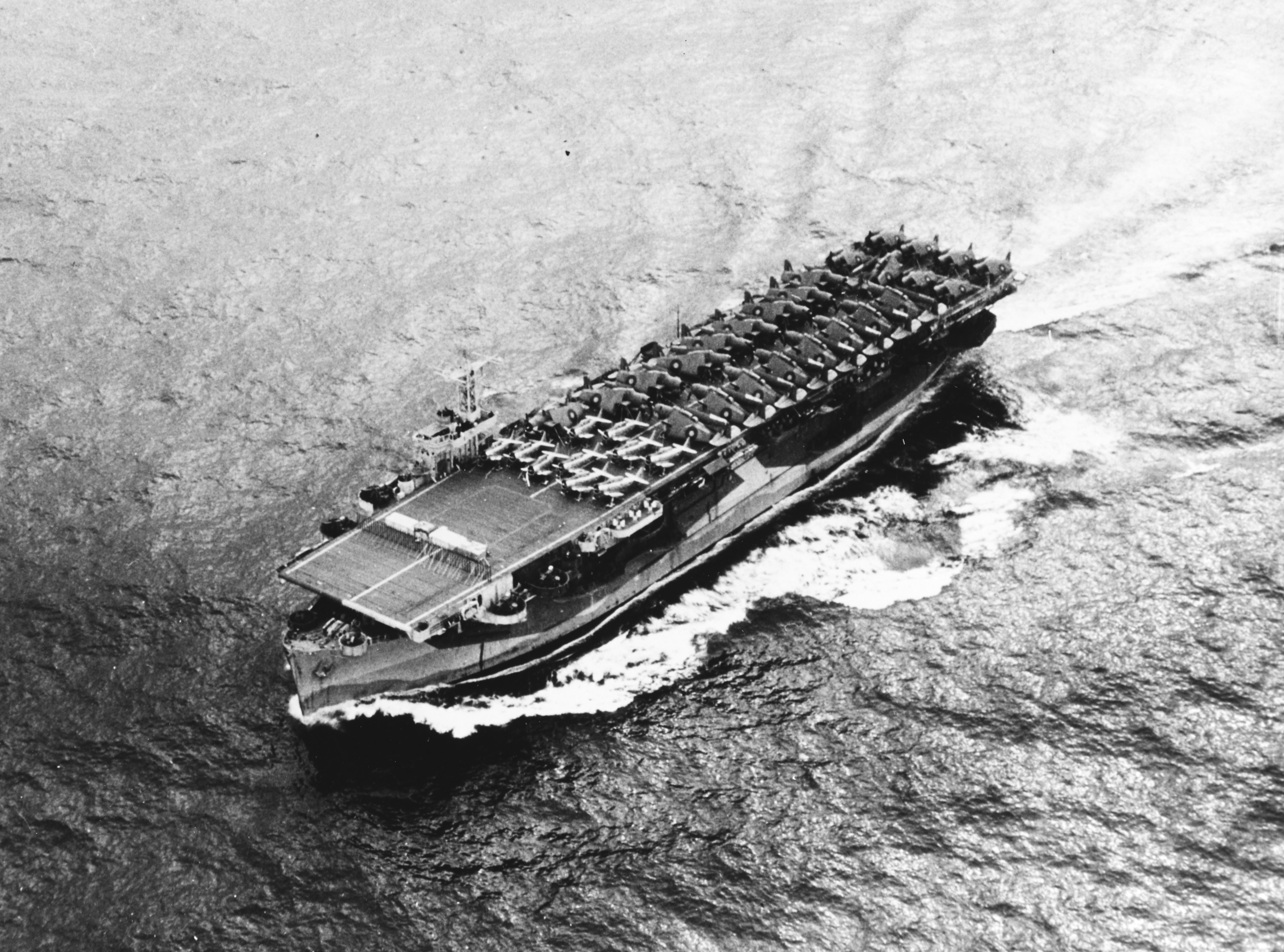
HMS Atheling underway on 22 December 1943

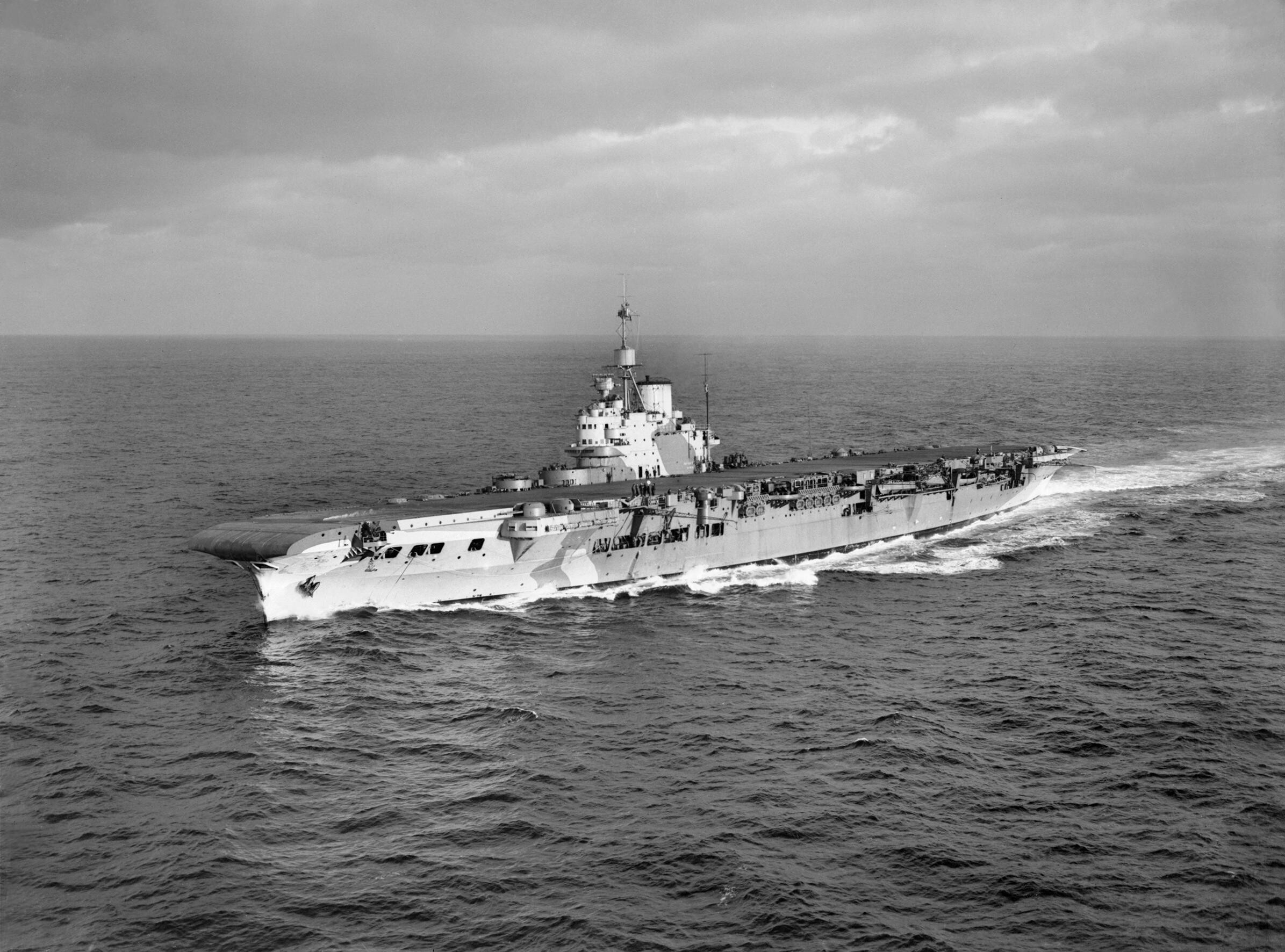
HMS Victorious

1943 - 1945

- Royal Naval Air Station Quonset Point (HMS Saker II), Rhode Island, (15 August - 1 September 1943)
- RN Air Section Brunswick, Maine, (1 September - 18 December 1943)
- RN Air Section Norfolk, Virginia, (Detachment Deck Landing Training (DLT) USS Charger) (12 - 17 November 1943)
- HMS Atheling (18 December 1943 - 10 January 1944)
- Royal Naval Air Station Burscough (HMS Ringtail), Lancashire, (10 January - 3 February 1944)
- Royal Naval Air Station Stretton (HMS Blackcap), Cheshire, (3 - 14 February 1944)
- Royal Naval Air Station Machrihanish (HMS Landrail), Argyll and Bute, (14 February - 8 March 1944)
- HMS Victorious (8 March - 7 July 1944)
- RN Air Section Minneriya, Ceylon, (7 - 19 July 1944)
- HMS Victorious (19 - 27 July 1944)
- RN Air Section Minneriya, Ceylon, (27 July - 4 August 1944)
- HMS Victorious (4 - 28 August 1944)
- Royal Naval Air Station Colombo Racecourse (HMS Berhunda), Ceylon, (28 August - 14 September 1944)
- HMS Victorious (14 - 25 September 1944)
- Royal Naval Air Station Colombo Racecourse (HMS Berhunda), Ceylon, (25 September - 11 October 1944)
- HMS Victorious (11 - 23 October 1944)
- Royal Naval Air Station Colombo Racecourse (HMS Berhunda) Ceylon, (23 October - 10 November 1944)
- Royal Naval Air Station Puttalam (HMS Rajaliya), Ceylon, (10 - 17 November 1944)
- Royal Naval Air Station Colombo Racecourse (HMS Berhunda), Ceylon, (17 November - 20 December 1944)
- HMS Victorious (20 December 1944 - 10 February 1945)
- Royal Naval Air Station Nowra (HMS Nabbington), New South Wales (10 - 27 February 1945)
- HMS Victorious (27 February - 5 June 1945)
- Royal Naval Air Station Schofields (HMS Nabthorpe), New South Wales (5 - 26 June 1945)
- HMS Victorious (26 June - 23 August 1945)
- Royal Naval Air Station Bankstown (HMS Nabberley), New South Wales / Royal Naval Air Station Maryborough (HMS Nabstock), Queensland (aircraft) / HMS Victorious (crews) (23 August - 31 October 1945)
- disbanded UK - (31 October 1945)

1953 - 1957

- Royal Naval Air Station Culham (HMS Hornbill), Oxfordshire, (ex-1832B Naval Air Squadron 28 March 1953 - 18 July 1953)
- Royal Air Force Benson, Oxfordshire, (18 July 1953 - 10 March 1957)
- disbanded - (10 March 1957)

== Commanding officers ==
List of commanding officers of 1836 Naval Air Squadron with date of appointment:

Note: Abbreviation (A) signifies Air Branch of the RN or RNVR.

1943 - 1945

- Lieutenant Commander(A) C.C. Tomkinson, RNVR, from 18 August 1943 (KiA 26 March 1945)
- Lieutenant Commander J.B. Edmundson, DSC, RN, from 27 March 1945 (KiA 20 May 1945)
- Sub Lieutenant(A) D.T. Chute RNVR, from 21 May 1945
- Lieutenant Commander(A) D.K. Evans, RNZNVR, from 14 June 1945
- Lieutenant(A) D.T. Chute, RNVR, from 27 August 1945
- disbanded - 31 October 1945

1953 - 1957

- Lieutenant Commander(A) T.O. Adkin, RNVR, from 28 March 1953
- Lieutenant Commander(A) W.L.E. Brewer, RNVR, from 23 July 1956
- disbanded - 10 March 1957
