= Ronald Cuthbert Hay =

Flying Ace and Royal Navy Commander 1916-2001

- Ronald Cuthbert Hay
- Born: 4 October 1916; Perth, Scotland
- Died: 22 November 2001 (aged 85); Wiltshire, England
- Military career
- Allegiance: United Kingdom
- Branch: Royal Marines (1935–51); Royal Navy (1951–66)
- Service years: 1935–1966
- Rank: Commander
- Nickname: Ronnie
- Unit: Fleet Air Arm
- Commands: 809 Naval Air Squadron; 47th Naval Fighter Wing
- Conflicts: Second World War: Norwegian campaign; Dunkirk evacuation; Battle of Britain
- Awards: Distinguished Service Order; Distinguished Service Cross & Bar

Ronald Cuthbert Hay, DSO, DSC & Bar (4 October 1916 – 22 November 2001) was a British naval aviator and the only Royal Marine fighter ace. He joined the Royal Marines in 1935 and then served as an aviator with the Fleet Air Arm. In 1940 he joined 801 Naval Air Squadron flying the two seater Blackburn Skua on HMS Ark Royal for the Norwegian campaign, claiming his first victory on his first operational flight. He took part in operations covering the evacuation of the British Expeditionary Force from the Dunkirk beaches. Flying the Fairey Fulmar, he joined 808 Naval Air Squadron during the Battle of Britain.

In 1944 Hay became wing leader of the 47th Naval Fighter Wing, flying the Vought F4U Corsair aboard HMS Victorious in the Far East. He led the wing during many of the major British air attacks on the Japanese in Sumatra. By the end of the war he had claimed four aircraft destroyed solo and nine shared destroyed. After the war he transferred to the Royal Navy, reaching the rank of commander before retiring in 1966.

== Early life ==
Ronald Cuthbert Hay was born on 4 October 1916, in Perth, Scotland, one of five children (three girls and two boys) of Captain Cuthbert Joseph Hay and Letitia Griffith Fausset. He was educated at Ampleforth College in Yorkshire.

== Second World War ==
Too old for a cadetship in the Royal Navy, Hay volunteered for the Royal Marines in 1935, and served a year at sea in the cruiser HMS Devonshire. In 1938 he volunteered for flying duties with the Fleet Air Arm and was posted to the recently reformed 801 Naval Air Squadron, assigned to the fleet carrier HMS Ark Royal and equipped with the two seater Blackburn Skua and Blackburn Roc fighter aircraft. His first victory during operations over Norway was on 27 April 1940, which he later described in detail:

We ran into a Heinkel He 111 bomber, Lieutenant Bill Church attacked from astern and the bomber dived to sea level. They exchanged fire, and when Bill pulled upwards to break off the attack, his aircraft was struck in the belly and crashed into the sea without any survivors. I had learned my first lesson in air fighting with a vengeance-never break away upwards. I therefore sat on the tail of the bomber and fired short bursts until it crashed into the sea.

On 31 May 801 Squadron joined 806 Naval Air Squadron at Detling to cover the evacuation of the British Expeditionary Force from the beaches at Dunkirk. They mainly used the Skua in its dive bomber role, which was no match for the German Messerschmitt Bf 109s. After one mission Hay's plane was only one of four that returned to base, the rest having been shot down. The squadron remained in Kent until 27 June. Hay was next transferred to the Fairey Fulmar equipped 808 Naval Air Squadron based at Wick, West Sussex. The squadron was one of only two Fleet Air Arm fighter squadrons that fought in the Battle of Britain under RAF Fighter Command control.

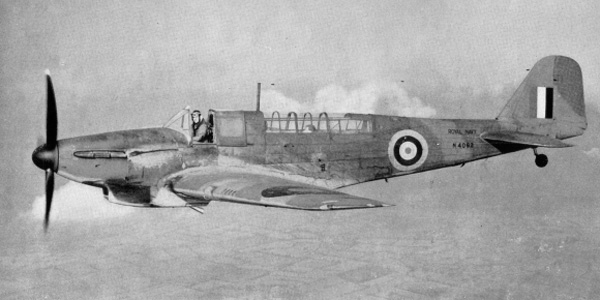
Fairey Fulmar two seater fighter

In October 1940, 808 Squadron and Hay rejoined the Ark Royal en route to the Mediterranean. Hay remained on active service through early 1941, claiming several Italian floatplanes. In May 1941 they escorted the Tiger convoy from Gibraltar to Egypt. As they approached Sardinia on 8 May they twice came under attack from the Italian Air Force. During the second attack Hay who was leading his section of aircraft shot down a Savoia-Marchetti SM.79 his sixth confirmed victory. After Ark Royal was torpedoed and sunk in November 1941, Hay was posted ashore as a flying instructor with 759 and 761 training Squadrons. He was also awarded a Distinguished Service Cross (DSC) for his exploits while in the Mediterranean.

Promoted to acting captain in May 1942, he was given command of 809 Naval Air Squadron, which was assigned to the fleet carrier HMS Victorious. Hay commanded the squadron during the Torch landings in North Africa and was promoted to substantive captain at the same time. Hay's time in command of 809 Squadron did not last long as he was soon posted to Ceylon as an acting major in April 1943. It was while in Ceylon that he met and married Third Officer Barbara Grange, of the Women's Royal Naval Service.

=== Far East ===
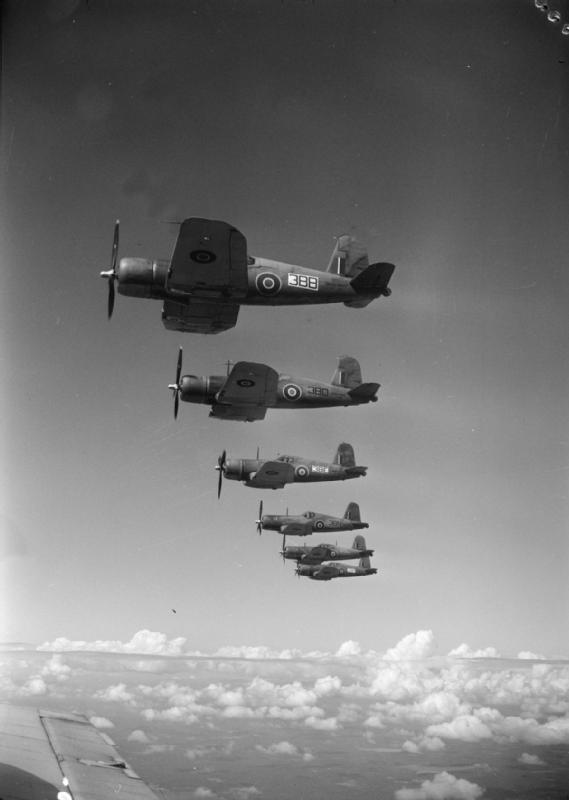
Fleet Air Arm Corsairs

In August 1944 Hay took over command of the 47th Naval Fighter Wing, which was composed of two squadrons of Vought F4U Corsairs aboard HMS Victorious. (Note: The two squadrons were the 1834 and 1836 Naval Air squadrons.) Their first operation was against the Nicobar Islands in October 1944.

He was promoted acting lieutenant colonel in December 1944. That month the four fleet carriers, Victorious, Illustrious, Indomitable and Indefatigable, were designated the 1st Aircraft Carrier Squadron, under Admiral Philip Vian.

On 4 January 1945, Hay led Operation Meridian – a major air raid on oil refineries and airfields around Palembang in Sumatra – for which he was awarded the Distinguished Service Order. This was to be one of the Fleet Air Arm's largest ever operations, involving 56 Corsairs and 45 Grumman Avengers from Victorious and HMS Illustrious. During Meridian, Hay's fighters shot down eight Japanese aircraft for the loss of one Corsair. These included two aircraft shot down by Hay himself; a Nakajima Ki-43 and a Nakajima Ki-44.

At the end of January, Hay's wing was again involved in operations to destroy the Sumatran oilfields. Hay claimed another victory on 29 January, when acting as the strike co-ordinator he shared in shooting down a Nakajima Ki-43 and a Nakajima Ki-44. Hay's wing was next involved in operations at the Sakishima Islands between March and June 1945, in support of the American invasion of Okinawa. Hay was awarded a Bar to his DSC for his service leading these attacks. At the end of the Second World War Hay, still on board Victorious, was involved in air strikes against the Japanese mainland until 11 August 1945 when Victorious was withdrawn to Sydney for a refit.

== Later life ==
After the war, Hay continued flying but was injured in an accident while landing a Supermarine Seafire. He reverted to his war substantive rank of captain and was posted back to the Royal Marines. He then served with 40 Commando in Malta, Cyprus, Hong Kong and Malaya. Unhappy with the Royal Marines, Hay applied for, and was transferred to, the Royal Navy in 1951, with the rank of lieutenant commander. Hay served on the fleet carrier HMS Indomitable, then held a number of positions ashore. Between 1955 and 1957 he served at RNAS Stretton as commander (Air), followed by Staff College at Latimer, before going to Germany for his first NATO appointment. After this he returned to the Joint Warfare Establishment and then went to Turkey for another NATO position.

Hay retired from the Navy in 1966, and spent the next dozen years working in the Mediterranean chartering boats. He also spent time renovating an old mill at Amesbury, near Stonehenge. He appeared in several television documentaries about the Second World War.

Hay died in Wiltshire on 22 November 2001, aged 85, and was survived by his four children.

== Legacy ==
In May 2010 the Falkland Islands' Philatelic Bureau issued a set of stamps to commemorate the Battle of Britain. Lieutenant Hay's Fairey Fulmar was depicted to represent British aircraft that took part in the battle.

== Bibliography ==
- Cocker, Maurice (2008). Aircraft-Carrying Ships of the Royal Navy. Stroud, Gloucestershire: The History Press. ISBN 978-0-7524-4633-2.
- Styling, Mark (1995). Corsair Aces of World War 2. Osprey Aircraft of the Aces, Volume 8. Osprey Publishing. ISBN 978-1-85532-530-2.
- Tillamn, Barrett (2002). Corsair: The F4U in World War II and Korea. Annapolis, Maryland: Naval Institute Press. ISBN 1-55750-994-8.
- Thomas, Andrew (27 March 2007). Royal Navy Aces of World War 2. London: Osprey. ISBN 978-1-84603-178-6.
