= Emma Harbor =

Emma Harbor may refer to:

- Komsomolskaya Bay, a branch of Providence Bay, Chukotka, Siberia, Russia
- Emma Haven, now Teluk Bayur, a harbor serving Padang, West Sumatra, Indonesia
