= 1st Carrier Air Group =

Royal Navy Fleet Air Arm Carrier Air Group

- White Ensign
- Active: 30 June 1945 - 8 September 1945; October 1947 - May 1951
- Country: United Kingdom
- Branch: Royal Navy
- Type: Carrier Air Group
- Size: 2 x fighter squadron; 1 x TBR squadron
- Part of: Fleet Air Arm
- Formed for: Illustrious-class aircraft carrier
- Engagements: World War II: Pacific War; Air raids on Japan

Commanders
- Notable commanders: Commander Stanley Gordon Orr, DSC & Two Bars, AFC, RN

1st Carrier Air Group (1st CAG) was a Fleet Air Arm (FAA) carrier air group of the Royal Navy (RN). The establishment of the group occurred in June 1945, with the purpose of being deployed within the British Pacific Fleet. Nevertheless, it was dissolved later that same year, in September. The unit was allocated to the Illustrious-class aircraft carrier HMS Victorious.

The Group was re-established in October 1947, embarking in the lead ship of her class, HMS Implacable. In late 1950, the group was reassigned to the Illustrious-class aircraft carrier HMS Indomitable. The 1st Carrier Air Group was disbanded for the second time in May 1951.

== Naval air squadrons ==
1st Carrier Air Group consisted of a number of squadrons of the Fleet Air Arm.

Squadron	Aircraft	From	To
849 Naval Air Squadron	Grumman Avenger Mk.I, II	June 1945	September 1945
1834 Naval Air Squadron	Vought Corsair Mk II, IV	June 1945	September 1945
1836 Naval Air Squadron	Vought Corsair Mk II, IV	June 1945	September 1945
801 Naval Air Squadron	de Havilland Sea Hornet F.20	October 1947	May 1951
813 Naval Air Squadron	Blackburn Firebrand TF.5	October 1947	May 1951

== History ==
The squadrons of the Fleet Air Arm, embarked in the Royal Navy’s Fleet and Light Fleet aircraft carriers, were organised into Air Groups in alignment with United States Navy policy following the conclusion of World War II in Europe. This reorganisation aimed to facilitate operations in the Pacific Theater against Japanese forces in 1945. Carrier Air Groups one through six were assigned to the three Illustrious-class aircraft carriers. Each air group consisted of two squadrons of Vought Corsairs and one squadron of Grumman Avengers, with each squadron comprising fifteen aircraft.

=== 1945 ===
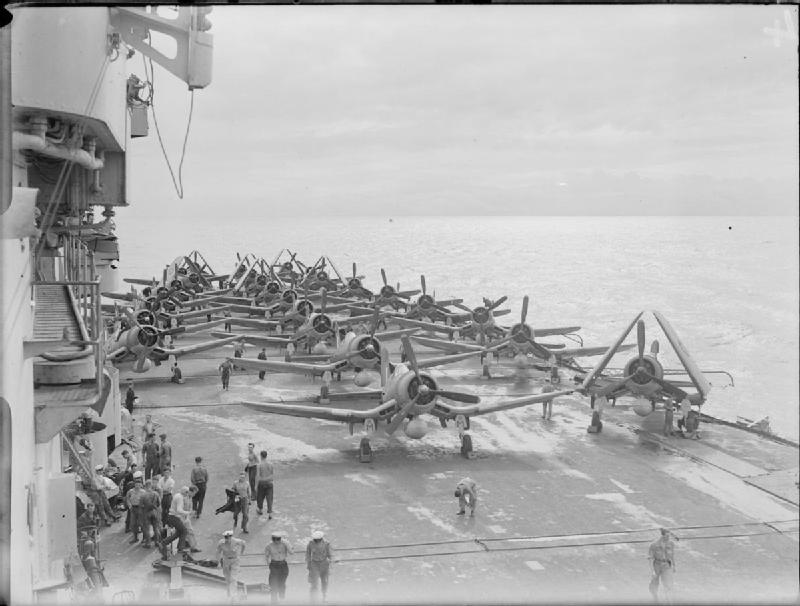
Vought F4U Corsair of 1834 Naval Air Squadron and 1836 Naval Air Squadron, fitted with extra petrol tanks and ranged ready for attack on the carrier's flight deck on board HMS Victorious

The 1st Carrier Air Group was formed on the 30 June 1945, for the Illustrious-class carrier, HMS Victorious, as part of the British Pacific Fleet. During July and August 1945, the latter part of the Second World War, it saw active service over Japan. The 1st Carrier Air Group consisted of 849 Naval Air Squadron, which operated the Grumman Avenger, an American torpedo bomber aircraft, along with 1834 and 1836 Naval Air Squadrons, which were both equipped with Vought Corsair, an American carrier-based fighter-bomber aircraft, the latter two squadrons previously made up the Fleet Air Arm's 47th Naval Fighter Wing which was absorbed into the 1st Carrier Air Group on its formation.

==== Mainland Japan strikes ====
The group embarked in HMS Victorious in July 1945 for airstrikes against the Japanese mainland, near Tokyo, up until Victory over Japan Day. Notably, an 849 Naval Air Squadron Grumman Avenger from HMS Victorious, located and scored the first bomb hit on the Japanese escort carrier Kaiyo, at Beppu Bay, in Kyūshū, on 24 July 1945, which resulted in severe damage that kept the ship out of the remainder of the war.

Series one of the airstrikes on Mainland Japan took place between 17 and 19 July.

Aircraft from the 1st Carrier Air Group participated in numerous sorties during this timeframe. On 17 July, the fourth airstrike consisted of sixteen Vought Corsairs from HMS Victorious; however, the mission was called off due to poor weather conditions in the target area. The fifth operation aimed at Niigata airfield involved twelve Vought Corsairs from the Air Group, each equipped with a 500lb bomb, under the command of Commander Shrubsole. This operation resulted in the destruction of one aircraft and the damage of five others. The seventh and final airstrike on 18 July, launched from the carrier, featured six Vought Corsairs targeting Naruto and Tachikawa, successfully destroying five aircraft and inflicting damage on five additional planes.

A replenishment and refuelling period, originally planned from 20 to 23 July, was advanced to 19 July due to poor weather conditions. The weather remained unsuitable for the resumption of flying operations until 24 July.

The second series of airstrikes on Mainland Japan occurred from July 24 to July 25.

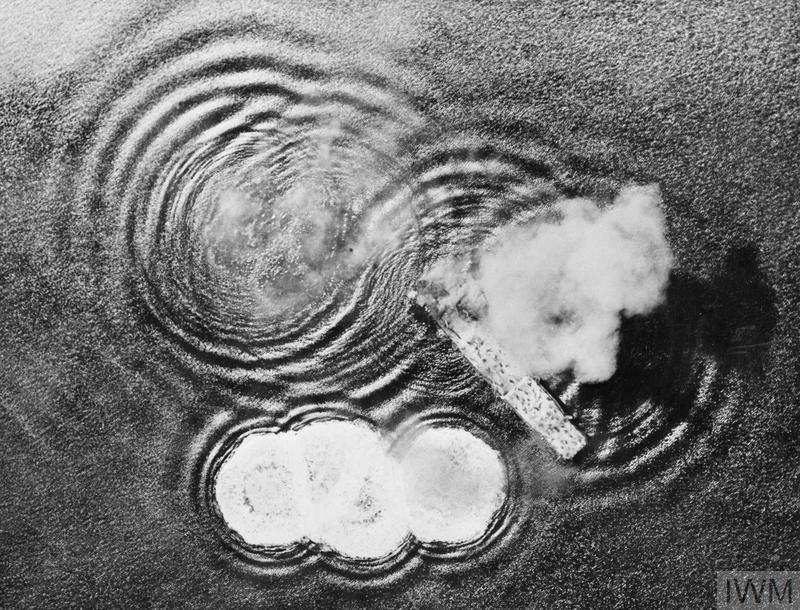
Shimane Maru under attack by Grumman Avenger aircraft from HMS Victorious, 24 July 1945

On 24 July airstrike 1C of series two comprised twelve Vought Corsairs from HMS Victorious, assigned to assault the airfield located at Takamatsu and Suta. Airstrike 2C was a Ramrod operation that involved eight Vought Corsairs from the Air Group, targeting sites in Kurashiki, the Fukuyama airfield, and Suta. Airstrike 3 denoted a subsequent combined operation under the command of Commander Shrubsole, the Air Group Leader of HMS Victorious, which aimed at shipping activities off the Shikoku coast, including the Japanese escort carrier Shimane Maru. This operation consisted of ten Grumman Avengers and four Vought Corsairs from HMS Victorious. Airstrike 4C was an anti-shipping sweep executed in the Inland Sea by twelve Vought Corsairs from the carrier.

Throughout the day’s Ramrod missions, the Vought Corsairs from HMS Victorious’ Air Group fired a total of 32,000 rounds at ground targets, setting a record for the carrier. The Vought Corsairs participating in airstrike 2C proceeded directly to Kurashiki airfield, where they encountered Flak during their approach. Bombs were released, resulting in damage to airfield structures and one Mitsubishi G4M "Betty" bomber aircraft. The next target was Okayama airfield, where one Yokosuka P1Y "Frances" bomber sustained damage, and the dispersal areas and revetments were strafed. At Fukuyama, one aircraft was also damaged. The formation then moved on to Suta airfield, inflicting damage on seven aircraft, and destroying one Kawanishi H6K "Mavis" through strafing. Notably, temporary Sub-lieutenant(A) P.C. Jupe, RNVR, who had not released his bombs, executed a flawless high dive attack on a concrete bridge north of Kōchi, achieving a direct hit.

On 25 July, airstrike 1C, consisting of twelve Vought Corsairs from HMS Victorious, was aborted due to poor weather conditions upon making landfall. Similarly, airstrike 2 was also aborted due to bad weather upon arrival. The fourth airstrike was a combined force, that included four Vought Corsairs from HMS Victorious, targeting Tokushima airfield. Airstrike 4C was a twelve Vought Corsair anti-shipping airstrike launched from HMS Victorious. An additional replenishment period occurred from 26 to 27 July.

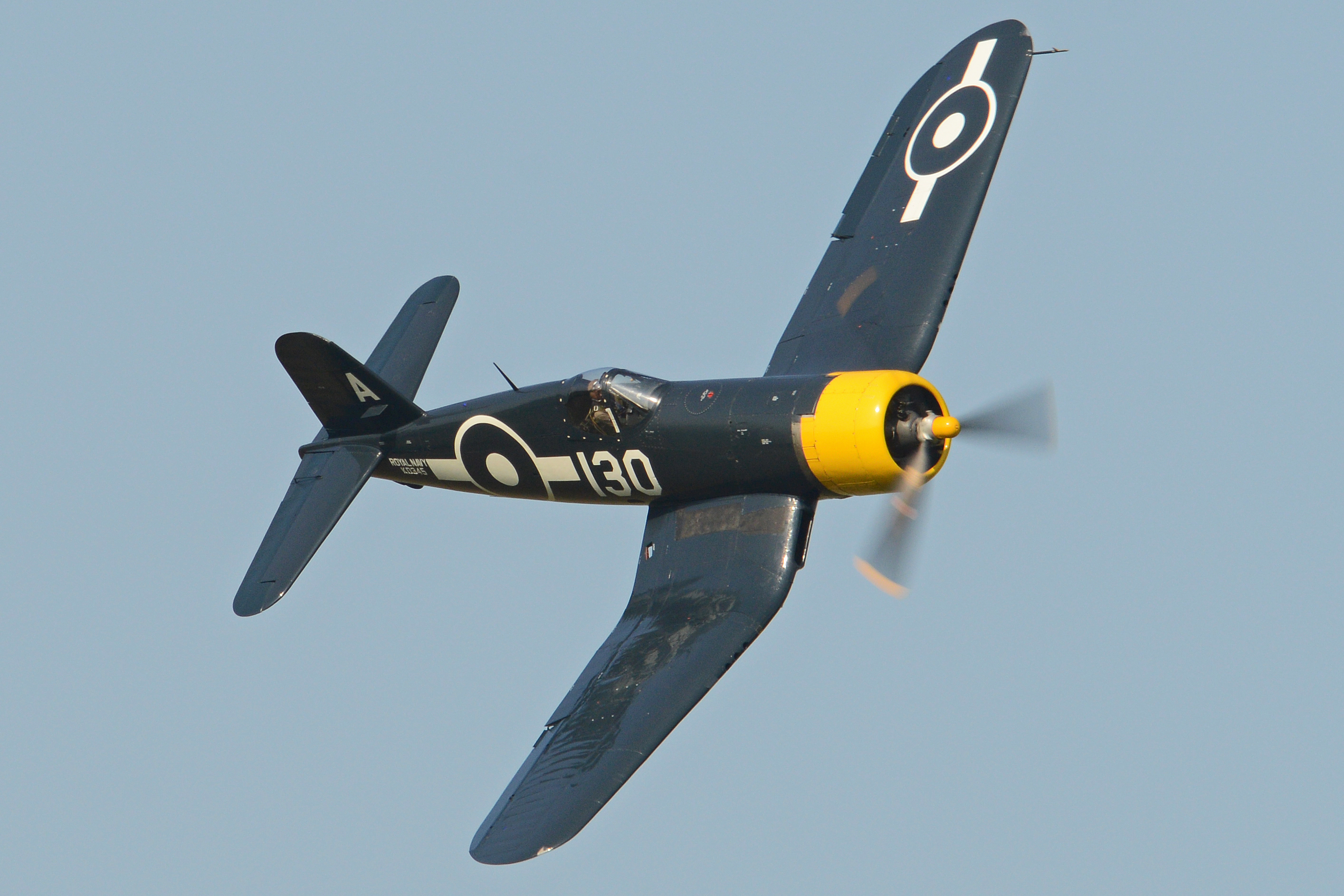
Vought Corsair; an example of the type used by 1834 & 1836 Squadrons

Series two airstrikes continued between 28 and 30 July. The combat air patrol (CAP) and first three Ramrod sorties were launched on 28 July. Airstrike 1C consisted of twelve Vought Corsairs launched from HMS Victorious to target shipping in the Inland Sea. Airstrike 2C was initiated from the Air Group, comprising an eight Vought Corsair mission aimed at Akashi airfield. Airstrike 4C included twelve Vought Corsairs from the carrier, directed towards targets at Sato and Fuge. On 29 July, there were no scheduled air operations; however, elements of Task Force 37 collaborated with the United States Navy's Task Force 38 to conduct bombardments on shore targets. Airstrike 1C involved eight Vought Corsairs from HMS Victorious, tasked with attacking shipping in Kumano harbour. Airstrike 2C was launched from HMS Victorious, consisting of an eight Vought Corsair mission targeting Akashi airfield.

Subsequently, a replenishment phase occurred from 31 July to 2 August. Bad weather conditions meant Series 3 of the airstrikes in mainland Japan had to be postponed. Originally scheduled for 5 August, the airstrikes were rescheduled to 8 August, necessitating an additional day for replenishment which occurred during 6 and 7 August.

The third wave of airstrikes on mainland Japan took place between August 8 and August 10.

On the morning of 9 August, Airstrike 1C consisted of ten Vought Corsairs from the Air Group, tasked with attacking coastal shipping off North Honshu. Airstrike 2C was launched from HMS Victorious, comprising eleven Vought Corsairs and also aimed at coastal shipping off North Honshu. Airstrike 4C included sixteen Vought Corsairs from the carrier targeting the Kōriyama airfield. The 10 August was designated as the final day for airstrikes before Task Force 37 was scheduled to withdraw to Australia for a maintenance and replenishment period. Airstrike 1C was made up of twelve Vought Corsairs from HMS Victorious, assigned to attack the Koriyama airfield. Airstrike 2C was launched by the Air Group, consisting of eight Vought Corsairs to target coastal shipping at Onagawa Wan. Replenishment took place on 11 August.

On 12 August, Task Force 37 was split and the majority of the British Pacific Fleet set sail for Manus Island, subsequently heading to Sydney. They were en route when the announcement of the Japanese surrender occurred on 15 August. Upon arriving at the Australian coast on 23 August, the 1st Carrier Air Group flew ashore, 1834 and 1836 Squadrons to HMS Nabstock, also known as MONAB VI and Royal Naval Air Station Maryborough, Queensland, where the Vought Corsairs were withdrawn. The Grumman Avengers of 849 squadron left for Mascot airfield in Sydney the following day.

The 1st Carrier Air Group was disbanded on HMS Victorious upon the group's return to the United Kingdom, on the 8 September 1945.

=== 1947–1951 ===
The 1st Carrier Air Group reformed in October 1947, for the name ship of her class, HMS Implacable. The 1st CAG was made up of 801 Naval Air Squadron, which operated the de Havilland Sea Hornet, twin engine, fighter aircraft, and 813 Naval Air Squadron, which was equipped with Blackburn Firebrand, a British single-engine strike fighter aircraft. On the 12 September 1950, the 1st CAG transferred to the Illustrious-class aircraft carrier, HMS Indomitable. The 1st Carrier Air Group disbanded on the 31 May 1951.

=== Aircraft carriers ===
Aircraft carriers which the 1st Carrier Air Group was assigned to:

- HMS Victorious (June - September 1945)
- HMS Implacable (October 1947 - September 1950)
- HMS Indomitable (September 1950 - May 1951)

=== Aircraft used ===
Aircraft used by the naval air squadrons that formed the 1st Carrier Air Group in 1945 and between 1947-51:

- Grumman Avenger, an American torpedo bomber
- Vought Corsair, an American fighter aircraft
- de Havilland Sea Hornet, a navalised version of the de Havilland Hornet for service on British aircraft carriers
- Blackburn Firebrand, a British single-engine strike fighter

== Air group commanders ==
List of commanding officers of the 1st Carrier Air Group, with date of appointment:

1945

- Commander J.C.N. Shrubsole, RN, from 30 June 1945
- disbanded - 8 September 1945

1947–1951

- Lieutenant Commander D.B. Law, MBE, DSC, RN, from 3 November 1948
- Lieutenant Commander S.G. Orr, DSC, AFC, RN, from 21 November 1949
- disbanded - 31 May 1951

== See also ==
- List of Fleet Air Arm groups
- List of aircraft carriers of the Royal Navy
- List of aircraft of the Fleet Air Arm
- List of Fleet Air Arm aircraft in World War II
