= Operation Crimson =

Naval operation of World War II

- Part of the Pacific Theatre of the Second World War
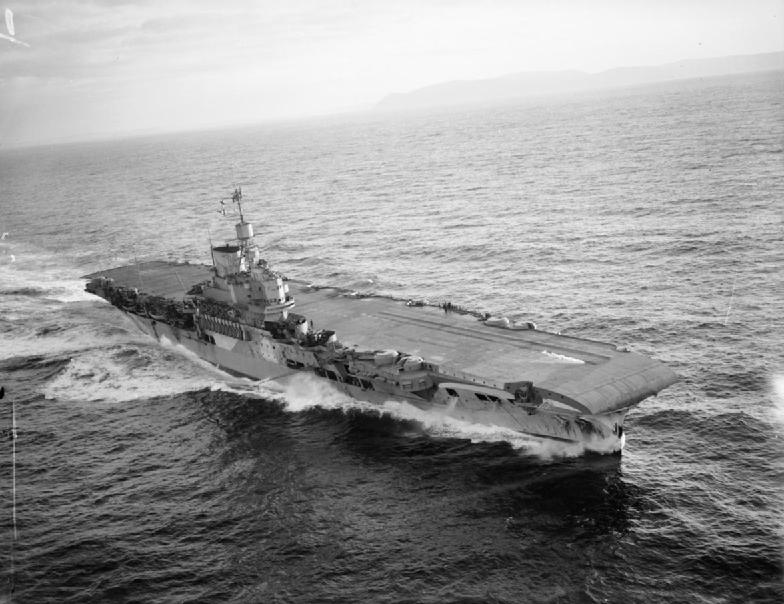
- HMS Victorious
Date	25 July 1944
Location	Dutch East Indies 02°00′00″S 118°00′00″E
Result	Inconclusive

Belligerents
United Kingdom; Australia; Netherlands; France	Japan

Commanders and leaders
(United Kingdom) James Somerville	(Empire of Japan) Moritake Tanabe

Strength
2 aircraft carriers; 3 battleships; 1 battlecruiser; 6 cruisers; 10 destroyers; 2 submarines; 34–39 fighters	Shore defences; 2 reconnaissance aircraft; 9–10 fighters

Casualties and losses
1 cruiser damaged; 2 destroyers damaged; 2 fighters destroyed	2 reconnaissance aircraft destroyed; 2 fighters destroyed; 2 fighters damaged
- Civilians: A war correspondent on an Allied ship was killed

Operation Crimson was an Allied naval operation in the Second World War of the Eastern Fleet, the objective being simultaneous naval bombardment and aircraft attacks on Japanese airfields in the Indonesian cities of Sabang, Lhoknga and Kutaraja, from aircraft carriers in the Indian Ocean on 25 July 1944.

British pilots found that the Japanese airmen were not as skilled as they had been in 1942 but lost two Corsair fighters. Crimson was the final event of Admiral James Somerville's command, before concerns about his health forced his transfer to diplomatic duty. The British task force did not launch another strike until Operation Banquet in August.

== Prelude ==
=== Plan ===
Unlike some earlier operations which had used small forces for harassment and diversion of the Japanese, Operation Crimson was "a full-blooded operation" designed to "make a mess of the air base and harbour installations and wreck any vessels found sheltering there".

=== Task Force 62 ===
Sailing from Trincomalee, under the command of Admiral James Somerville were the aircraft carriers HMS Victorious with 47 Naval Fighter Wing (Lieutenant-Commander F. R. A. Turnbull) 1834 Naval Air Squadron, 1836 Naval Air Squadron and 1838 Naval Air Squadron with thirty-nine Vought F4U Corsairs and Illustrious. The battleships HMS Queen Elizabeth, Valiant, Renown and Richelieu, the cruisers Ceylon, Cumberland, Gambia, Nigeria, Phoebe, the Dutch HNLMS Tromp and the destroyers HMS Quality, Quilliam, Racehorse, Raider, Rapid, Relentless, Rocket, Roebuck, Rotherham and HMAS Quickmatch, with the submarines HMS Templar and Tantalus.

== Operation ==
=== Air Attack ===
The aircraft carriers launched Corsair fighters. In spite of a five minute delay, it was too dark for the planes to accurately strafe the air fields, so instead they attacked large buildings in the vicinity. Japanese anti-air defences shot down a Corsair, whose pilot was rescued.

=== Naval bombardment ===
The battleships, aided by aircraft from Illustrious, bombarded Sabang harbour installations and the local barracks from afar. The cruisers and destroyers spotted their own targets; the former attacking a wireless station and responding shore batteries, while the latter focused on a radar station. Following the main bombardment, Tromp, Quality, Quickmatch, and Quilliam under Captain Richard Onslow entered Sabang harbour, shelling Japanese positions and launching torpedoes. Return fire from coastal artillery lightly damaged the ships, except for Quickmatch, causing some casualties and killing a war correspondent.

=== Japanese attack ===
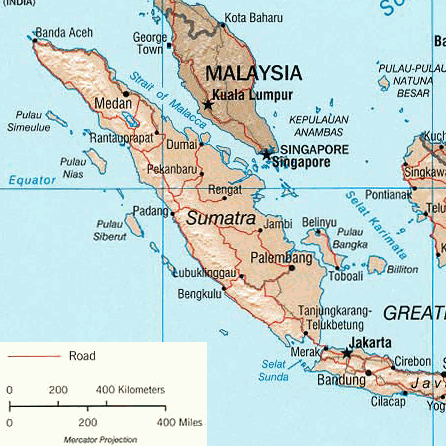
Map of Sumatra

As the task force withdrew, two Japanese reconnaissance aircraft tried to shadow it but both were intercepted and shot down. Later in the afternoon, 9 to 10 Japanese A6M Zero fighters approached the force. They were engaged by 13 Corsairs, that destroyed two Zeros and damaged two more.

== Aftermath ==
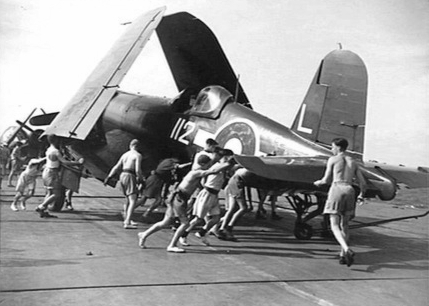
FAA Vought F4U Corsairs, of the type used in the attack.

The Allies lost two Corsairs during the operation. In a report of the raid,

The force arrived at flying off position in the early hours of Tuesday 25 July and at 4am the capital ships were detached to bombard Sambang along with Cumberland, Kenya and Nigeria. At 5.25 a.m. the two carriers launched their aircraft. The raid was a success with a great deal of damage done to the Japanese forces.

British pilots found that the Japanese airmen were not as skilled as they had been in 1942. Operation Crimson was the final event of Admiral Somerville's military command before concerns about his health forced his transfer to diplomatic duty. The British task force did not launch another strike until Operation Banquet in August.

== Bibliography ==
- Boniface, Patrick (2006). HMS Cumberland: A Classic British Cruiser in War and Peace. Penzance: Periscope Publishing. ISBN 978-1-904381-37-2.
- Hobbs, David (2012). The British Pacific Fleet: The Royal Navy's Most Powerful Strike Force (2nd ed.). Barnsley: Seaforth. ISBN 978-1-78346-922-2.
- Murfett, Malcolm H. (2008). Naval Warfare 1919–45: An Operational History of the Volatile War at Sea. London: Routledge. ISBN 978-1-134-04812-0.
- War with Japan: The South-East Asia Operations and Central Pacific Advance. Vol. IV. London: HMSO (Ministry of Defence Naval Historical Branch). 1995. ISBN 0-11-772820-9.
