= RNAS Stretton =

Former Royal Naval Air Station in Cheshire, England

RNAS Stretton HMS Blackcap
- Warrington, Cheshire in England
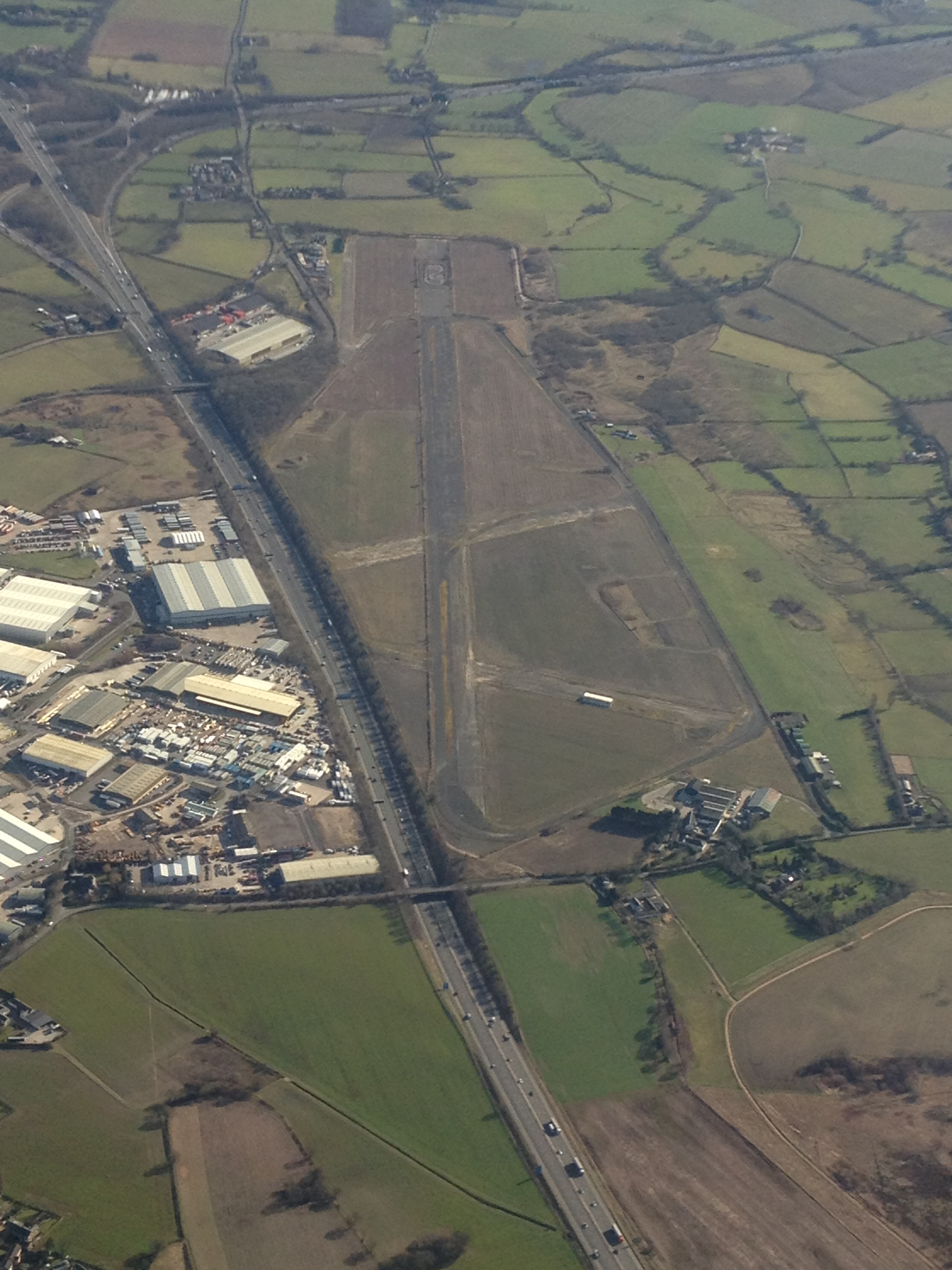
- The M56 now runs through former RNAS Stretton

Site information
- Type: Royal Naval Air Station
- Owner: Admiralty
- Operator: Royal Navy
- Controlled by: Fleet Air Arm
- Condition: Closed

Location
- Shown within Cheshire RNAS Stretton (the United Kingdom)
- Coordinates: 53°20′42″N 2°31′31″W

Site history
- Built: 1942
- In use: 1942-1958
- Fate: Farmland / Industry / Prison / Public road

Garrison information
- Garrison: Fleet Air Arm; Royal Naval Volunteer Reserve
- Occupants: No. 2 Ferry Flight; 1831 Squadron RNVR

Airfield information
- Elevation: 67 metres (220 ft) AMSL
Runways
Direction	Length and surface
02/20	1,024 metres (3,360 ft) Asphalt concrete
09/27	1,829 metres (6,001 ft) Asphalt concrete
15/33	1,024 metres (3,360 ft) Asphalt concrete

Royal Naval Air Station Stretton (RNAS Stretton, also known as HMS Blackcap), was a Naval Air Station situated in the village of Appleton Thorn, though named for the neighbouring village of Stretton, south of Warrington, in Cheshire, England. Although the main runway remains, the northerly part of the airfield is now HM Prison Thorn Cross, and an industrial estate. In the 1970s, the M56 motorway was built across the former air station.

The airfield was originally built in the Second World War for the Royal Air Force (RAF) but when the Luftwaffe tactics changed, it was surplus to requirements so command of the station was transferred to the Royal Navy in 1942. The airfield was used by the Royal Navy to ferry aircraft to aircraft carriers in the Irish Sea. Post war it was used as an aircraft maintenance, spares and disposal depot. After it was used by several RNAS squadrons and the Royal Naval Volunteer Reserve in the 1950s, the air station was closed in November 1958.

== Second World War ==
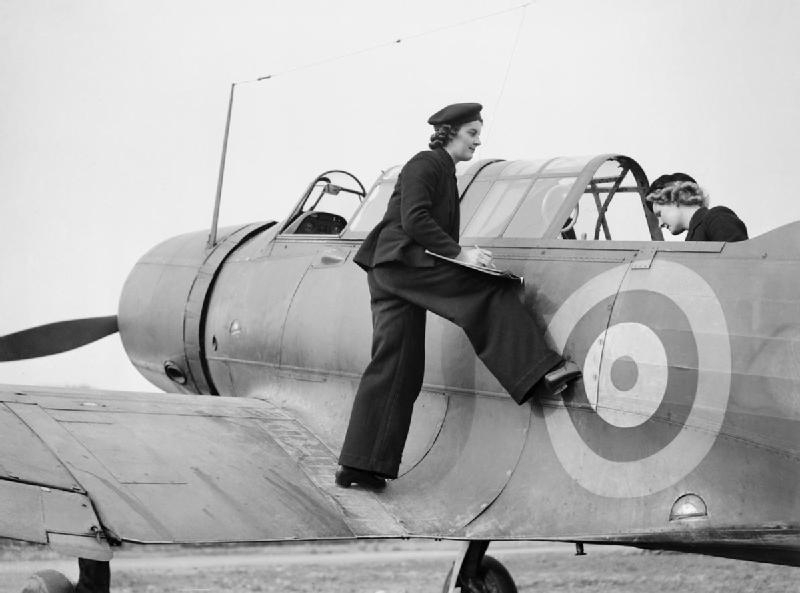
WRNS' checking a Vought Chesapeake at RNAS Stretton, 1943.

RNAS Stretton was originally planned as a Royal Air Force night-fighter station to protect Liverpool and Manchester from Luftwaffe air raids during the Second World War. But changes in German tactics meant that the airfield was not required, so it was transferred to the Admiralty on completion; three runways and numerous hangars had been built.

HMS Blackcap was commissioned on 1 June 1942 and forty-one Fleet Air Arm Squadrons were based there for varying periods, some aircraft being flown directly to and from aircraft carriers operating in the Irish Sea and other nearby waters.

Fairey Aviation used two large A1 (aircraft production) hangars on the northeast edge of the airfield for the modification, repair and flight-testing of Barracudas, Fireflies and Fulmars before they were dispatched to their operational squadrons. From 1944 HMS Blackcap was also used as an Aircraft Maintenance Yard, a large hangar complex being constructed to the northwest of the airfield for this activity.

On 31 May 1943 three WRNS ratings and three Naval Airmen were killed as the truck in which they were travelling lost control and overturned. The Wrens were returning to HMS Blackcap after a local dance. Five of the deceased were buried by their families in their home towns, WREN Anne McCormick, aged 29, was buried by the Royal Navy with full military honours, in the graveyard of the local church – St Cross Church, Appleton Thorn. The Manchester branch of the Fleet Air Arm Association continue to celebrate the life of Anne McCormick in the annual remembrance service held at St Cross Church in June.

There are a total of 11 'war graves' in St Cross churchyard, of personnel from HMS Blackcap, including those of two Free Dutch Naval Officers serving in the Fleet Air Arm.

== Post-war operations ==
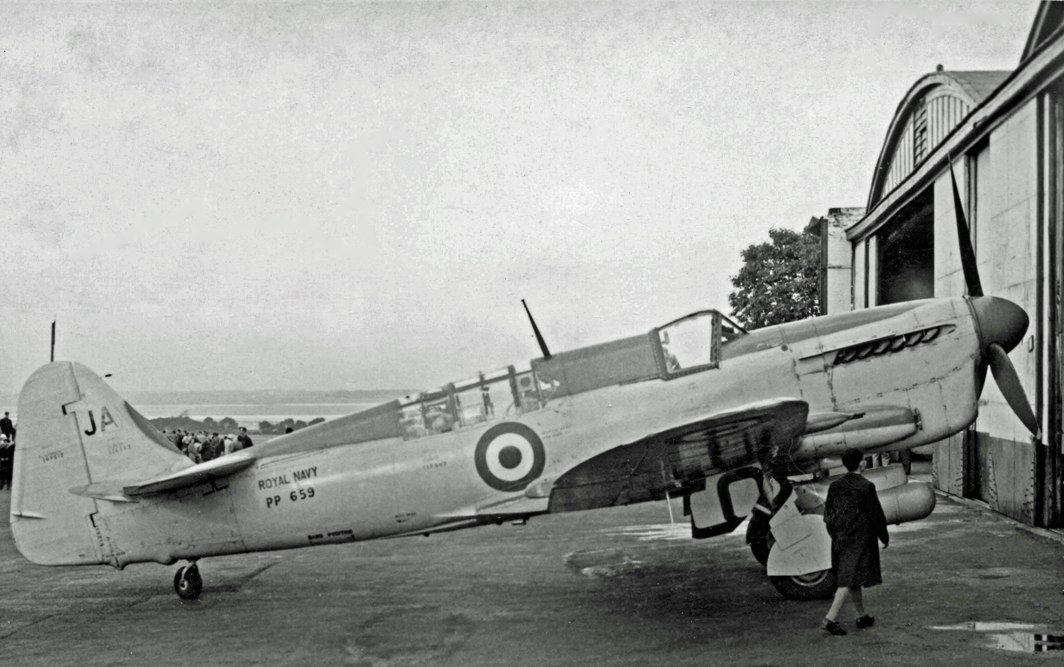
Fairey Firefly T.3 of 1841 Squadron in September 1952

At the end of the war American Naval Aircraft were flown into Blackcap to be broken up for disposal. The Aircraft Maintenance Yard meant that the airfield continued to operate and, at its peak, handled one third of all Fleet Air Arm Aircraft and all its spare engines.

In 1947 the Fleet Air Arm decided to form Royal Naval Volunteer Reserve Squadrons. The first to be based at Stretton was 1831 Naval Air Squadron, a fighter squadron, which was reformed here on 1 June 1947, initially equipped with Supermarine Seafire fighters and a single North American Harvard trainer.

It was joined on 18 August 1952 by 1841 Naval Air Squadron, an anti-submarine squadron equipped with the Fairey Firefly. Together, these Squadrons comprised the Fleet Air Arm's Northern Air Division which was formed at Stretton on 1 June 1952 and disbanded there on 10 March 1957 together with its constituent units.

767 Naval Air Squadron flying Supermarine Attackers was also based in Stretton. One notable incident included an Attacker FB Mk.1, WA535 which crashed on 5 February 1953 near Winwick, killing Commissioned Pilot RE Collingwood (aged 22). A second fatal accident took place on 10 November 1955 in an Attacker FB Mk2 WP281 172ST which crashed near RNAS Stretton while avoiding a collision with a Percival Sea Prince. The pilot was Lt Cmdr CJ Lavender DSC (aged 34). He is commemorated in the churchyard at Appleton Thorn.

The last squadron based at HMS Blackcap was 728B Naval Air Squadron, formed on 13 January 1958 to operate Fairey Firefly U.8 target drones. The squadron moved in February 1958 to HMS Falcon, Hal Far, Malta.

The airfield was closed on 4 November 1958.

In 2018 the site was acquired by Duncan Cameron. Planning permission was granted for building a new dwelling with a subterranean car storage facility.

== Units ==
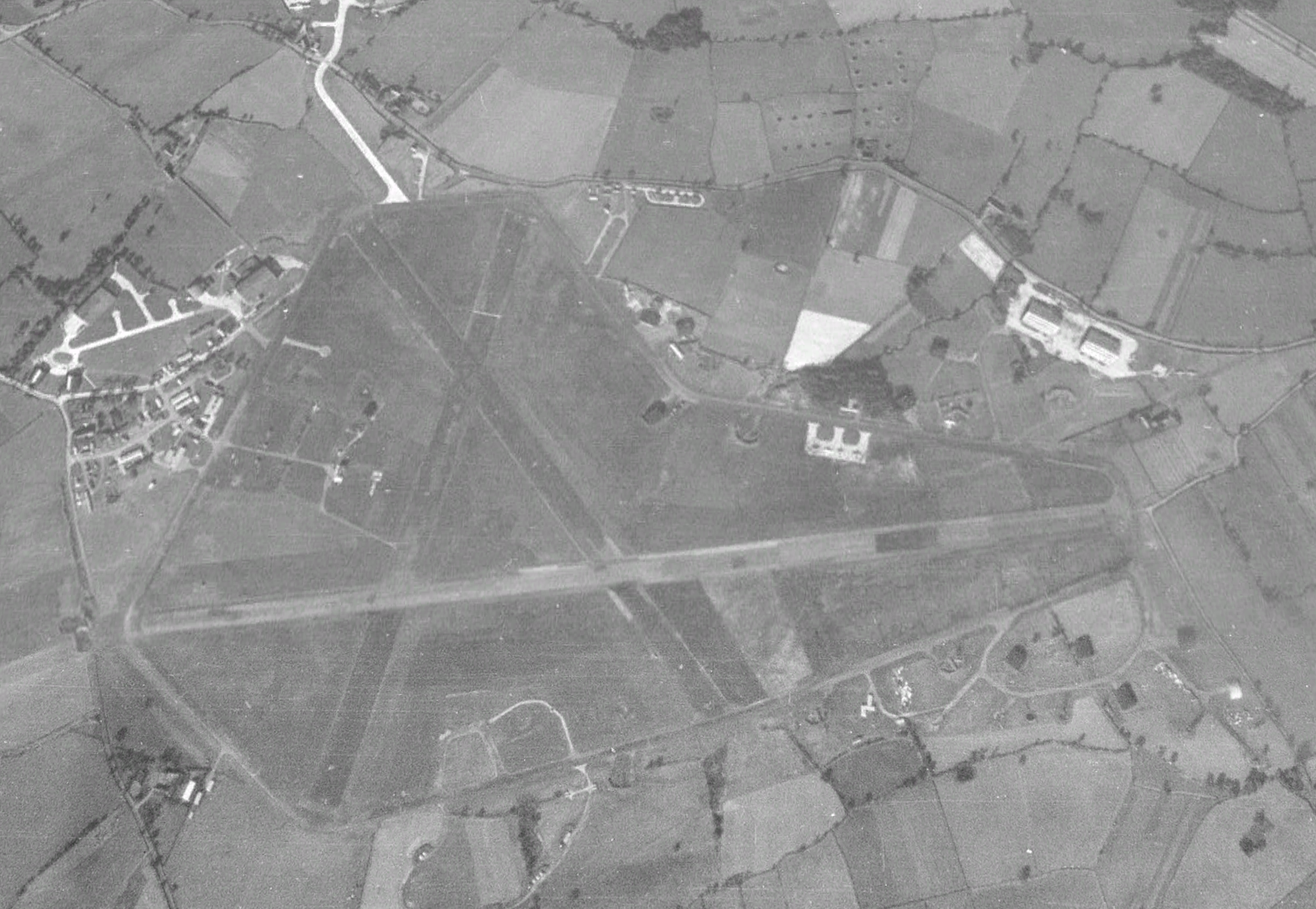
Original Layout of the airfield.

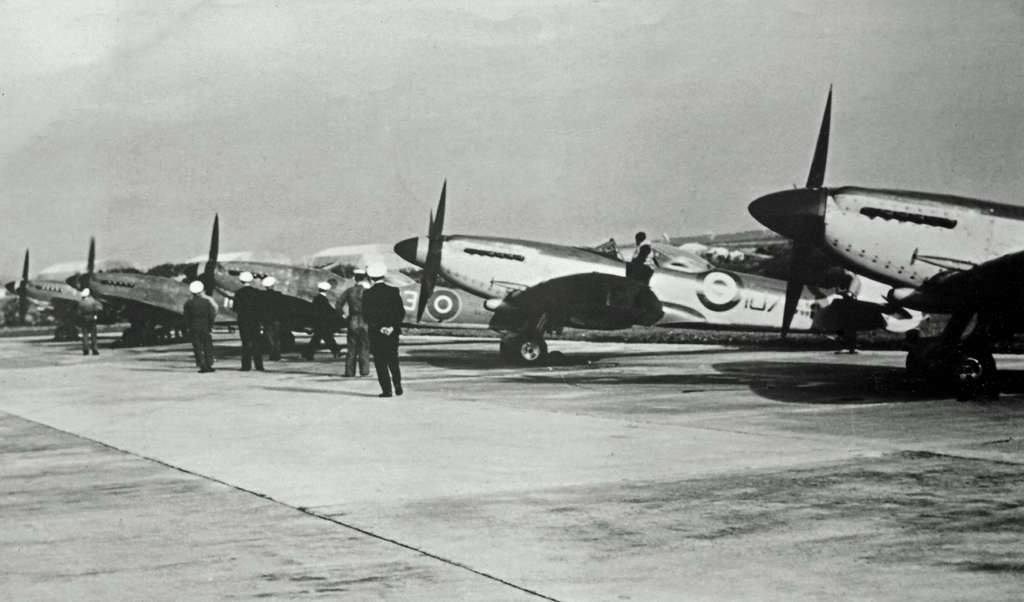
Seafire F.XVIIs of 1831 Squadron RNVR at Stretton in 1950

A number of units used the site:

- No. 2 Ferry Flight RAF
- 15th Naval Fighter Wing
- 47th Naval Fighter Wing
- 718 Naval Air Squadron: 25 April–4 July 1955
- 728B Naval Air Squadron: 13 January–26 February 1958
- 767 Naval Air Squadron: 20 September 1952–31 March 1955
- 798 Naval Air Squadron: 20 April–30 July 1944
- 801 Naval Air Squadron
- 802 Naval Air Squadron
- 807 Naval Air Squadron
- 808 Naval Air Squadron
- 809 Naval Air Squadron
- 810 Naval Air Squadron
- 811 Naval Air Squadron
- 812 Naval Air Squadron
- 813 Naval Air Squadron
- 814 Naval Air Squadron
- 815 Naval Air Squadron
- 821 Naval Air Squadron
- 825 Naval Air Squadron
  - 825X Naval Air Squadron
- 827 Naval Air Squadron
- 833 Naval Air Squadron
- 835 Naval Air Squadron
- 837 Naval Air Squadron
- 840 Naval Air Squadron
- 846 Naval Air Squadron
- 879 Naval Air Squadron
- 880 Naval Air Squadron
- 881 Naval Air Squadron
- 886 Naval Air Squadron
- 893 Naval Air Squadron
- 895 Naval Air Squadron
- 897 Naval Air Squadron
- 898 Naval Air Squadron
- 1830 Naval Air Squadron
- 1831 Naval Air Squadron
- 1832 Naval Air Squadron
- 1833 Naval Air Squadron
- 1834 Naval Air Squadron
- 1836 Naval Air Squadron
- 1837 Naval Air Squadron
- 1840 Naval Air Squadron
- 1841 Naval Air Squadron
- 1842 Naval Air Squadron

== See also ==
- RAF Burtonwood
