= Operation Light =

British naval operation in World War II

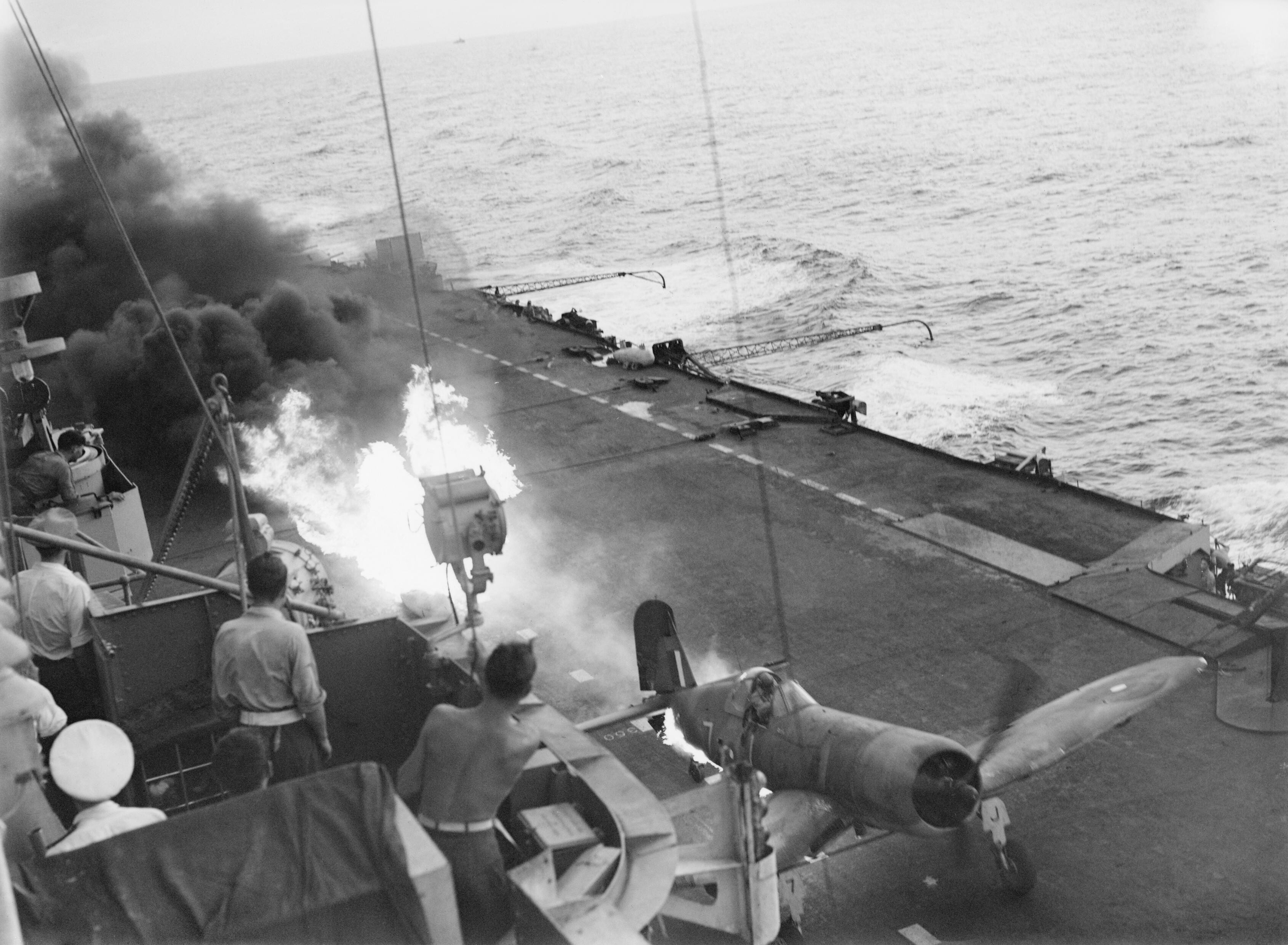
F4U Corsair making an emergency landing on board HMS Victorious following a raid on Japanese positions in Sigli, Sumatra. Its drop tank became detached and ignited.

Operation Light was a British naval operation in World War II under the command of Rear Admiral Clement Moody. The objective was to carry out aerial strikes on Japanese positions in Sigli, Northern Sumatra, Indonesia, and aerial reconnaissance over the Nicobar Islands, from 16–23 September 1944. The operation was scheduled to coincide with the Allied landing at Morotai, designated Operation Tradewind, as well as the U.S. 1st Marine Division's landing at Peleliu.

== Operational detail ==
The operation was carried out by aircraft carriers HMS Victorious and HMS Indomitable, carrying Vought F4U Corsairs, and escorted by battleship HMS Howe, cruisers Cumberland, destroyers Racehorse, Raider, Rapid, Redoubt, Relentless, Rocket, Rotherham.

The raid saw a number of problems. First, due to technical inefficiencies of the aircraft carriers, Victorious was only able to launch 22 aircraft, and Indomitable took "forty minutes and two separate deckloads to dispatch just eighteen aircraft." Secondly, "the Fleet Air Arm crews suffered from a lack of target intelligence, a consequence of the lack of very long range (V.L.R.) reconnaissance aircraft based in India and Ceylon." One report of the raid states that "After the attack, the fighters roamed the area looking for the most impressive buildings in the area. These would then be machine gunned in the hope that the Japanese overlords were in residence."
