= Operation Banquet (Padang) =

1944 British air raid against the Japanese

- Part of the Pacific Theatre of the Second World War
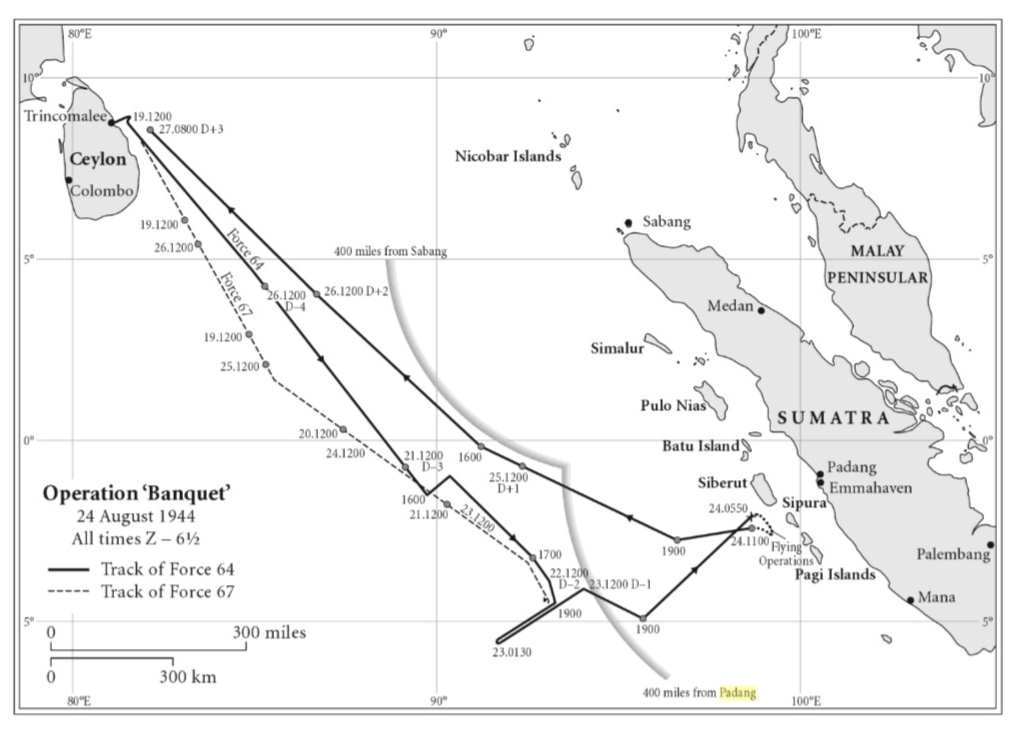
- Operation Banquet
Date	24 August 1944
Location	Padang, Netherlands East Indies 00°57′00″S 100°21′11″E
Result	Allied victory

Belligerents
United Kingdom	Japan

Commanders and leaders
(United Kingdom) Clement Moody	

Strength
20–32 bombers; 19–31 fighters; 2 aircraft carriers; 1 battleship; 2 cruisers; 5 destroyers; 1 submarine	Anti-aircraft defences

Casualties and losses
1 fighter destroyed	Ground targets damaged

Operation Banquet was a British operation of the Royal Navy in the Second World War, commanded by Rear Admiral Clement Moody. The objective was to bomb Japanese positions in and around Padang, on the south-western coast of Sumatra, in Indonesia, on 24 August 1944. The targets of the attack, Padang airfield, the Indaroeng cement works, and the harbor facilities and shipping at Emmahaven were also hit.

== Background ==
=== Force 64 ===
Ships involved in the operation included the aircraft carriers HMS Victorious and Indomitable, the battleship HMS Howe, two cruisers, including HMS Cumberland, five destroyers and a submarine. Indomitable was carrying 28 F6F Hellcat fighters under Lieutenant Commander T. G. C. Jameson and 28 Fairey Barracuda bombers under Lieutenant Commander E. M. Britten. Many of the pilots were inexperienced and the British hoped that the mission would provide some additional training for them.

=== Plan ===
The plan was to attack Padang airfield, Emmahaven harbour and the Indaroeng cement works. The cement works was the only factory of its kind in South-East Asia. If it was destroyed, the Japanese would be unable to construct fortifications or new buildings in the region. The raid was also supposed to divert the Japanese from the American landings of the Battle of Hollandia and the Landing at Aitape. Reconnaissance photographs were also to be taken.

== Prelude ==
The force set out from Trincomalee on 19 August, delaying for 24 hours for the submarine HMS Sea Rover to replace Severn, which was experiencing technical difficulties. The cruisers and destroyers were refuelled on 23 August from the replenishment oiler Easedale.

== Operation ==
The force arrived at its position at 05:00 on 24 August. There was a light wind coming from the south-east, so the carriers had to launch while steaming at 27 kn (50 km/h; 31 mph). Howe could not keep up and temporarily fell out of formation. The first wave consisted of twenty Barracudas (ten from each carrier) with 500 lb (230 kg) bombs and an escort of 19 Vought F4U Corsairs. The second wave launched at 07:10, consisting of twelve Barracudas (nine from Indomitable, three from Victorious) with an escort of twelve Corsairs from Victorious. The port and the airfield were not used by the Japanese and there was little allotted to defend them. There was no air opposition and the bombing was accurate. One Corsair was shot down by light anti-aircraft fire.

== Aftermath ==
In spite of the accurate bombing, the targets proved to be of little strategic value. The new pilots did not gain much experience either, since they encountered only negligible opposition. The Japanese were not induced to divert resources from the Americans at Hollandia (now Jayapura) in New Guinea, according to the post-war testimony of Lieutenant-General Numata Takazo, the former chief of staff of the Southern Expeditionary Army Group. The only notable success was the aerial photography from the Wildcats, that yielded excellent results. The operation "marked the first time the British used a two-wave attack by two fleet carriers". It came as an unpleasant surprise to the British that the brand new Howe, designed to achieve speeds of 28 kn (52 km/h; 32 mph), could not keep pace with the carriers at 27 kn (50 km/h; 31 mph). In spite of the relatively small distance covered, Victorious consumed about a quarter of her fuel.

== Bibliography ==
- Hobbs, David (2012). The British Pacific Fleet: The Royal Navy's Most Powerful Strike Force (2nd ed.). Seaforth. ISBN 978-1-78346-922-2.
- McCart, Neil (1998). HMS Victorious, 1937–1969. Cheltenham: Fan. ISBN 978-1-901225-01-3.
- Rohwer, Jürgen; Hümmelchen, Gerhard (2005) [1972]. Chronology of the War at Sea, 1939–1945: The Naval History of World War Two (3rd rev. ed.). London: Chatham. ISBN 978-1-86176-257-3.
- Sturtivant, Ray (1990). British Naval Aviation: The Fleet Air Arm, 1917–1990. Annapolis, MD: Naval Institute Press. ISBN 0-87021-026-2.
- War with Japan: The Advance to Japan. Vol. VI. London: HMSO (Ministry of Defence Naval Historical Branch). 1995. ISBN 0-11-772821-7.
- Whitley, M. J. (1998). Battleships of World War Two: An International Encyclopaedia. Annapolis, MD: Naval Institute Press. ISBN 978-1-55750-184-4.
- Willmott, H. P. (1996). Grave of a Dozen Schemes: British Naval Planning and the War Against Japan, 1943–1945. Annapolis, MD: Naval Institute Press. ISBN 978-1-55750-916-1.
