= Port of Teluk Bayur =

Port in Bayur Bay of Padang City, West Sumatra, Indonesia

Coordinates: 0°59′53″S 100°22′32″E

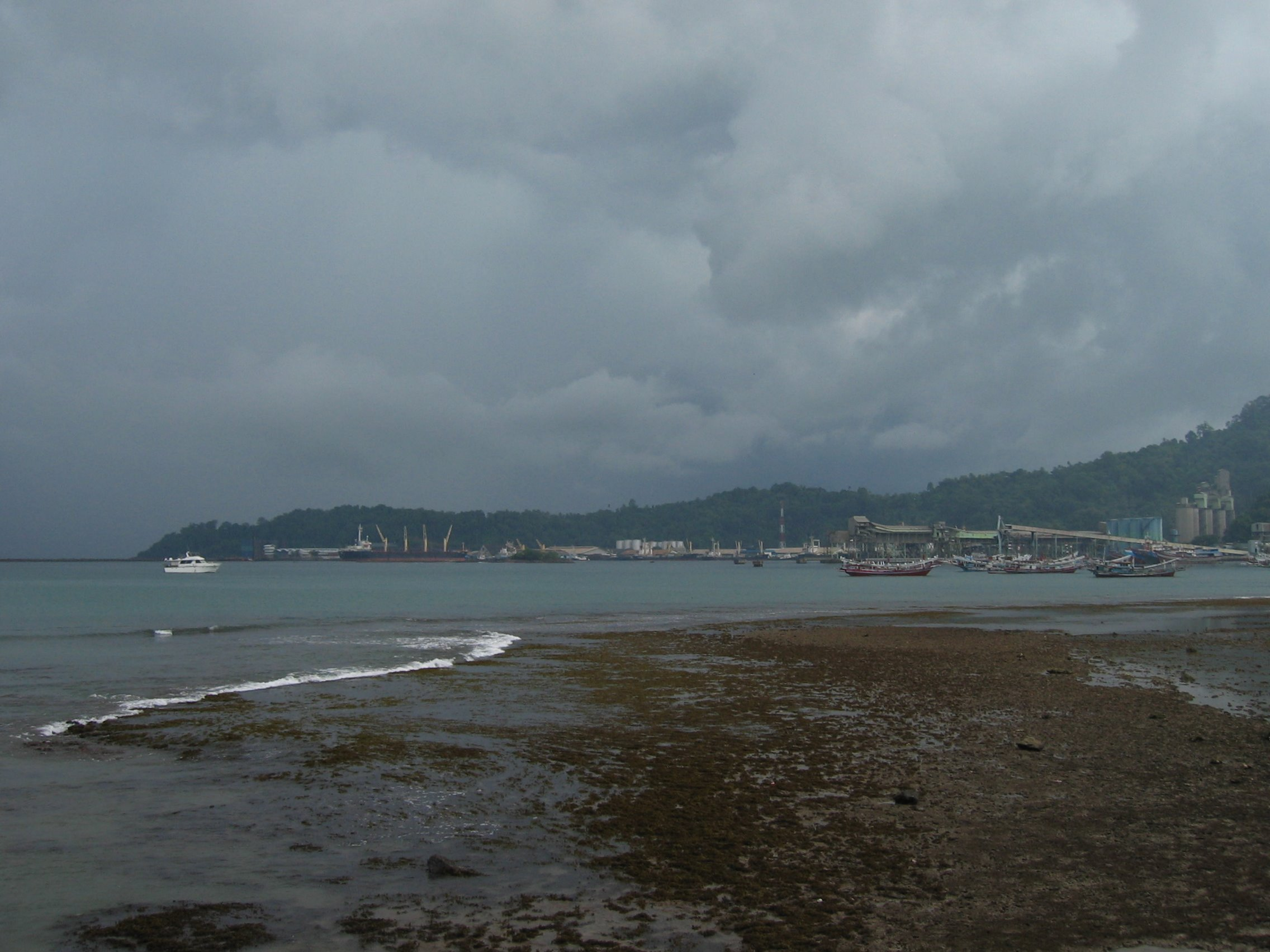
Teluk Bayur port

Teluk Bayur (Minangkabau: Taluak Bayua) formerly known as Emma Haven or Emmahaven is a port located in Bayur Bay of Padang City, West Sumatra, Indonesia. The port, the largest and busiest on the western coast of Sumatra, is operated by the government-owned company PT. (Persero) Pelabuhan Indonesia II (Indonesia Port Corporation II).

The port was originally built in 1888 by the Dutch colonial government. On April 29, 2013, a new container terminal was officially opened by West Sumatra Governor Irwan Prayitno that can handle more than 4,000 containers in a 46,886 square-meter area.

== Renovation ==
The renovation project, which ran from 2011 to 2015 with a cost of Rp1.7 trillion ($185.8 million), changed the conventional face of Teluk Bayur Port into a modern one. The new port will reduce the time ships have to queue from an average of 10 days to a reasonable time with 3 separate berths to handle containers and bulk goods. A multi-purpose terminal and container terminal will also be expanded from 150 meters to 500 meters with 7 cranes, so 16 large-scale ships can dock at the same time, rising from its current capacity of 10 ships.
