= 11th Carrier Air Group =

Royal Navy Fleet Air Arm Carrier Air Group

- Active: 30 June 1945 to 30 November 1945
- Country: United Kingdom
- Branch: Royal Navy
- Type: Carrier Air Group
- Size: 3 x fighter squadron; 1 x TBR squadron
- Part of: Fleet Air Arm
- Formed for: modified Illustrious-class aircraft carrier

The 11th Carrier Air Group (11th CAG) was a Fleet Air Arm (FAA) carrier air group of the Royal Navy (RN). It was formed in June 1945, at HMS Nabbington, a Royal Navy, Mobile Naval Operating Air Base (MONAB), established at the Royal Australian Air Force (RAAF) base RAAF Nowra at Nowra, New South Wales, in Australia, for service in the British Pacific Fleet, until disbanding in November of the same year. The group was for the modified Illustrious-class aircraft carrier HMS Indomitable.

== Naval Air Squadrons ==
11th Carrier Air Group consisted of a number of squadrons of the Fleet Air Arm.

Squadron	Aircraft	From	To
857 Naval Air Squadron	Grumman Avenger Mk.II	June 1945	November 1945
1839 Naval Air Squadron	Grumman Hellcat F. Mk. I, II	June 1945	November 1945
1844 Naval Air Squadron	Grumman Hellcat F. Mk. II	June 1945	November 1945

== History ==
Following the conclusion of World War II in Europe, the squadrons of the Fleet Air Arm, which were based on the Royal Navy's Fleet and Light Fleet aircraft carriers for the British Pacific Fleet, underwent a significant reorganisation into Air Groups. This restructuring aligned with the operational strategies of the United States Navy and aimed to improve combat effectiveness against Japanese forces in the Pacific Theater during 1945. HMS Indomitable, the only ship of her class, was assigned Carrier Air Groups eleven and twelve. Each group comprised two squadrons of twenty-four Grumman Hellcats, one squadron of fifteen Grumman Avengers, and one squadron of twelve Fairey Fireflies.

=== 1945 ===
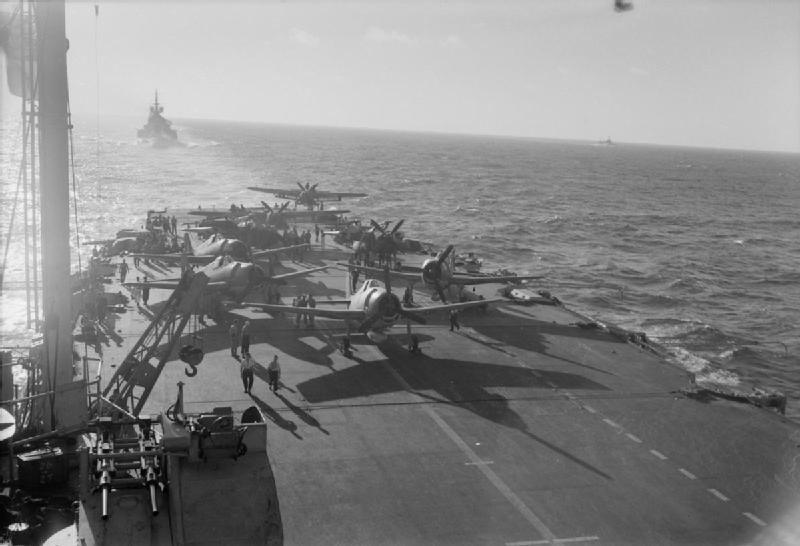
Fairey Barracudas and Grumman Hellcats being ranged on the flight deck of HMS Indomitable in 1945

On 30 June, the 5th Naval Fighter Wing was officially disbanded, leading to the integration of its Grumman Hellcat fighter squadrons, specifically 1839 and 1844 Squadrons, into the newly formed 11th Carrier Air Group (11 CAG). This group also included 857 Squadron, which was equipped with Grumman Avengers, with the group commanded by Commander N.S. Luard of the Royal Navy.

The 11 CAG was stationed at the Royal Naval Air Station at Nowra, HMS Nabbington, New South Wales, while HMS Indomitable underwent a refit, which was completed in late July. Following a shakedown period after the refit, HMS Indomitable took on her Air Group on 3 August to engage in flying training in preparation for her return to active combat. Designated as the flagship of the new 11th Aircraft Carrier Squadron, HMS Indomitable was ready for operations.

By 10 August, indications emerged that Japan was prepared to accept surrender terms, prompting the re-allocation of all ships in Australian waters to form Task Group 111, tasked with the re-occupation of the former Crown Colonies in Hong Kong. The carrier and group were at sea when the announcement of Japan's surrender was made. During their time in Hong Kong, ship and squadron personnel were assigned to various policing and guard duties throughout the colony, with many present for the official Japanese surrender of Hong Kong on 16 September.

HMS Indomitable departed for Australia on 27 September and disembarked her Air Group to HMS Nabbington on 10 October. Upon arrival at RNAS Nowra, the squadron aircraft were withdrawn, and personnel from 1839 and 1844 Squadrons were re-embarked on 20 October as the ship set sail for the United Kingdom. 857 Squadron resumed its operational status upon the carrier's departure at sea on the 22. Ultimately, the 11th Carrier Air Group and its constituent squadrons were disbanded upon their arrival in the UK on 30 November.

=== Aircraft carriers ===
Aircraft carrier which the 11th Carrier Air Group was assigned to:

- HMS Indomitable (June - November 1945)

=== Aircraft used ===
Aircraft used by the naval air squadrons that formed the 8th Carrier Air Group in 1945:

- Grumman Avenger, an American carrier-based fighter aircraft
- Grumman Avenger, an American torpedo bomber

== See also ==
- List of Fleet Air Arm groups
- List of aircraft carriers of the Royal Navy
- List of aircraft of the Fleet Air Arm
- List of Fleet Air Arm aircraft in World War II
