= 1844 Naval Air Squadron =

Inactive Royal Navy Fleet Air Arm and Reserve Air Squadron

- Squadron badge
- Active: 1943–1945; 1954–1957
- Disbanded: 10 March 1957
- Country: United Kingdom
- Branch: Royal Navy
- Type: Single seat fighter squadron; Royal Naval Volunteer Reserve Air Squadron
- Role: Fighter squadron; Anti-submarine squadron
- Part of: Fleet Air Arm
- Home station: See Naval air stations section for full list.
- Motto: Strength in reserve
- Aircraft: See Aircraft flown section for full list.
- Engagements: World War II: Pacific War; Operation Boomerang; Operation Banquet; Operation Light; Operation Millet; Operation Robson; Operation Lentil; Operation Meridian; Operation Iceberg
- Battle honours: East Indies 1944-45; Palembang 1945; Okinawa 1945

Insignia
- Squadron Badge Description: Blue, in base two bars wavy white on a rock issuant from sinister a panther couchant all proper (1955)
- Identification Markings: 6A+ R6A+ (October 1944); 131-146, 162-163 (March 1945); 201-206, 252-264 to 891-896 (Firefly); 257-258 to 897-898 (Sea Balliol January 1956); 892-896 (Avenger)
- Fin Carrier/Shore Codes: W (March 1945); BR (Firefly, Sea Balliol & Avenger)

1844 Naval Air Squadron (1844 NAS) was a Fleet Air Arm (FAA) naval air squadron of the United Kingdom's Royal Navy (RN) between 1943 and 1945 and then a Royal Naval Volunteer Reserve Air Squadron from 1954 to 1957. It formed in Northern Ireland at HMS Gannet, RNAS Eglinton, in December 1943, as a fighter squadron. It embarked in HMS Begum, in February 1944, for the Far East, arriving in Ceylon, in June and joining HMS Indomitable the following month. August, September and October saw the squadron undertake photographic reconnaissance and provide fighter cover for the attacks on Indaroeng and Emmahaven in Sumatra, then on Sigli, followed by the Nicobar Islands respectively.

During the first two months of 1945 it performed similar roles attacking the oil installations at Belawan Deli, airfields at Pangkalan Brandan, and oil refineries at Palembang. Raids on the Sakashima Islands and also Formosa followed. When the Second World War ended, its aircraft were left behind at HMS Nabbington and the squadron's personnel returned to the UK, disbanding on arrival in November 1945.

In February 1954, the squadron reformed at HMS Gamecock, RNAS Bramcote, as a Royal Naval Volunteer Reserve Air Branch anti-submarine squadron in the Midland Air Division. However, in March 1957, 1844 RNVR Air Squadron disbanded under that year's defence cuts.

== History ==
=== Single-seat fighter squadron (1944–1945) ===
1844 Naval Air Squadron formed on 15 December 1943 in Northern Ireland at RNAS Eglinton (HMS Gannet), which was located just outside Derry, as a Single Seat Fighter Squadron, under the command of Lieutenant Commander(A) T.W. Harrington, RN.

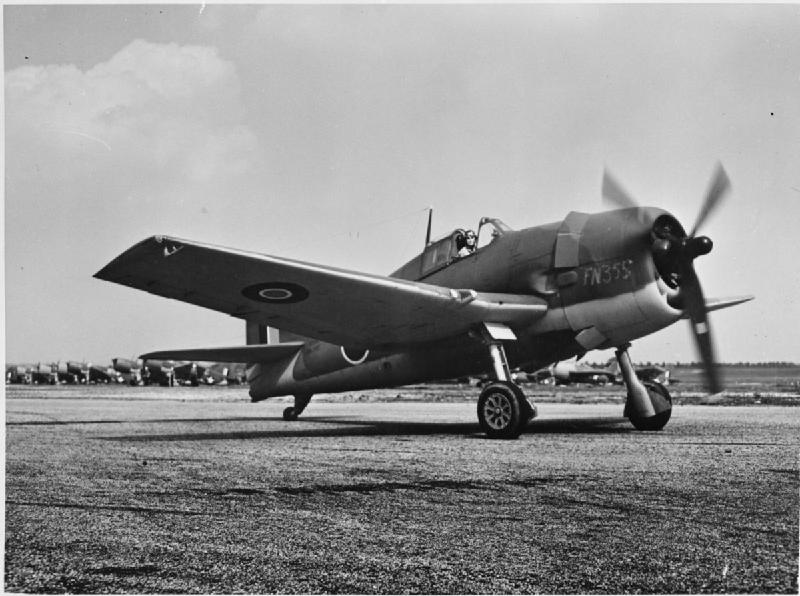
A Fleet Air Arm Grumman Hellcat

It formed part of the 5th Naval Fighter Wing, along with 1839 Naval Air Squadron, and was initially equipped with ten Grumman Hellcat, an American carrier-based fighter aircraft. These were the F6F-3 variant, designated Hellcat F. Mk. I by the Fleet Air Arm.

On 25 February 1844, Naval Air Squadron flew to Royal Naval Air Maintenance Yard Belfast (HMS Gadwall), Belfast, embarking the following day in the Ruler-class escort carrier, HMS Begum. With loading completed two days later, HMS Begum returned to the Clyde to finish loading stores and passengers before sailing on 3 March for the Far East, the squadron disembarked at Madras, India, on 10 April and immediately flew to RAF Ulunderpet.

In early June 1944, Naval Air Squadron moved to Ceylon, arriving at RNAS Colombo Racecourse (HMS Berhunda), Colombo, on the 7, then moving again to RN Air Section China Bay, located at RAF China Bay, Trincomalee, on the 12. Here the squadron undertook Deck Landing Training (DLT) on the aircraft repair ship and light aircraft carrier, HMS Unicorn during 14-15.

After working up, the Wing embarked in the modified Illustrious-class aircraft carrier, HMS Indomitable, on 25 July, and during August provided fighter cover for the attacks on Indaroeng and Emmahaven in Sumatra, Operations Boomerang and Banquet, as well as providing photographic reconnaissance. The same roles ware undertaken in September during the attacks on Sigli, Operation Light, and in October the squadron provided fighter cover for the attack on Car Nicobar, Operation Millet.

At the beginning of September the squadron CO, Lieutenant Commander Harrington, was appointed as the new 5th Naval Fighter Wing leader, he was replaced as CO by Lieutenant Commander(A) M.S. Godson RN.

It returned to Ceylon, flying to RN Air Section China Bay, on 21 October, but later in 1944, in December, the squadron re-embarked for operations, in HMS Indomitable, participating in attacks on the oil installations at Belawan Deli in Sumatra, Operation Robson. In January 1945, airfields were attacked at Pangkalan Brandan, Operation Lentil and later in the same month, oil refineries were attacked at Palembang in Operation Meridian. Sailing to Australia, 1844 Naval Air Squadron disembarked to RNAS Nowra (HMS Nabbington) (Mobile Naval Air Base No. 1), which was at RAAF Nowra, New South Wales, and here it exchanged its aircraft and received eighteen improved Grumman Wildcat fighters. These were the F6F-5 Hellcat, known as Hellcat F. Mk. II in Fleet Air Arm service.

The squadron re-embarked in HMS Indomitable on 27 February, for Operation Iceberg, which included the attacks on the Sakishima Gunto group of islands, and also Formosa. During Operation Iceberg, on 12 May, the squadron CO, Lieutenant Commander M.S. Godson, was killed. His aircraft was hit by flak, while dive bombing at Hirara airfield on Miyako, causing a fire and the aircraft dived and exploded on hitting the ground. His replacement was Lieutenant Commander(A) P.J.P. Leckie, RN.

On 5 June the squadron disembarked back to RNAS Nowra (HMS Nabbington) and on 30 the 5th Naval Fighter Wing was disbanded. It was immediately replaced with the 11th Carrier Air Group (11 CAG), which included 1839 and 1844 Naval Air Squadrons from the Wing, and along with 857 Naval Air Squadron. The Admiralty had decided to move to the American system of all ships squadrons under a single Carrier Air Group (CAG).

However, following the Japanese surrender, further planned operations during August were cancelled. The aircraft remained in Australia at RNAS Nowra (HMS Nabbington), while the squadron personnel sailed on HMS Indomitable for the United Kingdom, where it disbanded on arrival, on 30 November.

== Royal Naval Volunteer Reserve Air Squadron ==
=== Anti-submarine squadron (1954-1957) ===
1844 Naval Air Squadron reformed at RNAS Bramcote (HMS Gamecock), Nuneaton, Warwickshire, on 15 February 1954, as a Royal Naval Volunteer Reserve Air Branch, anti-submarine squadron, in the Midland Air Division, under the command of Lieutenant Commander(A) D. Woodhead, RNVR.

It was equipped initially with six Fairey Firefly, a British anti-submarine aircraft. These were the AS.Mk 5 variant which carried American sonobuoys and equipment. In December 1955 these were swapped for six AS.Mk 6, which carried British equipment. The squadron replaced the Fairey Firefly aircraft in March 1956, when it received six Grumman Avenger, an American torpedo bomber. These were the TBM-3S variant, known as Avenger AS5 by the Fleet Air Arm.

In 1957, the Minister of Defence's White Paper on Defence, announced the ending of the Royal Naval Volunteer Reserve Air Branch, The organisation, and its squadrons, were disbanded on 10 March 1957.

== Aircraft flown ==
The squadron has flown a number of different aircraft types, including:

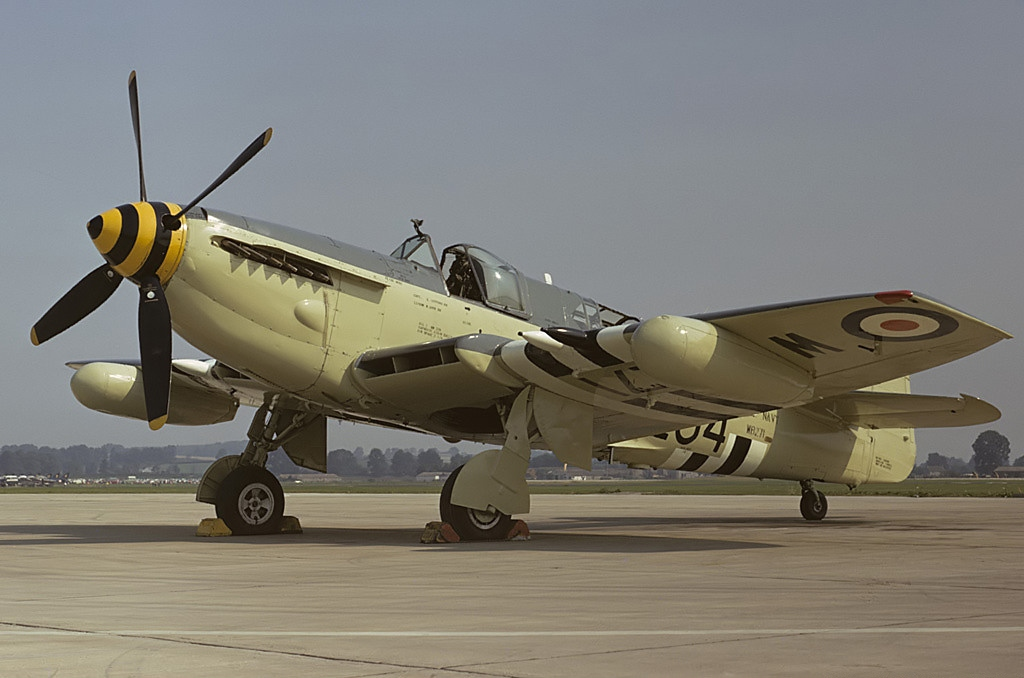
Fairey Firefly AS.Mk 5

- Grumman Hellcat F. Mk. I fighter aircraft (December 1943 - May 1945)
- Grumman Hellcat F. Mk. II fighter aircraft (February - October 1945)
- Fairey Firefly T.Mk 2 operational training aircraft (February - September 1954)
- Fairey Firefly T.Mk 3 anti-submarine warfare training of observers (February - September 1954)
- Fairey Firefly AS.Mk 5 anti-submarine aircraft (February 1954 - December 1955)
- Boulton Paul Sea Balliol T.Mk 21 advanced trainer (June 1954 - January 1957)
- Percival Sea Prince T1 transport aircraft (July 1954 - October 1956)
- Fairey Firefly AS.Mk 6 anti-submarine aircraft (December 1955 - June 1956)
- de Havilland Dominie short-haul airliner (February 1956 - January 1957)
- Grumman Avenger AS5 anti-submarine strike aircraft (March 1956 - January 1957)

== Battle honours ==
The battle honours awarded to 1844 Naval Air Squadron are:

- East Indies 1944-45
- Palembang 1945
- Okinawa 1945

== Assignments ==
1844 Naval Air Squadron was assigned as needed to form part of a number of larger units:

- 5th Naval Fighter Wing (December 1943 - 30 June 1945)
- 11th Carrier Air Group (30 June - 30 November 1945)

== Naval air stations ==
1844 Naval Air Squadron operated from a number of naval air stations of the Royal Navy, in the United Kingdom, and overseas, and a Royal Navy fleet carrier and a couple of escort carriers:

1943 - 1945

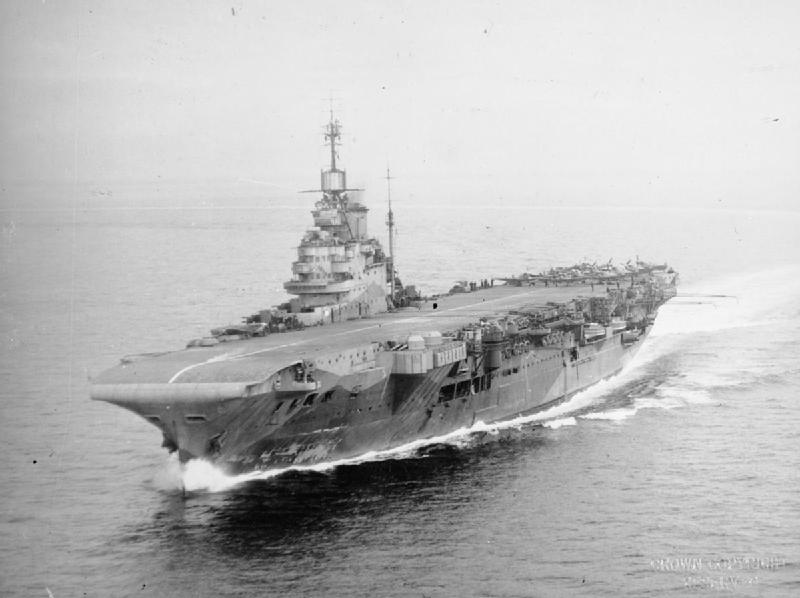
HMS Indomitable

- Royal Naval Air Station Eglinton (HMS Gannet), County Londonderry, (15 December 1943 - 25 February 1944)
- Royal Naval Air Maintenance Yard Belfast (HMS Gadwall), County Antrim, (25 - 26 February 1944)
- HMS Begum (26 February - 10 April 1944)
- Royal Air Force Ulunderpet, India, (10 April - 7 June 1944)
- Royal Naval Air Station Colombo Racecourse (HMS Berhunda), Ceylon, (7 - 12 June 1944)
- RN Air Section China Bay, Ceylon, (12 - 18 June 1944)
  - HMS Unicorn DLT (14 - 16 June 1944)
- Royal Naval Air Station Colombo Racecourse HMS (Berhunda), Ceylon, (18 June - 25 July 1944)
- HMS Indomitable (25 July - 21 October 1944)
- RN Air Section China Bay, Ceylon, (21 October - 1 December 1944)
- HMS Indomitable (1 - 9 December 1944)
- Royal Naval Air Station Trincomalee (HMS Bambara), Ceylon, (9 - 14 December 1944)
- HMS Indomitable (14 December 1944 - 10 February 1945)
- Royal Naval Air Station Nowra (HMS Nabbington), New South Wales, (10 - 27 February 1945)
- HMS Indomitable (27 February - 5 June 1945)
- Royal Naval Air Station Nowra (HMS Nabbington), New South Wales, (5 June - 3 August 1945)
- HMS Indomitable (3 - 11 August 1945)
- Royal Naval Air Station Nowra (HMS Nabbington), New South Wales, (11 - 16 August 1945)
- HMS Indomitable (16 August - 10 October 1945)
- Royal Naval Air Station Nowra (HMS Nabbington), New South Wales, (10 - 22 October 1945)
- HMS Indomitable (crews) (22 October - 30 November 1945)
- disbanded - United Kingdom (30 November 1945)

1954 - 1957

- Royal Naval Air Station Bramcote (HMS Gamecock), Warwickshire, (15 February 1954 - 10 March 1957)
  - Annual training:
    - Royal Naval Air Station Hal Far (HMS Falcon), Malta, (4 - 17 September 1954)
    - Royal Naval Air Station Hal Far (HMS Falcon), Malta, (22 August - 2 September 1955)
    - Royal Naval Air Station Hal Far (HMS Falcon), Malta, (29 July - October 1956)
- disbanded - 10 March 1957

== Commanding officers ==
List of commanding officers of 1844 Naval Air Squadron with date of appointment:

1943 - 1945

- Lieutenant Commander(A) T.W. Harrington, RN, from 15 December 1943
- Lieutenant Commander(A) M.S. Godson, RN, from 9 September 1944 (KiA 12 May 1945)
- Lieutenant Commander(A) P.J.P. Leckie, RN, from 12 May 1945
- disbanded - 30 November 1945

1954 - 1957

- Lieutenant Commander(A) D. Woodhead, RNVR, from 15 February 1954
- disbanded - 10 March 1957

Note: Abbreviation (A) signifies Air Branch of the RN or RNVR.
