= 5th Naval Fighter Wing =

Royal Navy Fleet Air Arm aircraft wing

- White Ensign
- Active: December 1943 – June 1945
- Disbanded: 30 June 1945
- Country: United Kingdom
- Branch: Royal Navy
- Type: Naval fighter Wing
- Role: Carrier-based fighter
- Size: Two squadrons
- Part of: Fleet Air Arm
- Aircraft carrier: HMS Indomitable
- Engagements: World War II: Indian Ocean in World War II; Operation Banquet; Operation Light; Operation Millet; Operation Robson; Operation Lentil; Operation Meridian; Pacific War; Operation Iceberg

Commanders
- Notable commanders: Commander H.P. Sears, RN; Commander T.G.C. Jameson, RN; Lieutenant Commander(A) T.W. Harrington, RN

Insignia
- Wing Code: R

Aircraft flown
- Fighter: Grumman Hellcat F. Mk. I & F. Mk. II

5th Naval Fighter Wing ("5 Wing") was a Fleet Air Arm fighter formation of the Royal Navy during the Second World War. It was formed at RNAS Eglinton in December 1943 with 1839 and 1844 Naval Air Squadrons, both equipped with Grumman Hellcat fighter aircraft. The wing initially prepared for service in the escort carrier HMS Begum, before transferring to the fleet carrier HMS Indomitable in July 1944. It subsequently served with the Eastern Fleet and, from December 1944, with the British Pacific Fleet.

The wing participated in operations against Japanese positions and installations in the East Indies, including Operation Millet, Operation Robson, Operation Lentil and Operation Meridian, before taking part in Operation Iceberg, the British Pacific Fleet's operations in support of the Battle of Okinawa. It was disbanded on 30 June 1945, when its two squadrons became part of the newly formed 11th Carrier Air Group.

== History ==
=== Formation and training ===
The 5th Naval Fighter Wing was formed at RNAS Eglinton, County Londonderry, in December 1943 consisting 1839 Naval Air Squadron and 1844 Naval Air Squadron. 1839 Squadron had formed on 15 November 1943 with ten Hellcat I fighters, while 1844 Squadron formed on 15 December also with ten Hellcat Is. The two squadrons were combined to form 5 Wing for service in the Illustrious-class aircraft carrier HMS Indomitable. During their work-up at RNAS Eglinton, the squadrons conducted navigation, low-flying, formation flying and combat-training exercises.

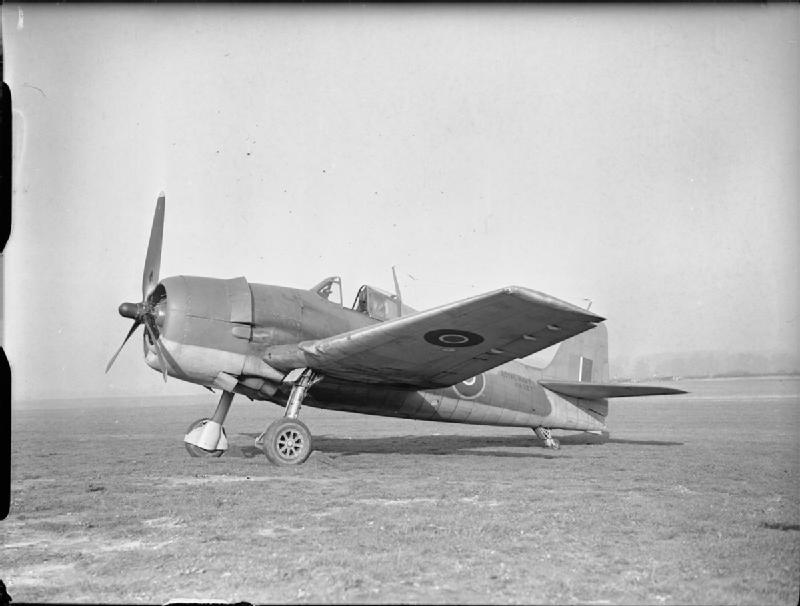
Grumman Hellcat

Commander H.P. Sears was responsible for the wing during its initial period of training. He was succeeded as Senior Officer Air by Commander T.G.C. Jameson on 7 April 1944. Wragg records the same three principal wing appointments as the later operational history: Sears from 28 February, Jameson from 7 April, and Lieutenant Commander(A) T.W. Harrington from 9 September 1944.

The wing's initial deployment was in the Ruler-class escort carrier HMS Begum. The escort carrier sailed in February 1944 to join the Eastern Fleet, after which the wing's squadrons were moved through India and Ceylon as preparations for front-line service continued. On 25 July 1944 the wing embarked in HMS Indomitable and thereafter operated as part of the carrier's air group.

=== Eastern Fleet ===
During the summer and autumn of 1944, 5 Wing operated from HMS Indomitable with the Eastern Fleet. Its aircraft participated in offensive operations against Japanese positions and installations in the Dutch East Indies, including Operation Banquet and Operation Light. The wing also took part in Operation Millet, conducted against Japanese positions in the Nicobar Islands between 17 and 20 October 1944.

During the October operations, Sub-Lieutenant D.F. Grinham of 1844 Squadron was killed on 19 October when his Grumman Hellcat was shot down into the sea during a dogfight with a Japanese fighter. The engagement occurred during operations in which Fleet Air Arm fighters claimed several Japanese aircraft.

Following the October operations, 5 Wing was disembarked from HMS Indomitable at RN Air Section China Bay, Ceylon, on 21 October. On 22 November HMS Indomitable, together with the name ship of her class HMS Illustrious and sister ship HMS Victorious, was transferred to the newly established British Pacific Fleet. 857 Naval Air Squadron subsequently joined HMS Indomitable on 27 November, followed by 5 Wing on 1 December 1944.

=== British Pacific Fleet ===
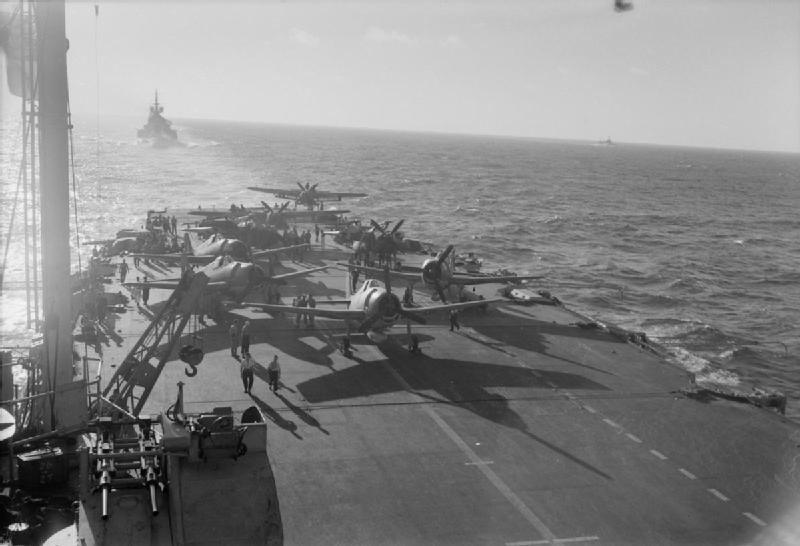
Fairey Barracudas and Grumman Hellcats being ranged on the flight deck of HMS Indomitable

With HMS Indomitable, 5 Wing formed part of the British Pacific Fleet's carrier forces during the operations against Japanese installations in Sumatra. The Grumman Hellcat squadrons had been increased to fourteen aircraft each by this stage, and the wing operated alongside 857 Naval Air Squadron in HMS Indomitable's air group.

==== Operation Robson ====
On 20 December 1944, HMS Indomitable took part in Operation Robson, the first of a series of British Pacific Fleet strikes against Japanese oil installations on Sumatra. The primary target was the refinery at Pangkalan Brandan, but poor weather prevented the attacking force from locating the objective. The strike was consequently diverted to Belawan Deli, where the aircraft attacked Japanese installations and shipping facilities. Eight Grumman Hellcats from 5 Wing provided fighter cover for the strike force, with further Grumman Hellcats providing close cover.

The operation was followed by a return to RNAS Trincomalee, Ceylon, and preparations for further attacks on Sumatra. The December operation formed part of the wider series of raids subsequently known as Operation Outflank.

==== Operation Lentil ====
Armourers adjusting a Grumman Hellcat's machine guns on board HMS Indomitable

On 4 January 1945, 5 Wing participated in Operation Lentil, an attack on the oil installations at Pangkalan Brandan. HMS Indomitable operated with HMS Victorious and the Implacable-class aircraft carrier HMS Indefatigable in the strike force, with 1839 and 1844 Squadrons providing Grumman Hellcat fighter cover for the attacking aircraft.

The operation was another component of the British Pacific Fleet's campaign against Japanese oil production in Sumatra. The Grumman Hellcats of 5 Wing were employed principally in the fighter-cover role while the carrier's Grumman Avengers conducted the principal bombing attack.

==== Operation Meridian ====
In January 1945, the British Pacific Fleet conducted Operation Meridian, a series of attacks against Japanese oil refineries around Palembang. HMS Indomitable, with 857, 1839 and 1844 Squadrons, formed part of the force employed in the operation. The first strike, Meridian One, was conducted against the oil installations at Plaju on 24 January, followed by Meridian Two against Sungei Gerong on 29 January.

The Grumman Hellcats of 5 Wing were employed in fighter escort and aerial reconnaissance tasks during the Palembang operations. Two aircraft from 1839 Squadron were subsequently fitted for photographic reconnaissance duties, extending the wing's employment beyond the conventional fighter-cover role.

==== Operation Iceberg ====
In March 1945 HMS Indomitable joined the British Pacific Fleet's operations in support of the American Tenth Army on Okinawa. The fleet operated as Task Force 57 under the operational control of the United States Fifth Fleet during Operation Iceberg. 5 Wing provided Grumman Hellcats for fleet and target combat air patrols, fighter escort and other offensive-support tasks.

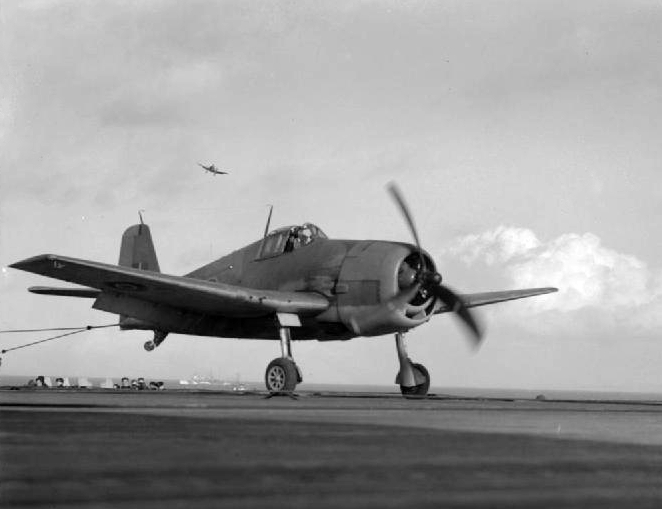
Grumman Hellcat landing on an aircraft carrier

The wing's performance during the Okinawa operations was specifically commended in the report of Admiral Sir Bruce Fraser. Fraser described the operational efficiency of 5 Wing, under Lieutenant Commander (A) T.W. Harrington, as having been remarkable throughout the operation, noting its ability to conduct day, night and all-weather flying and carrier landings under demanding conditions.

On 4 May, aircraft of 5 Wing participated in an engagement in which Sub-Lieutenant C.T. Batham of 1844 Squadron and Sub-Lieutenant R.E. Thomas of 1839 Squadron jointly shot down a Japanese fighter. The victory was recorded as a shared claim rather than as separate individual victories.

On 12 May, Lieutenant Commander M.S. Godson, commanding 1844 Squadron, was killed during an attack on Japanese anti-aircraft positions at Miyako-jima. His Grumman Hellcat was hit by anti-aircraft fire while attacking the Japanese positions and subsequently crashed.

During the later stages of the operation, 5 Wing continued to provide fighter and strike support. On 17 May the wing flew 43 sorties, comprising four strike sorties, 35 fleet combat air patrol sorties and four target combat air patrol sorties. On 24 May it flew 29 sorties, comprising four strike, one strike-reconnaissance, 16 fleet combat air patrol and eight target combat air patrol sorties. On 25 May it flew a further 38 sorties, including four strike, 32 fleet combat air patrol and two target combat air patrol sorties.

The wing remained operational until the end of the Okinawa campaign. Its squadrons disembarked from HMS Indomitable at RNAS Nowra (HMS Nabbington), New South Wales in Australia on 5 June 1945, while preparations were made for the reorganisation of the Fleet Air Arm's carrier aviation into Carrier Air Groups.

=== Disbandment ===
The 5th Naval Fighter Wing was disbanded on 30 June 1945. Its two constituent squadrons, 1839 and 1844 Naval Air Squadrons, were transferred into the newly formed 11th Carrier Air Group alongside 857 Naval Air Squadron. The change reflected the Admiralty's reorganisation of embarked naval aircraft from wings into carrier air groups.

The disbandment of 5 Wing did not mark the end of the two squadrons. Both continued as part of the 11th Carrier Air Group after June 1945 and remained associated with HMS Indomitable until their eventual disbandment in the United Kingdom on 30 November 1945.

== Squadrons ==
5th Naval Fighter Wing consisted of two Fleet Air Arm fighter squadrons during its existence:

- 1839 Naval Air Squadron, (1943 - 1945)
- 1844 Naval Air Squadron, (1943 - 1945)

== Naval air stations and carrier deployments ==
The 5th Naval Fighter Wing operated from Royal Naval Air Stations and other airfields in the United Kingdom, India, Ceylon and Australia during its formation, training and operational service. Its two constituent squadrons generally operated together, although they were temporarily based separately during the passage to the Eastern Fleet and during periods of training and reorganisation. The wing's principal carrier deployment was aboard HMS Indomitable.

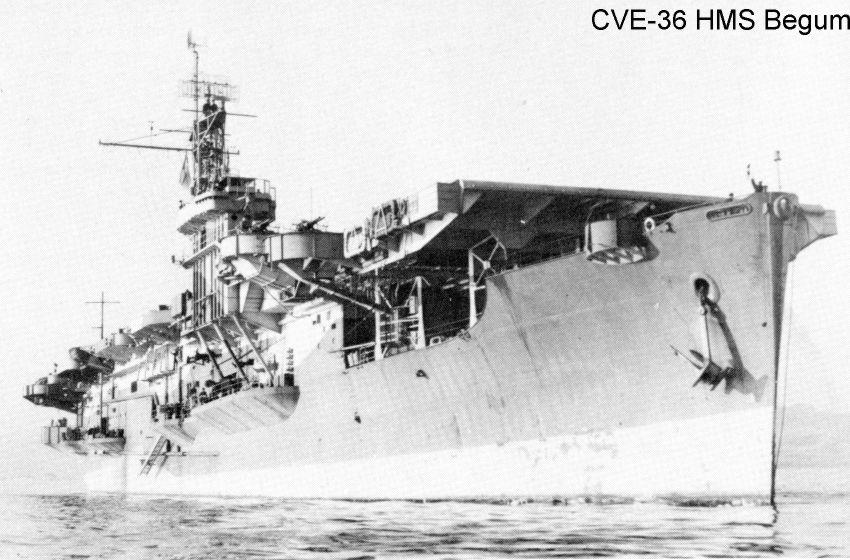
HMS Begum

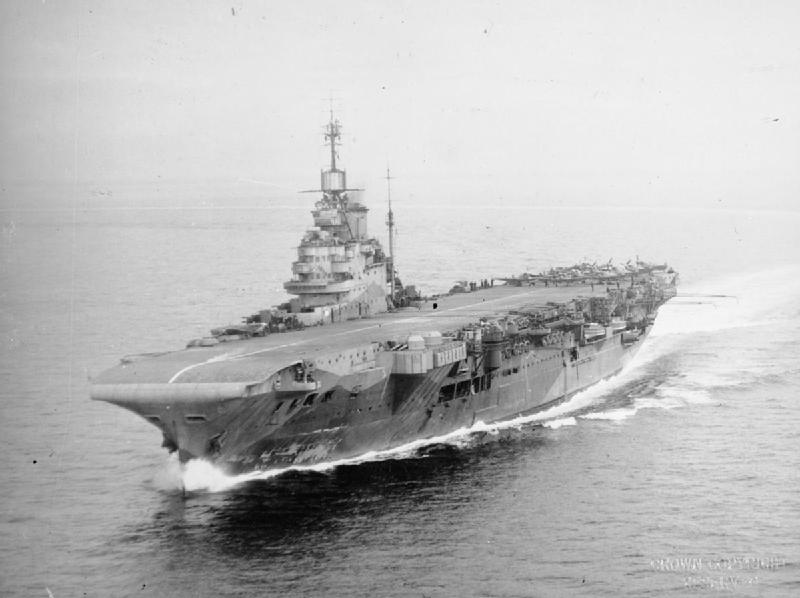
HMS Indomitable

- Royal Naval Air Station Eglinton (HMS Gannet), County Londonderry.
  - The wing was formed at RNAS Eglinton in December 1943 with 1839 Naval Air Squadron and 1844 Naval Air Squadron. Both squadrons conducted their initial work-up on Hellcat I aircraft at the station.
- Royal Naval Air Station Belfast (HMS Gadwall), County Antrim.
  - 1839 and 1844 Squadrons moved to RNAS Belfast on 25 February 1944 in preparation for embarkation in the escort carrier HMS Begum.
- HMS Begum
  - 1839 and 1844 Squadrons embarked in HMS Begum on 26 February 1944, each with ten Hellcat fighters. The carrier sailed from the Clyde on 3 March as part of the movement of Fleet Air Arm squadrons to the Eastern Fleet.
- Royal Naval Air Maintenance Yard Tambaram, India
  - HMS Begum arrived at Madras on 11 April 1944 and began disembarking her aircraft on 14 April. The aircraft of 1839 and 1844 Squadrons were transferred through RNAMY Tambaram before moving to RAF Ulunderpet for further training.
- RAF Ulunderpet, India.
  - 1839 and 1844 Squadrons were based at RAF Ulunderpet from 17 April 1944 while continuing their operational training. 1844 Squadron subsequently moved to Ceylon in June, while 1839 remained in India until later in the month.
- Royal Naval Air Station Colombo Racecourse (HMS Berhunda), Ceylon.
  - 1844 Squadron arrived at RNAS Colombo Racecourse on 7 June 1944. It subsequently moved to RN Air Section China Bay for deck-landing training before returning to RNAS Colombo Racecourse on 18 June. 1839 Squadron arrived at RNAS Colombo Racecourse on 23 June, bringing the two squadrons together again before their embarkation in HMS Indomitable.
- RN Air Section China Bay, Ceylon.
  - 1844 Squadron temporarily operated from RN Air Section China Bay, situated at RAF Chinas Bay in June 1944 and undertook deck landing training aboard the maintenance carrier HMS Unicorn on 14–15 June. The squadron returned to RNAS Colombo Racecourse on 18 June.
- HMS Indomitable
  - The 5th Naval Fighter Wing embarked in HMS Indomitable on 25 July 1944 for operational service with the Eastern Fleet. The wing remained embarked during operations in the Indian Ocean and against Japanese targets in Sumatra, disembarking to RN Air Section China Bay on 21 October.
- RN Air Section China Bay, Ceylon.
  - 1839 and 1844 Squadrons disembarked from HMS Indomitable at RN Air Section China Bay on 21 October 1944 following the Eastern Fleet operations. The wing remained ashore while HMS Indomitable was transferred to the newly established British Pacific Fleet.
- HMS Indomitable — British Pacific Fleet
  - 1839 and 1844 Squadrons re-embarked in HMS Indomitable on 1 December 1944 after 857 Naval Air Squadron had joined the carrier on 27 November. The wing subsequently remained embarked during Operation Robson, Operation Lentil and Operation Meridian, operating against Japanese oil installations in Sumatra.
- Royal Naval Air Station Nowra (HMS Nabbington), New South Wales.
  - 1839 and 1844 Squadrons were flown ashore to RNAS Nowra on 10 February 1945 while HMS Indomitable entered Sydney for replenishment and maintenance. The squadrons received replacement aircraft and aircrew and conducted further training before re-embarking in the carrier on 27 February.
- HMS Indomitable — British Pacific Fleet
  - 1839 and 1844 Squadrons re-embarked on 27 February 1945 and subsequently operated with the British Pacific Fleet during Operation Iceberg. The wing remained aboard HMS Indomitable until the squadrons were disembarked to RNAS Nowra on 5 June.
- Royal Naval Air Station Nowra (HMS Nabbington), New South Wales.
  - 1839 and 1844 Squadrons disembarked from HMS Indomitable to RNAS Nowra on 5 June 1945, as the carrier entered Sydney for repair and refit. The 5th Naval Fighter Wing was disbanded on 30 June, when the two squadrons became part of the newly established 11th Carrier Air Group.

By June 1945, the wing's operational history had therefore progressed from its formation and work-up at RNAS Eglinton, through its passage to the Eastern Fleet aboard HMS Begum, to its principal carrier deployment in HMS Indomitable. The wing's two squadrons subsequently continued at RNAS Nowra as components of the 11th Carrier Air Group after the wing itself was disbanded.

== Aircraft ==
The wing's two constituent squadrons operated with two variants of one fighter aircraft:

- Grumman Hellcat F. Mk. I fighter aircraft (1943 - 1945)
- Grumman Hellcat F. Mk. II fighter aircraft (1945)

== Wing leaders ==
The wing's recorded commanding officer chronology was:

- Commander H.P. Sears, RN, from 28 February 1944
- Commander T.G C. Jameson, RN, Senior Officer Air, from 7 April 1944
- Lieutenant Commander(A) T.W. Harrington, RN, from 9 September 1944

Harrington was the wing leader throughout the principal Eastern Fleet and British Pacific Fleet operational period. Fraser's report on the Okinawa operations specifically identifies him as the officer responsible for 5 Wing during Operation Iceberg.

Note: Abbreviation (A) signifies Air Branch of the RN or RNVR.

== See also ==
- Fleet Air Arm
- List of aircraft wings of the Royal Navy
- 1837 Naval Air Squadron
- 1844 Naval Air Squadron
- 11th Carrier Air Group
- HMS Indomitable
- Eastern Fleet
- British Pacific Fleet
