= 1839 Naval Air Squadron =

Inactive flying squadron of the Royal Navy's Fleet Air Arm

- Squadron badge
- Active: 1943–1945
- Disbanded: 30 November 1945
- Country: United Kingdom
- Branch: Royal Navy
- Type: Single-seat fighter squadron
- Role: Carrier-based fighter squadron
- Part of: Fleet Air Arm
- Home station: See Naval air stations section for full list.
- Engagements: World War II: Pacific War; Operation Banquet; Operation Light; Operation Millet; Operation Robson; Operation Lentil; Operation Meridian; Operation Iceberg
- Battle honours: East Indies 1944-45; Palembang 1945; Okinawa 1945

Insignia
- Squadron Badge Description: Red, an Indian tiger's head couped at the neck and inclined to profile proper (1945)
- Identification Markings: Single letters; 5A+ (by January 1944); R5A+ (August 1944); 111-126 (March 1945)
- Fin Carrier Code: W (March 1945)

Aircraft flown
- Fighter: Grumman Hellcat

1839 Naval Air Squadron (1839 NAS) was a Fleet Air Arm (FAA) naval air squadron of the United Kingdom's Royal Navy (RN). Established as a fighter squadron at HMS Gannet, RNAS Eglinton in Northern Ireland in November 1943, it formed part of the 5th Naval Fighter Wing. In February 1944, the squadron boarded HMS Begum and set sail for southern India, arriving in April. In June, it relocated to HMS Berhunda at RNAS Colombo Racecourse in Ceylon, and in July, it boarded HMS Indomitable, participating in attacks on Sumatra and conducting photographic reconnaissance.

The squadron resumed operations over Sumatra in December 1944 and January 1945, before the carrier became part of the British Pacific Fleet, where the squadron engaged in missions over Sakashima Gunto. In April 1945, it absorbed 1840 Naval Air Squadron, boosting its numbers. By June, the 5th NFW merged into the 11th Carrier Air Group. As the war concluded, the squadron was on the carrier ready for further missions, but the ship was redirected to Hong Kong. It was disbanded after the war in November 1945, upon returning to the UK.

== History ==
=== Single-seat fighter squadron (1943-1945) ===
1839 Naval Air Squadron was established as a single-seat fighter unit on 15 November 1943, at HMS Gannet, the Royal Naval Air Station located in Eglinton, County Londonderry, Northern Ireland. The squadron was commanded by Lieutenant Commander(A) D.M. Jeram, RN and was equipped with ten Grumman Hellcat fighter aircraft. These were the Royal Navy's equivalent of the United States Navy's F6F-3 variant, designated Hellcat F. Mk. I by the Fleet Air Arm.

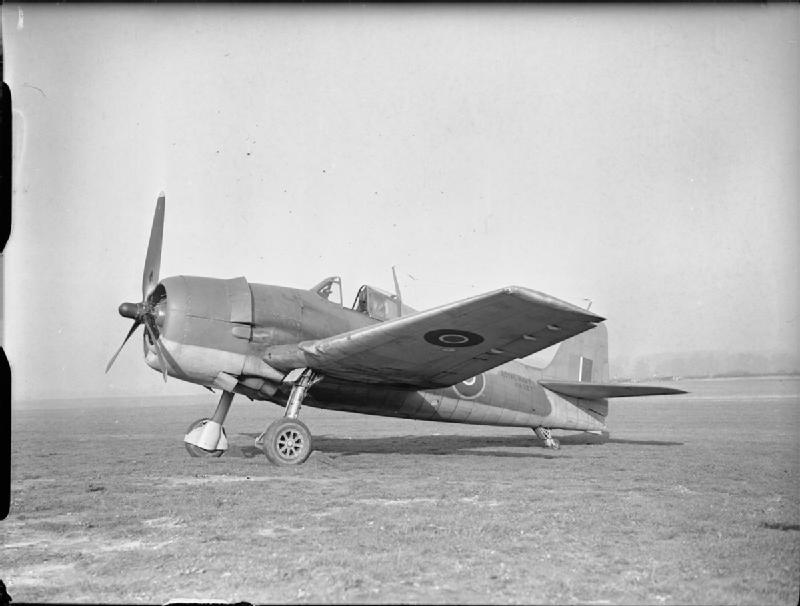
Grumman Hellcat; an example of the type used by 1839 NAS

In conjunction with 1844 Naval Air Squadron, they established the 5th Naval Fighter Wing (5 NFW) to operate aboard the Illustrious-class aircraft carrier, HMS Indomitable. Following an initial familiarisation with the aircraft and associated equipment, the squadron commenced rigorous training to ready themselves for active deployment. This training encompassed a variety of activities, including navigation drills, low-altitude flying, formation manoeuvres, and air combat manoeuvring.

On 26 February, the Ruler-class escort carrier HMS Begum commenced the embarkation of four squadrons for deployment to the Far East. The initial personnel and ten Grumman Hellcat fighter aircraft from 1839 Naval Air Squadron were the first to board. The vessel departed from the River Clyde on 3 March, participating in Convoy KMF.29A, which was en route to Alexandria, Egypt. After reaching Madras Harbour, India, on 11 April, unloading operations began on 14 March, with the squadron being transferred to the aircraft maintenance yard RNAS Tambaram (HMS Valluru); 1839 Naval Air Squadron was ultimately assigned to RAF Ulunderpet.

On 23, the squadron set off for RNAS Colombo Racecourse (HMS Berhunda), Ceylon and a month later, on July 25th, the 5th Naval Fighter Wing embarked on HMS Indomitable to begin its operational duties. The wing utilised the Royal Navy Air Section at RAF China Bay, Ceylon and RNAS Nowra (HMS Nabbington), MONAB I, in New South Wales, Australia, as its shore bases.

In July, the squadron conducted offensive operations against Sumatra as a component of Operation Banquet, while also engaging in photographic reconnaissance activities during Operation Light. The squadron resumed its operations over Sumatra in December 1944 and January 1945 participating in Operations Millet, Robson, Lentil and Meridian. The aircraft carrier subsequently became part of the British Pacific Fleet, redirecting its focus towards objectives within the Sakishima Gunto archipelago located in the East China Seas, in alignment with Operation Iceberg.

On 27 April 1945, the squadron absorbed 1840 Naval Air Squadron, increasing its total number of aircraft to eighteen. Subsequently, in June 1945, the 5th Naval Fighter Wing was dissolved and incorporated into the 11th Carrier Air Group (11 CAG), which included 1844 Naval Air Squadron from the Wing, and along with 857 Naval Air Squadron. The Admiralty had decided to move to the American system of all ships squadrons under a single Carrier Air Group (CAG).

In early August, 1839 Naval Air Squadron re-embarked for additional operations. However, the occurrence of V-J Day altered these plans, leading the aircraft carrier to set course for Hong Kong instead. Upon its return to Australia in October, the aircraft were withdrawn and the ship subsequently departed for the United Kingdom, where the squadron was officially disbanded upon arrival on 30 November.

== Aircraft flown ==
1839 Naval Air Squadron flew two variants of only one aircraft type:

- Grumman Hellcat F. Mk. I fighter aircraft (November 1943 - October 1945)
- Grumman Hellcat F. Mk. II fighter aircraft (March - October 1945)

== Battle honours ==
The following Battle Honours have been awarded to 1839 Naval Air Squadron:

- East Indies 1944-45
- Palembang 1945
- Okinawa 1945

== Assignments ==
1839 Naval Air Squadron was assigned as needed to form part of a number of larger units:

- 5th Naval Fighter Wing (December 1943 - 30 June 1945)
- 11th Carrier Air Group (30 June - 30 November 1945)

== Naval air stations ==
1839 Naval Air Squadron operated mostly from a number of naval air stations of the Royal Navy overseas, a Royal Navy fleet carrier and a couple of escort carriers:

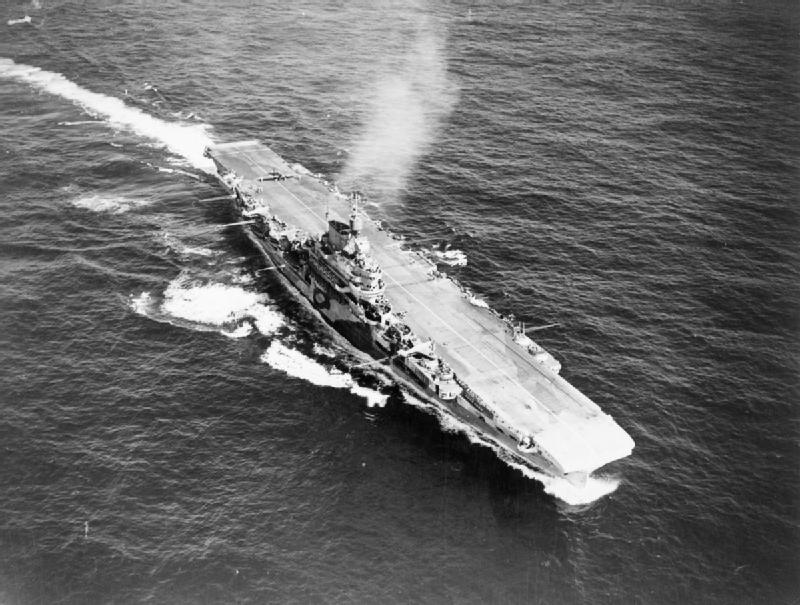
HMS Indomitable

- Royal Naval Air Station Eglinton (HMS Gannet), County Londonderry, (15 November 1943 - 26 February 1944)
- HMS Begum (26 February - 10 April 1944)
- Royal Air Force Ulunderpet, India, (10 April - 12 June 1944)
- RN Air Section China Bay, Ceylon, (12 - 23 June 1944)
  - HMS Unicorn (Deck Landing Training (DLT) 14 - 16 June 1944)
- Royal Naval Air Station Colombo Racecourse (HMS Berhunda), Ceylon, (23 June - 25 July 1944)
- HMS Indomitable (25 July - 21 October 1944)
- RN Air Section China Bay, Ceylon, (21 October - 1 December 1944)
- HMS Indomitable (1 - 3 December 1944)
- RN Air Section China Bay, Ceylon, (3 - 17 December 1944)
- HMS Indomitable (17 December 1944 - 10 February 1945)
- Royal Naval Air Station Nowra (HMS Nabbington), New South Wales, (10 - 27 February 1945)
- HMS Indomitable (27 February - 4 June 1945)
- Royal Naval Air Station Nowra (HMS Nabbington), New South Wales, (4 June - 3 August 1945)
- HMS Indomitable (3 August - 11 October 1945)
- Royal Naval Air Station Nowra (HMS Nabbington), New South Wales, (11 - 22 October 1945)
- HMS Indomitable (crews) (22 October - 30 November 1945)
- disbanded UK - (30 November 1945)

== Commanding officers ==
List of commanding officers of 1839 Naval Air Squadron with date of appointment:

- Lieutenant Commander(A) D.M. Jeram, RN, from 15 November 1943
- Lieutenant Commander S.F.F. Shotton, DSC, RNR, from 8 September 1944
- Lieutenant Commander(A) B.H.C. Nation, RN, from 26 April 1945
- disbanded - 30 November 1945

Note: Abbreviation (A) signifies Air Branch of the RN or RNVR.
