= List of Fleet Air Arm aircraft in World War II =

This list deals specifically with aircraft of the Royal Navy's Fleet Air Arm (FAA) during World War II.

The FAA operated aircraft from Royal Navy ships, mainly aircraft carriers but also including capital ships and cruisers, as well as from land bases defending ports and attacking enemy shipping.

== Carrier aircraft of World War II ==
=== Fighters ===
Gloster Sea Gladiator
Carrier-borne version of the Gladiator fitted with an arrestor hook. One of the two FAA fighters of World War II in service at the beginning alongside the Blackburn Skua.

Blackburn Skua
The Skua was a fighter and a dive bomber; one of two fighter aircraft in the FAA at the onset of war, alongside the Gloster Sea Gladiator. Armed with four fixed forward-firing machine-guns in the wings and a single flexibly-mounted Vickers K machine gun in the rear cockpit, the Skua carried a large bomb launched from a swivelling crutch under the centre fuselage.

Blackburn Roc
The Roc was the turret-armed escort-fighter derived from the Skua, fitted with a four-gun hydraulically-operated turret aft of the cockpit, similar to the Boulton Paul Defiant. The Roc was not procured in large numbers, due to low speed.

Fairey Fulmar
The Fulmar fighter/reconnaissance aircraft was introduced into service in May 1940 and was the first FAA fighter to have eight machine-guns and also had carried a Navigator/Observer/Gunner to assist the pilot with navigation, reconnaissance and defence.

Hawker Sea Hurricane
Carrier-borne and catapult-ship variants of the Hurricane introduced to service in 1941. All Sea Hurricanes, apart from the IA, were carrier-capable, being fitted with arrestor hooks.

Grumman Martlet (later Wildcat)
The Martlet was a carrier fighter, armed with four 0.5 inch M2 Browning heavy machine guns, in widespread use from September 1941. The Martlet was the British name for Grumman G-36A and G-36B aircraft in British service. Later in the war new acquisitions (FM-1 and FM-2) used the US Wildcat name.

Supermarine Spitfire
The Spitfire was used by land-based squadrons.

Supermarine Seafire
A navalised version of the Spitfire which entered service in November 1942.
Vought F4U Corsair
The Corsair was used by the FAA from November 1943, with modifications to suit them to service on British carriers.

Grumman Hellcat
Hellcat was a more developed aircraft than Wildcat, armed with six 0.5 inch M2 Browning heavy machine guns. It entered widespread service with FAA in early 1944 under the US Hellcat name. Was used in both Europe and the Mediterranean.
Fairey Firefly
The Firefly was the last FAA carrier-fighter put into service in World War II, in July 1944, as a reconnaissance and strike fighter.

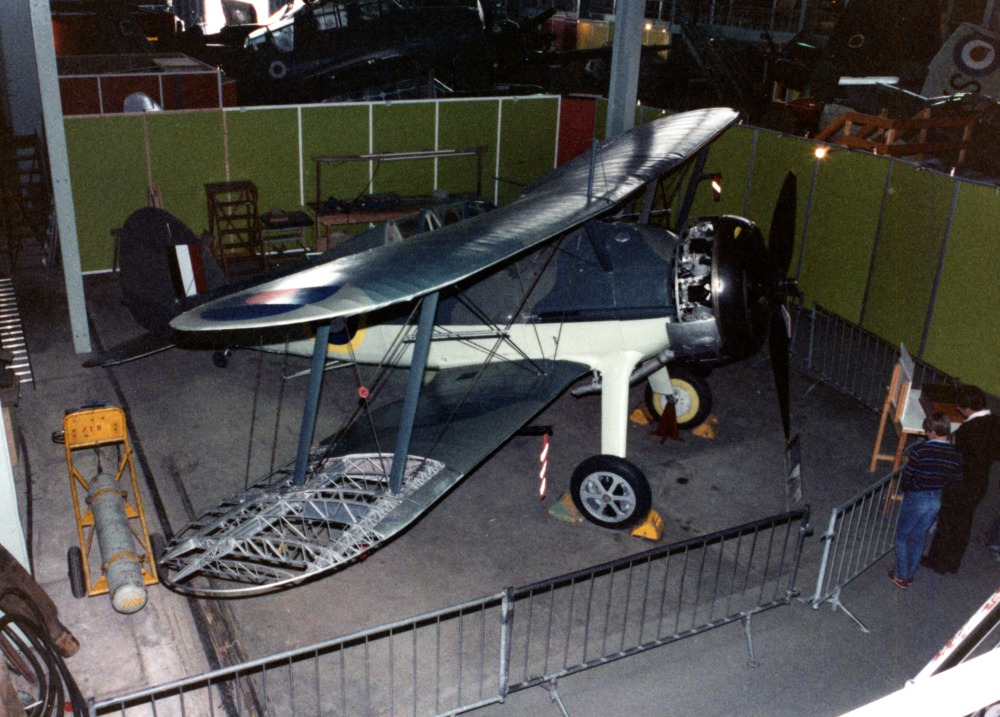
Gloster Sea Gladiator

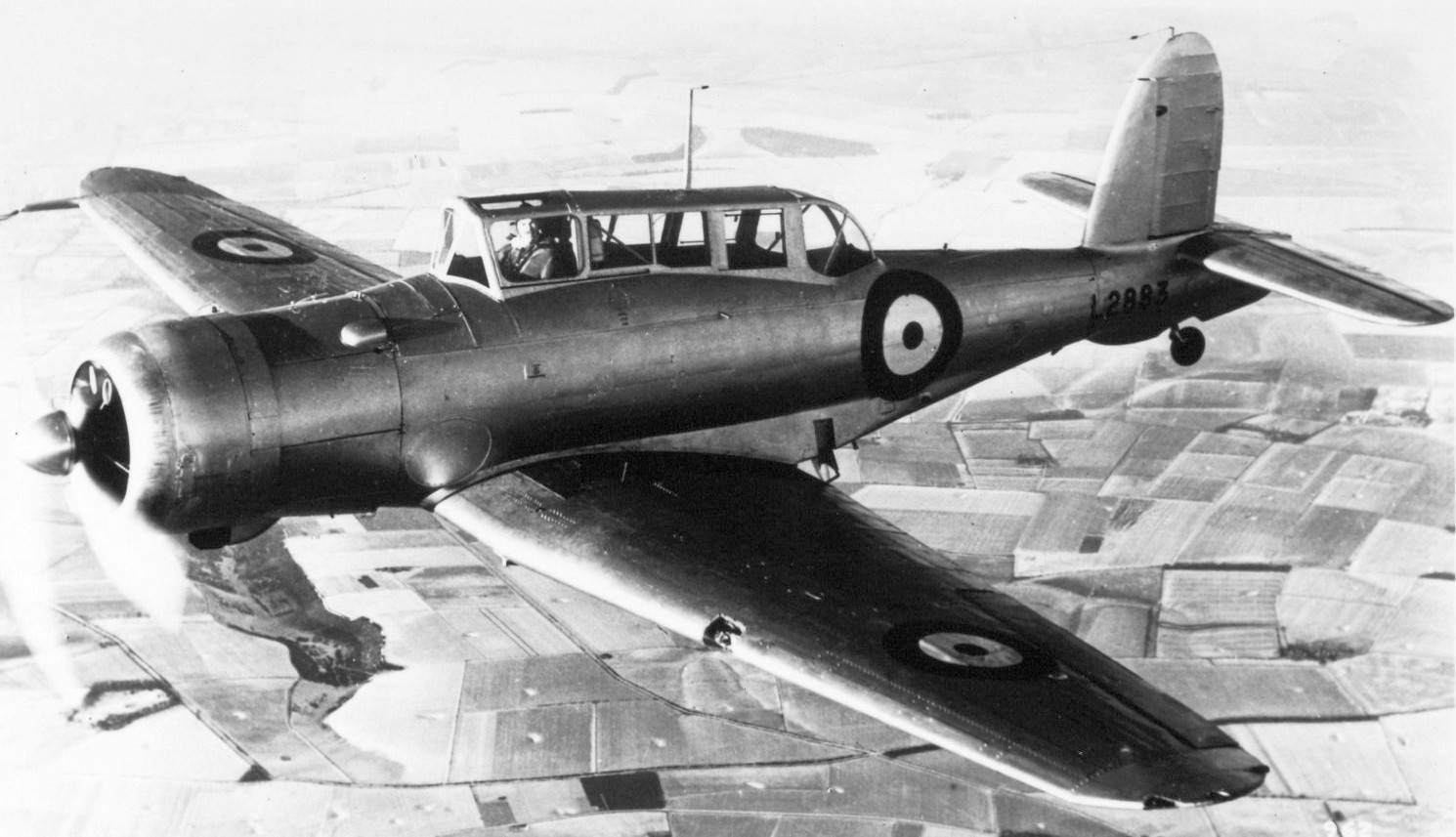
Blackburn Skua

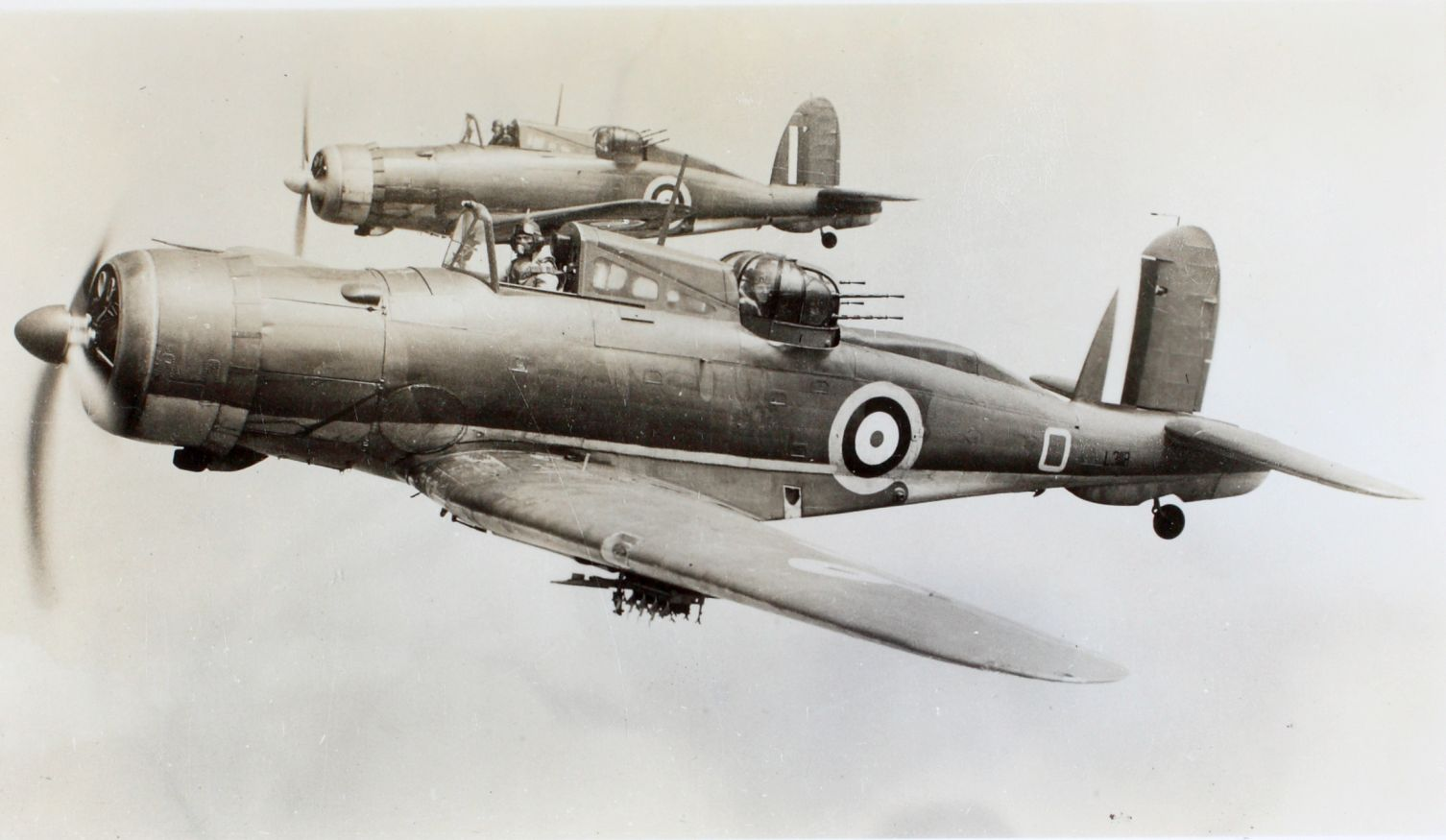
Blackburn Roc

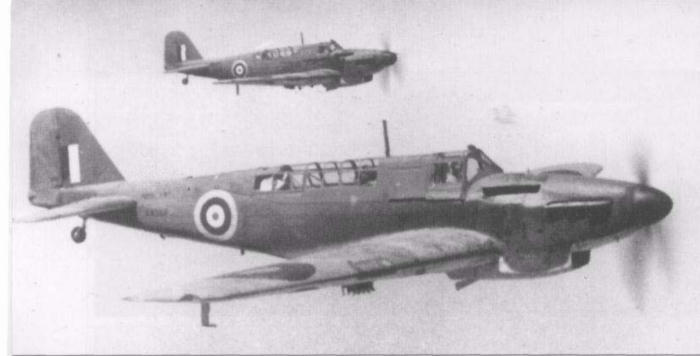
Fairey Fulmar

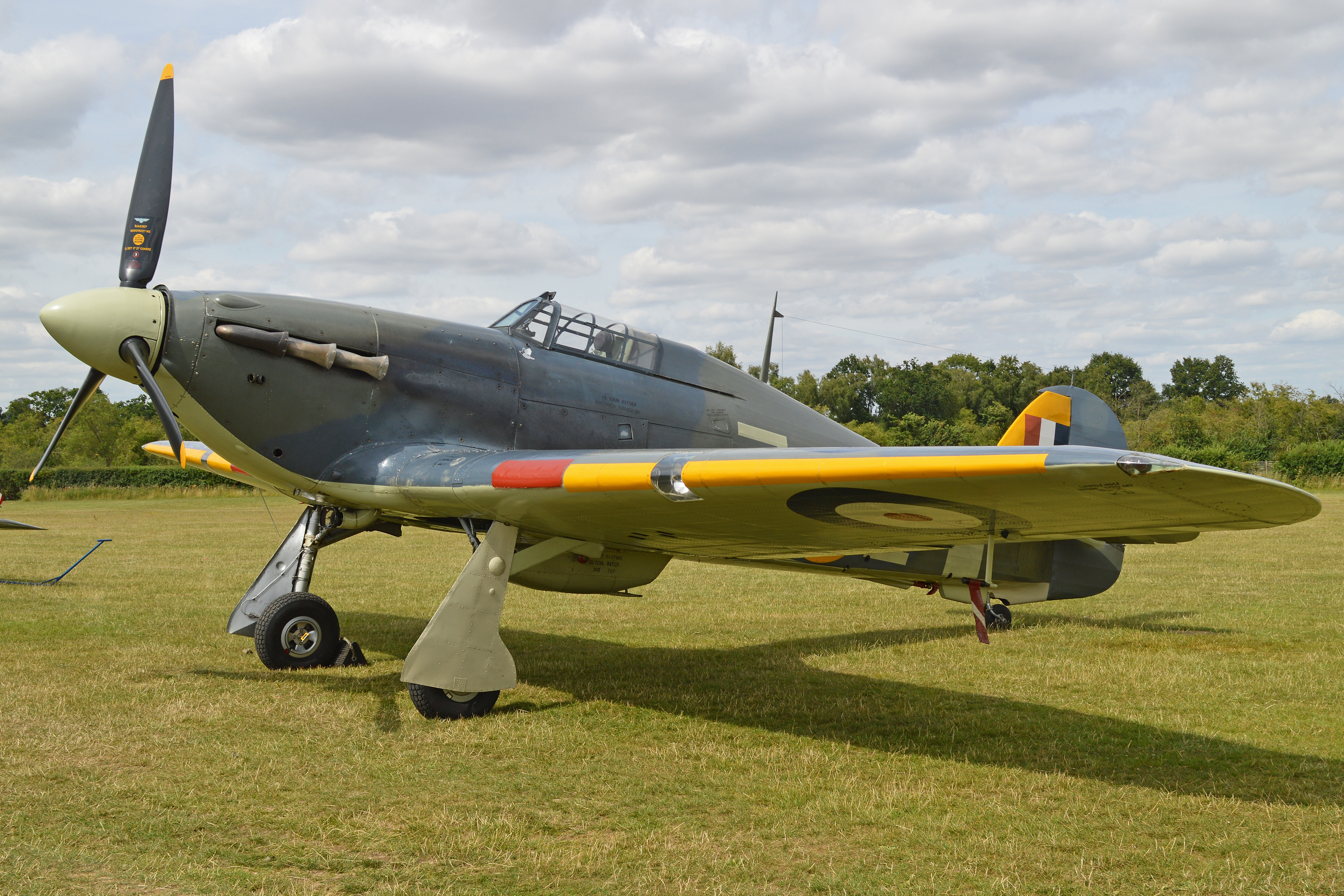
Hawker Sea Hurricane IB.

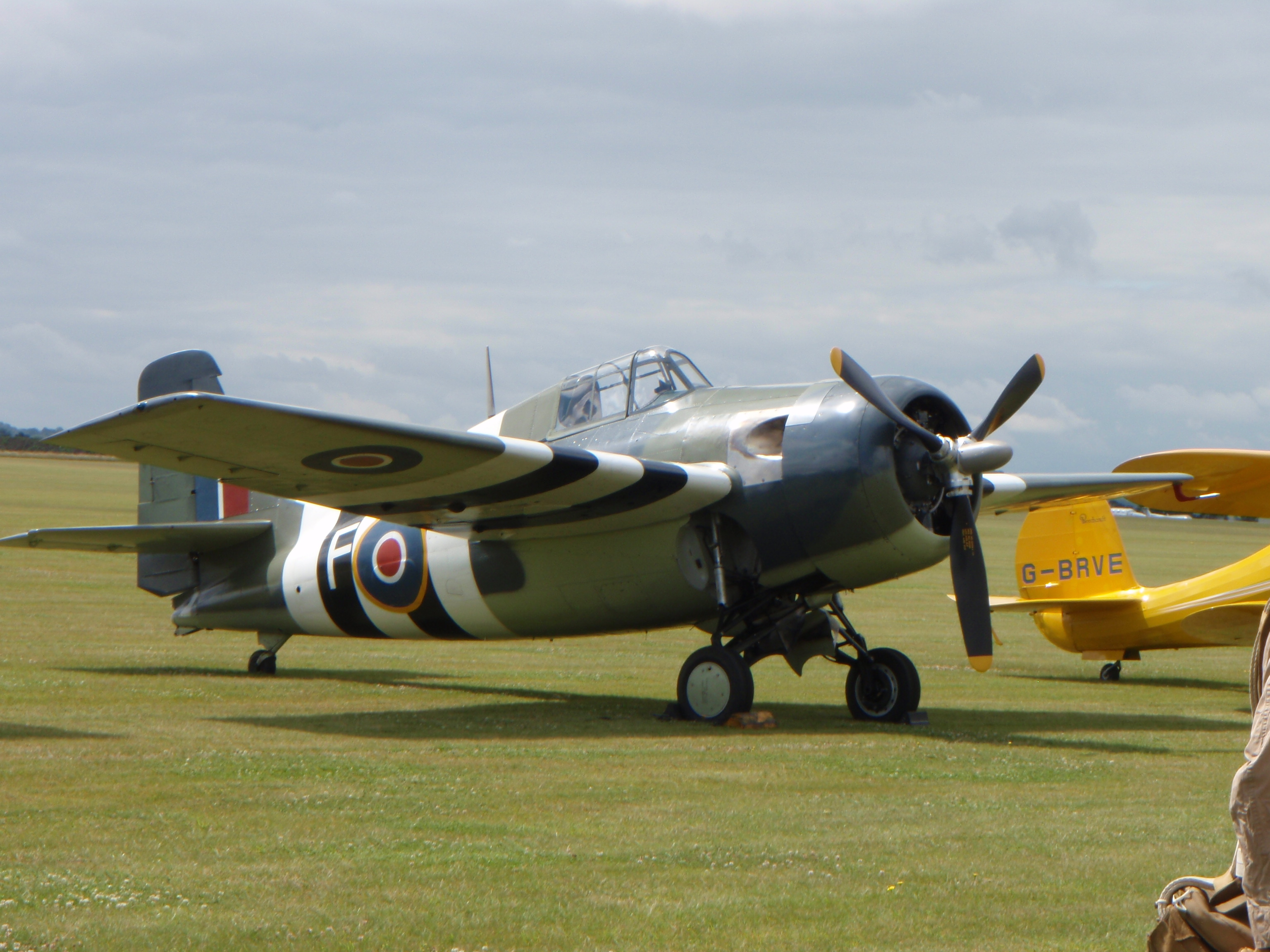
FAA Grumman Wildcat/Martlet

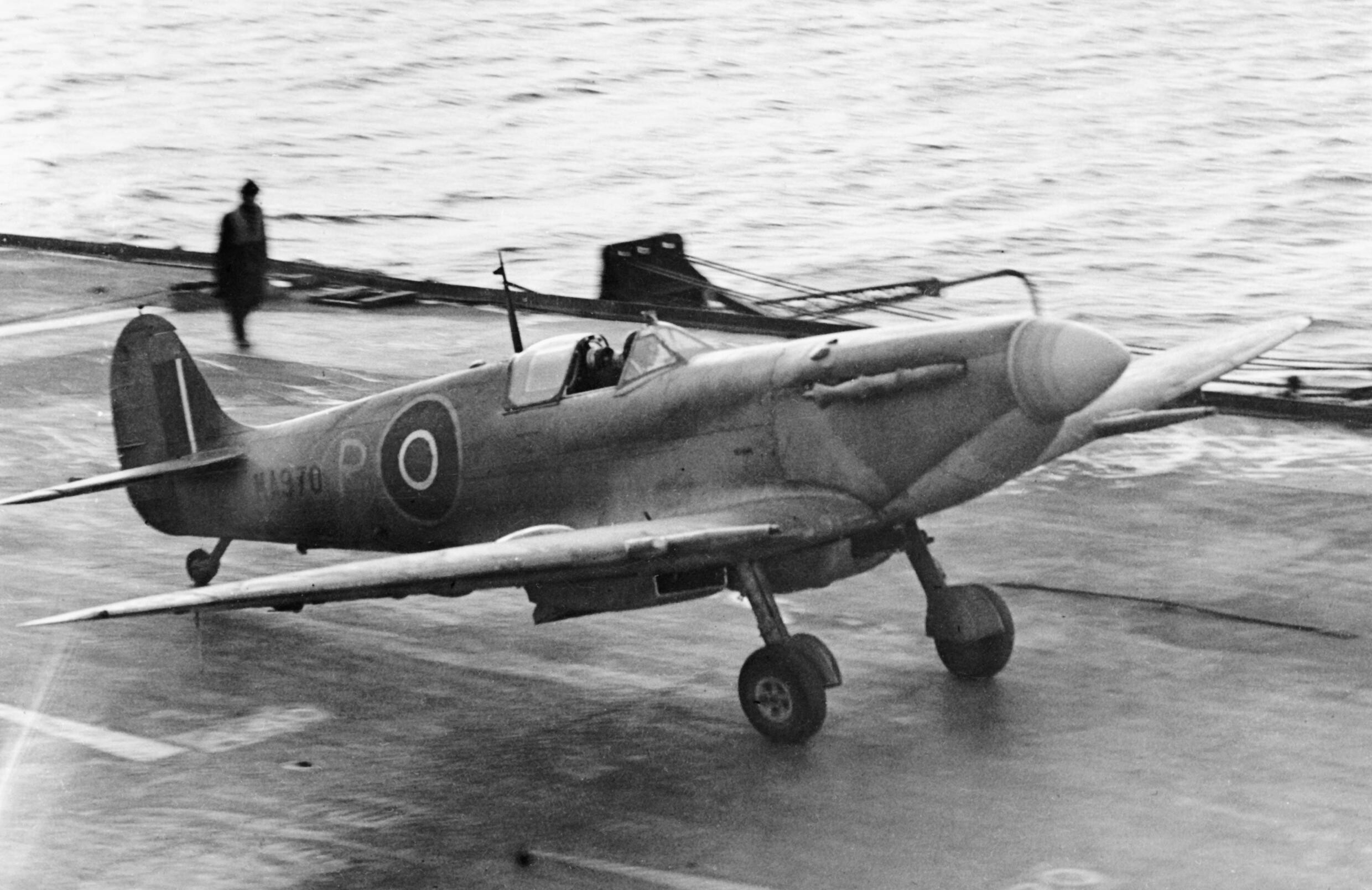
Supermarine Seafire

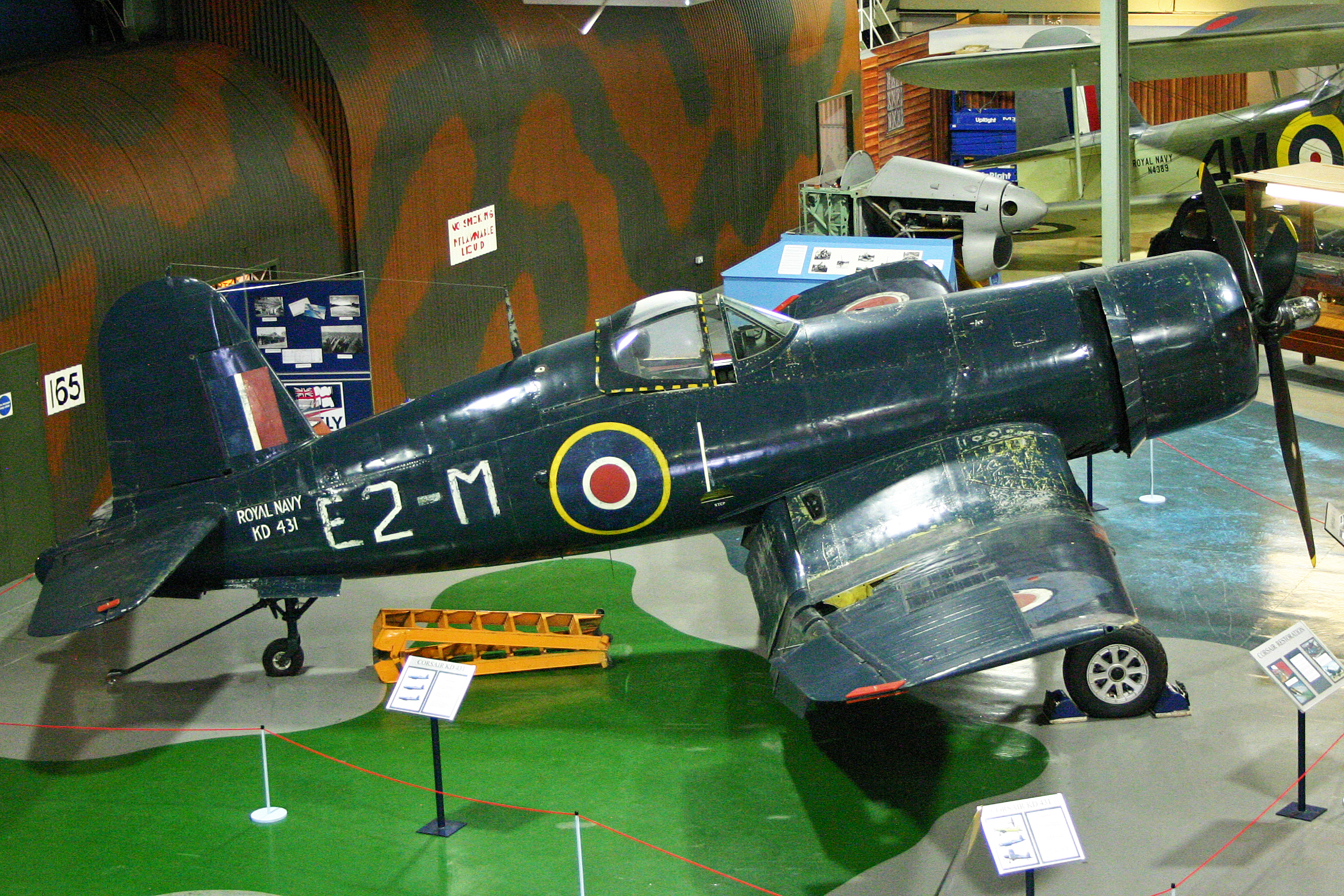
FAA Vought Corsair

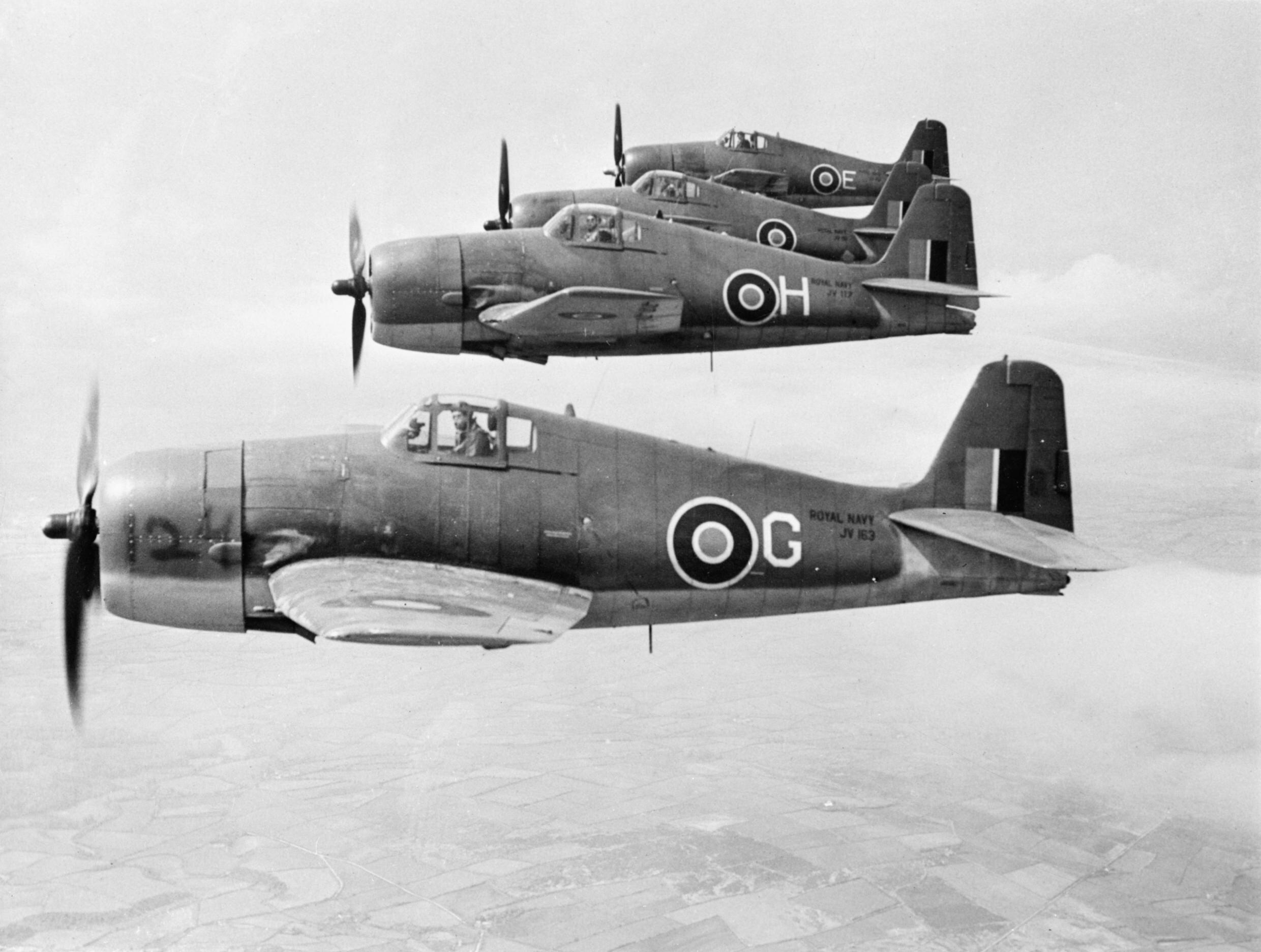
Hellcats of 1840 Naval Air Squadron FAA.

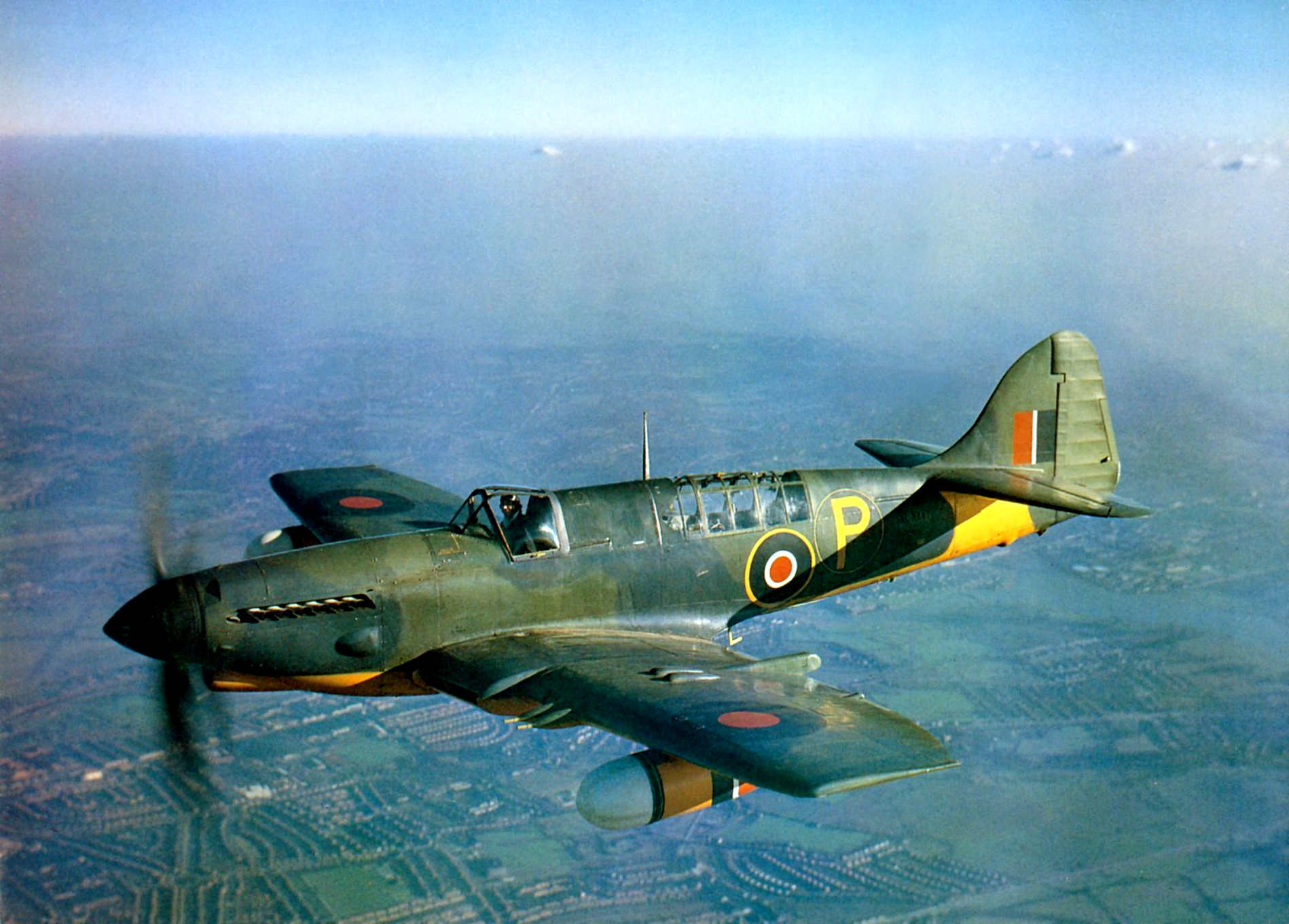
Fairey Firefly FR.IV 1944

=== Torpedo bombers ===
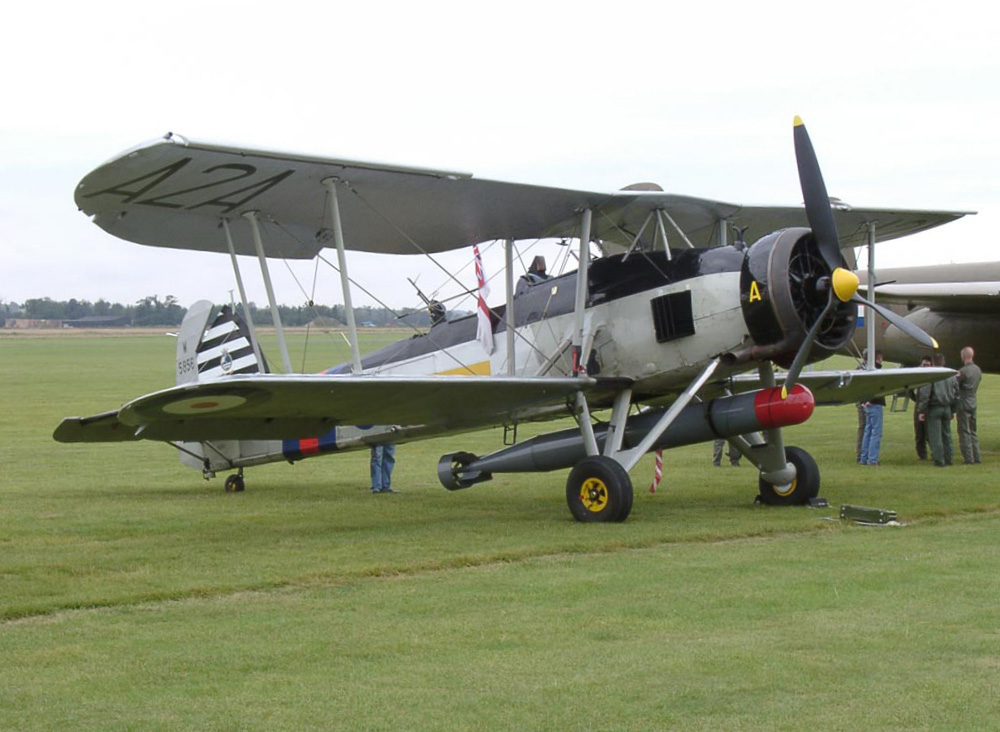
Fairey Swordfish with torpedo

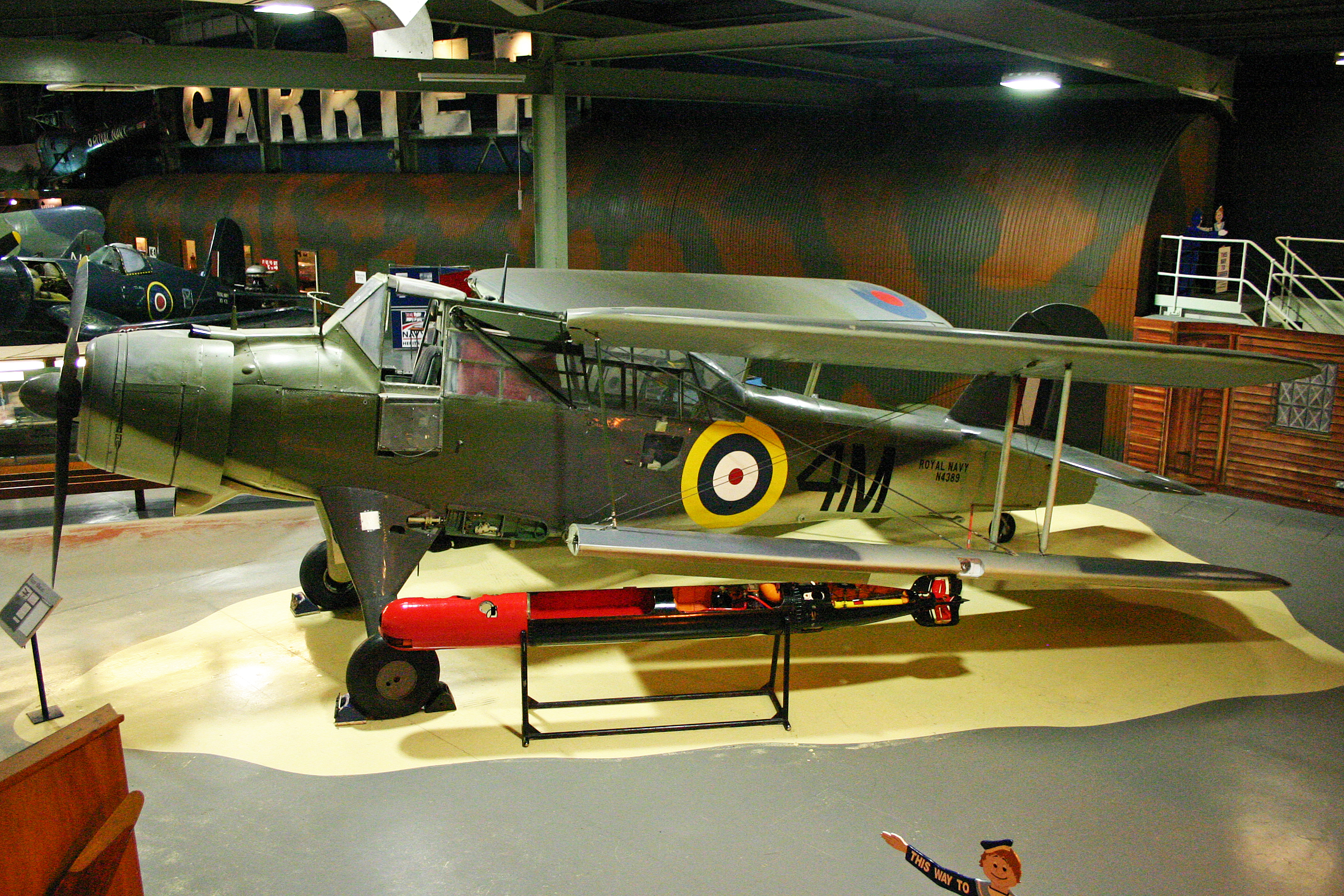
Fairey Albacore and torpedo at the Fleet Air Arm Musuem

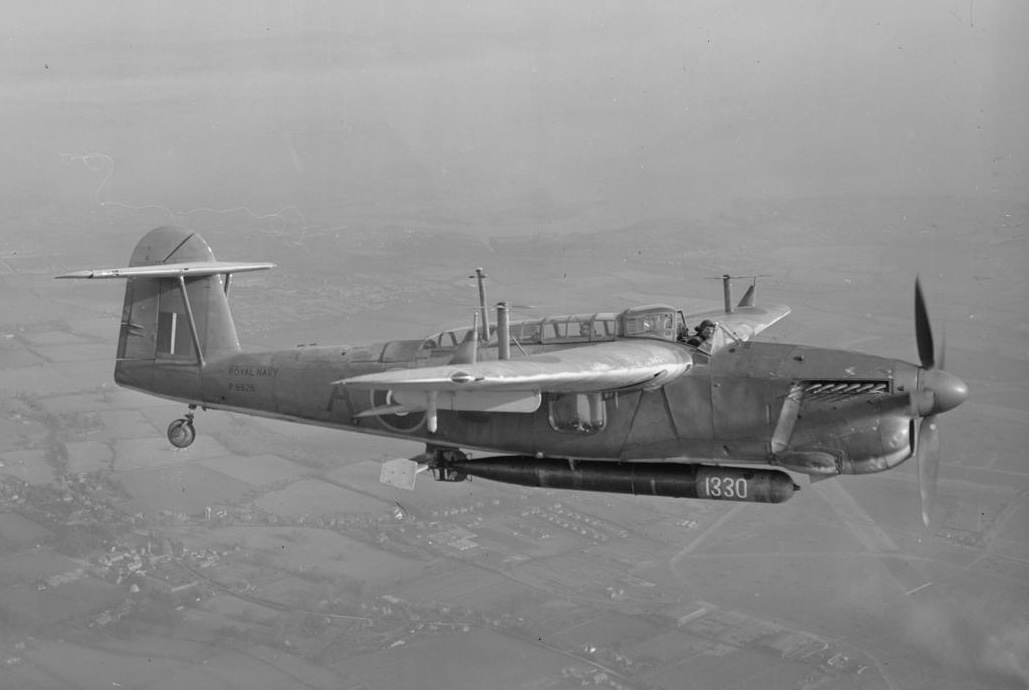
Fairey Barracuda with a Torpedo in flight

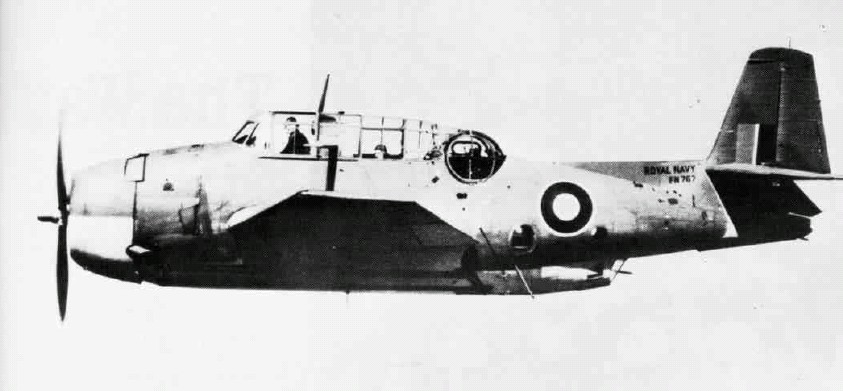
Side view of FAA Grumman Avenger

Fairey Swordfish

The Fairey Swordfish was the FAA's Torpedo bomber at the start of the war and probably the FAA’s most famous aircraft. It also was designed for reconnaissance/spotting and later in the war it was replaced in the frontline torpedo role and given anti-submarine duties from escort carriers.

Fairey Albacore

The Fairey Albacore was intended as a replacement for the Swordfish fulfilling the same roles with an improved engine and enclosed cabin. Went into service in 1940-1943 but was replaced by the Barracuda before the end of the war.

Fairey Barracuda An all metal monoplane torpedo-bomber/dive bomber, the Barracude was the last British torpedo bomber to enter service during the war, serving from January 1943.

Grumman Avenger

This aircraft came into service by the FAA in November 1943. Was originally called Tarpon but was changed to Avenger when the FAA changed to using the US names.

=== Dive bombers ===
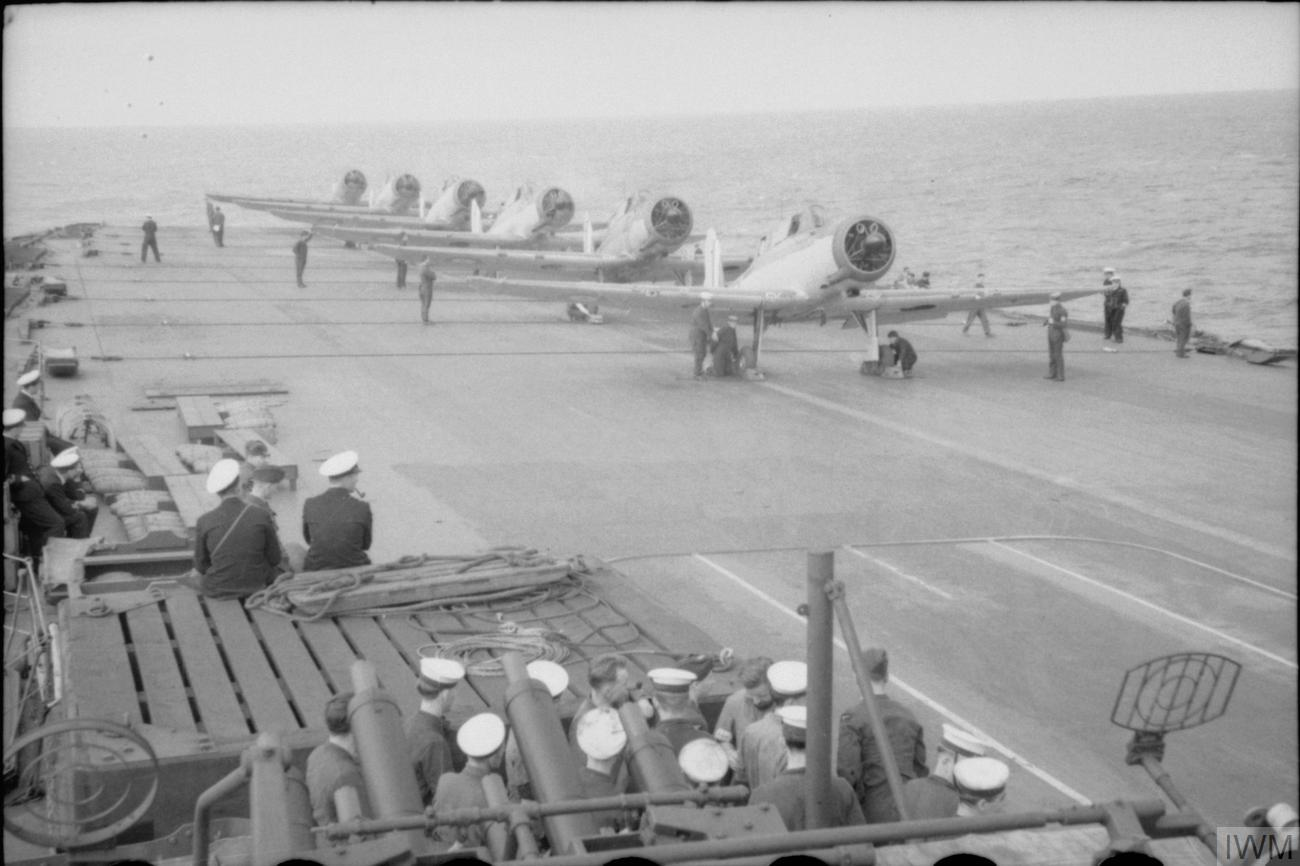
Skuas just about to take off from the aircraft carrier HMS Ark Royal (91)

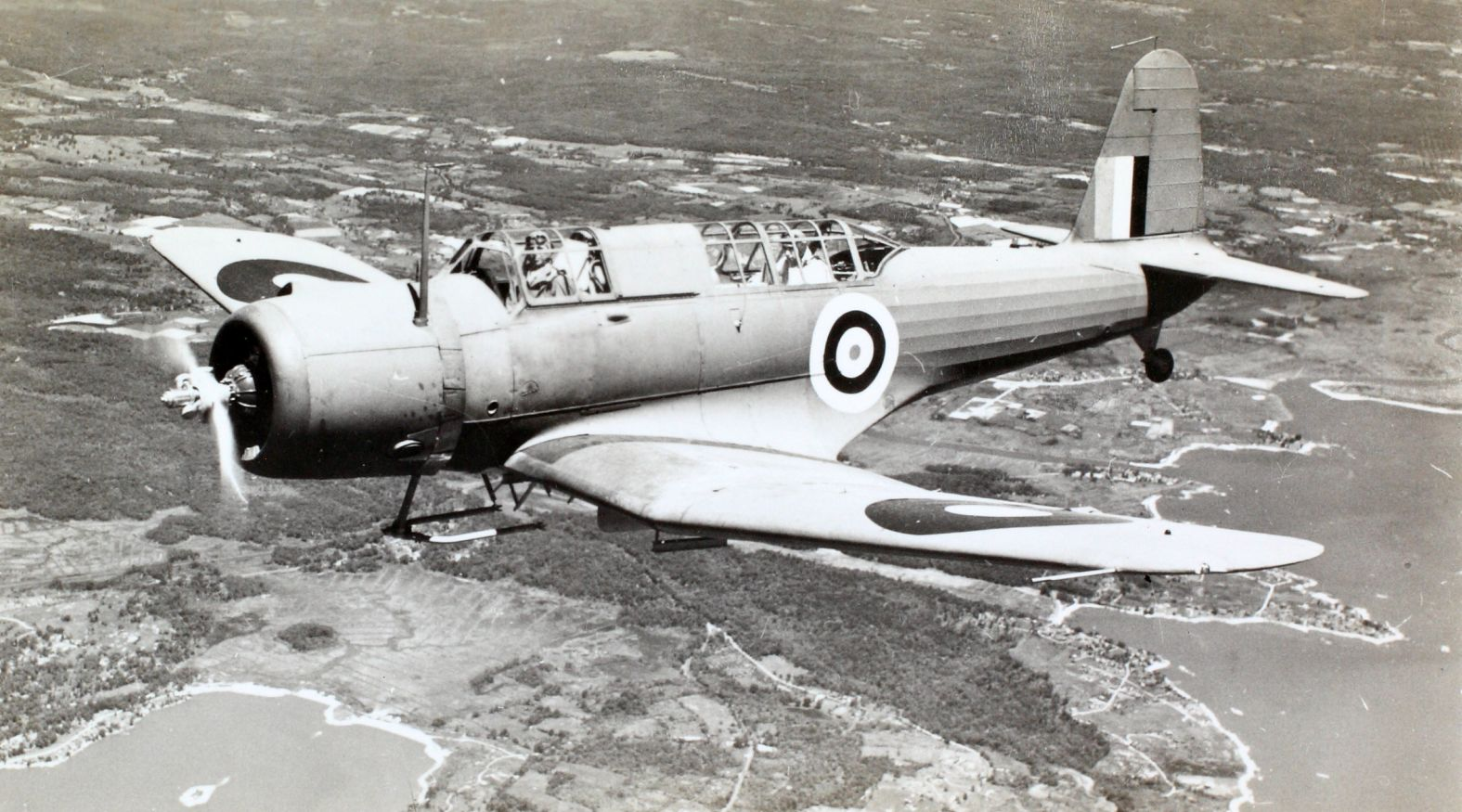
Vought Vindicator

All FAA torpedo bombers except the Grumman Avenger could also act as dive bombers

Blackburn Skua

Combined fighter and dive bomber -the Skua could carry a single 250lb or 500 lb. bomb under the fuselage and four 40lb bombs or eight 20lb Cooper bombs under the wings.

Vought Chesapeake

The British took over French order for 50 Vought Vindicators after the Battle of France. Modified for British requirements, they were given the service name "Chesapeake". After brief service with 811 Naval Air Squadron in 1941 they were withdrawn from frontline and used for training.

=== Reconnaissance ===
Reconnaissance came from planes that had been designed to undertake this role as well as an offensive role such as a fighter or bomber:

Fairey Swordfish
When carried, the observer was the third crewmember in addition to the pilot and "Telegraphist/Air gunner"
Fairey Albacore
The Albacore was designed as a torpedo/bomber/reconnaissance aircraft. For reconnaissance operations, a third crewmember was carried.
Fairey Fulmar
Introduced in 1940.
Fairey Firefly
The successor to the Fairey Fulmar entering service in 1944 initially for armed reconnaissance flights and anti-shipping strikes. The observer was seated in the rear of the fuselage.

=== Anti-submarine ===
Fairey Swordfish
The Swordfish in later life served as anti-submarine aircraft operating off escort carriers in convoys. To fulfill this role the Swordfish Mark II was fitted with ASV Mark II radar, the first instance of a carrier aircraft equipped with air-to-surface-vessel (ASV) radar, and RP-3 rockets. The Swordfish Kk III received the more advanced centimetric ASV Mk XI radar. This was used to destroy German midget submarine.
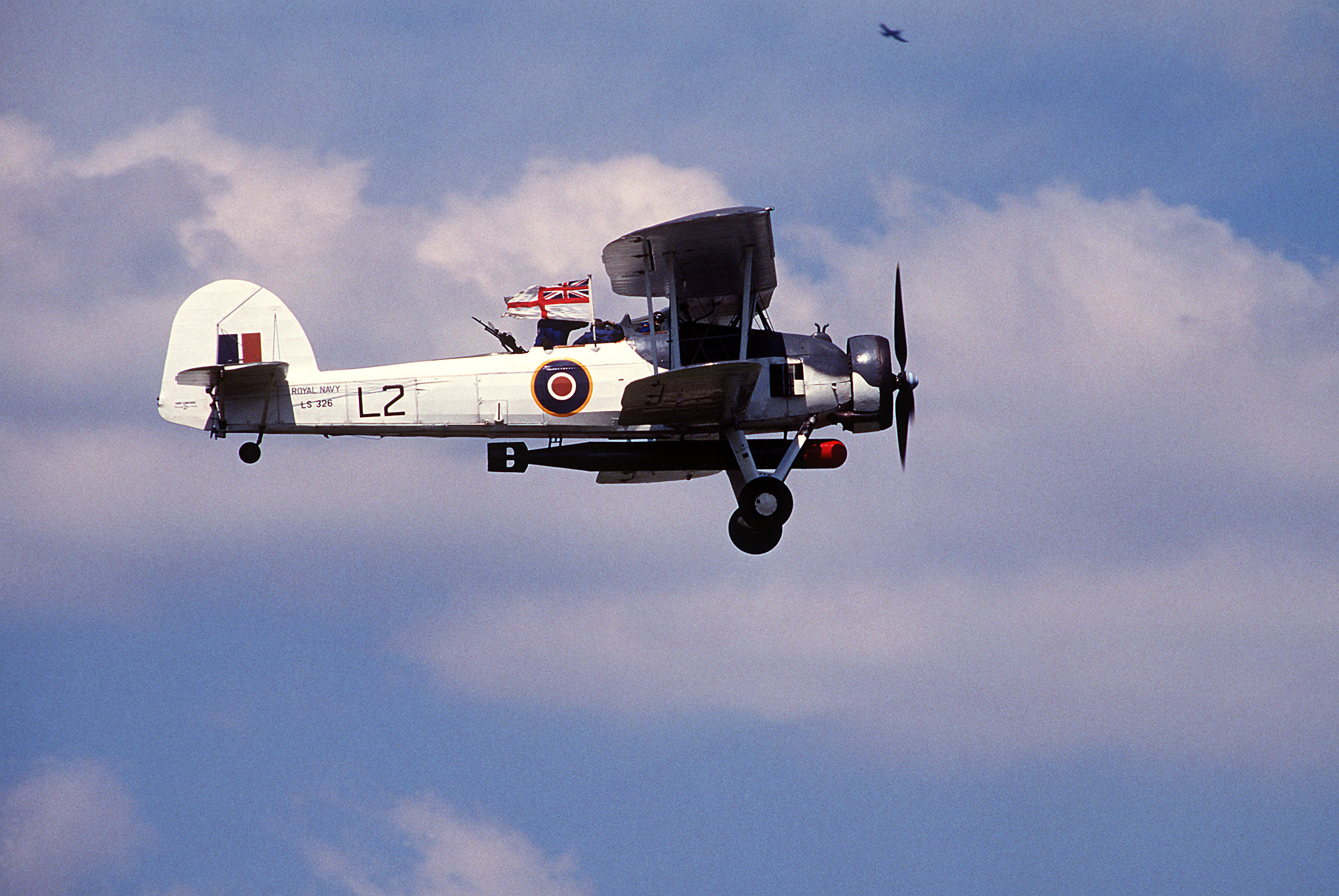
Swordfish mk II in flight with torpedo

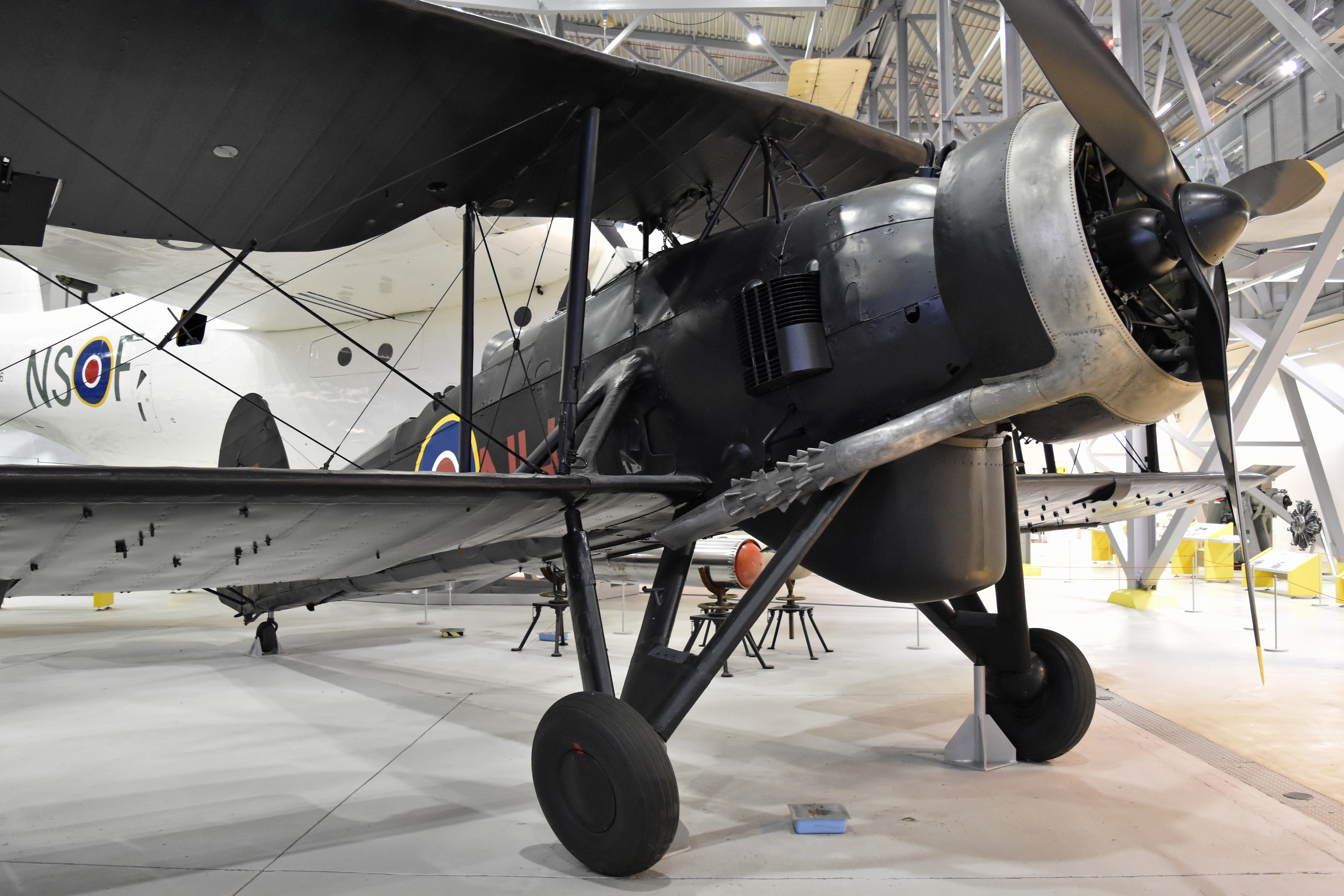
the AS/V radar on the Swordfish was fitted below the fuselage

=== Other ===
Hawker Osprey

Training after withdrawal as carrier fighter.

== Non-carrier shipborne aircraft ==
=== Fighters ===
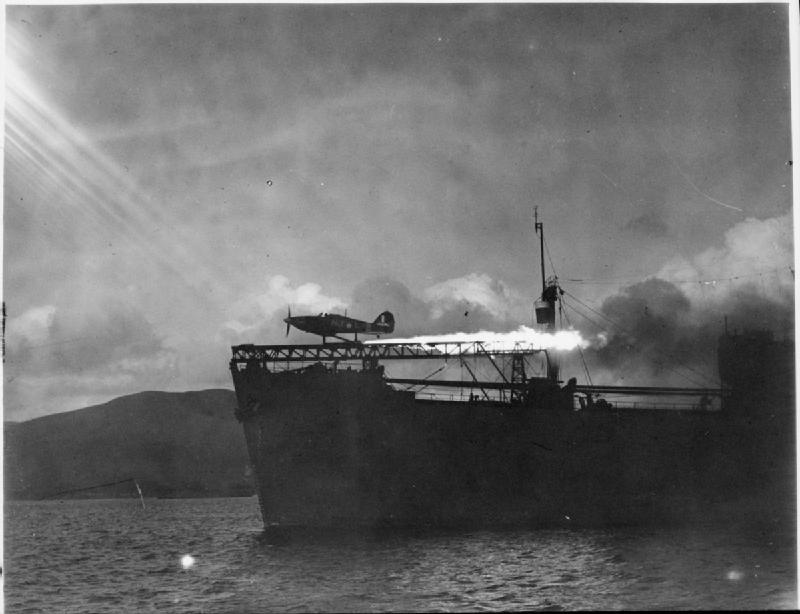
CAM ships launched their fighters, in this case a Sea Hurricane, with a rocket-powered catapult

Sea Hurricane IA

The Sea Hurricane mk IA was a catapult only aircraft that was carried and launched from CAM ships. These ships only had the facilities to launch the aircraft so that if no land bases were available nearby the pilot was forced to ditch the aircraft in the sea when fuel ran out.

=== Reconnaissance & ship artillery spotters ===
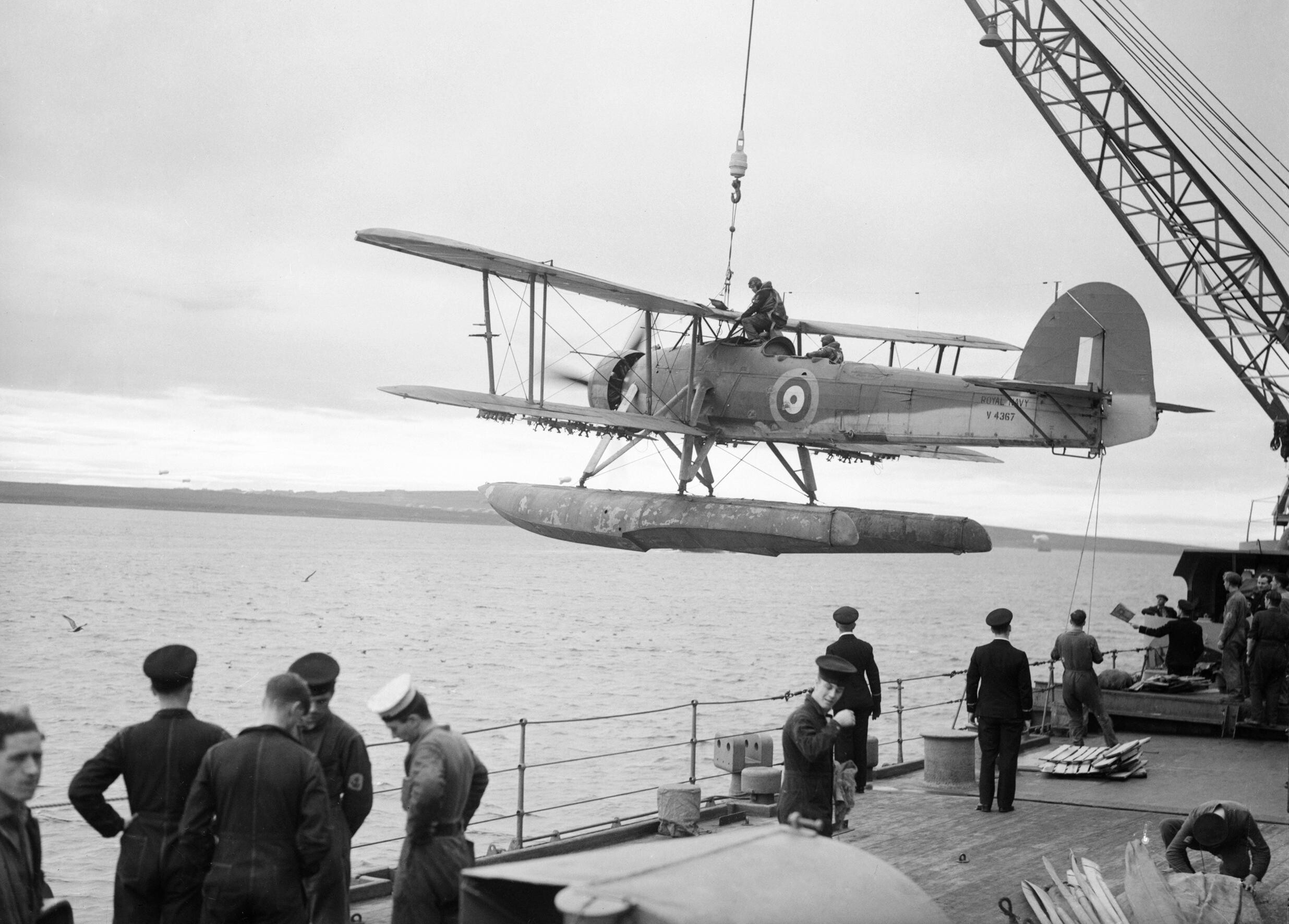
Fairey Swordfish floatplane is recovered aboard the battleship Malaya after reconnaissance flight in 1941

Fairey Swordfish

The Fairey Swordfish was deployed from normal Royal Navy ships with floats through an aircraft catapult on board the ship in order to do recon or act as an artillery spotter for the ship. Artillery spotting involved the Swordfish tracking the fall of shot from its ship and relaying back where it landed to help its ship make adjustments to their guns aim to be more accurate.

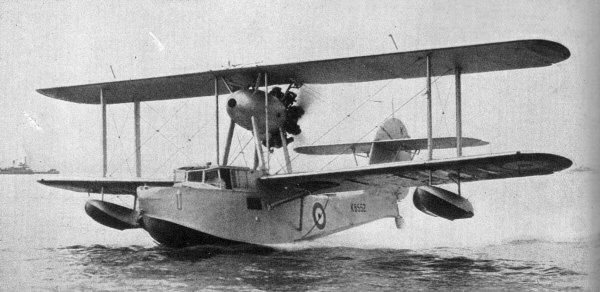
Supermarine Walrus

Supermarine Walrus

The Supermarine Walrus was a seaplane designed to be operated off battleships and cruiser for reconnaissance and as a spotter for the main armament. There were only two occasions on which it was used as a spotter but it was used for reconnaissance and air sea rescue throughout the war. With improvements in radar it was removed from some of the capital ships as it was rendered obsolete in its other role in patrolling for axis subs with ASV radar

== Land-based aircraft ==
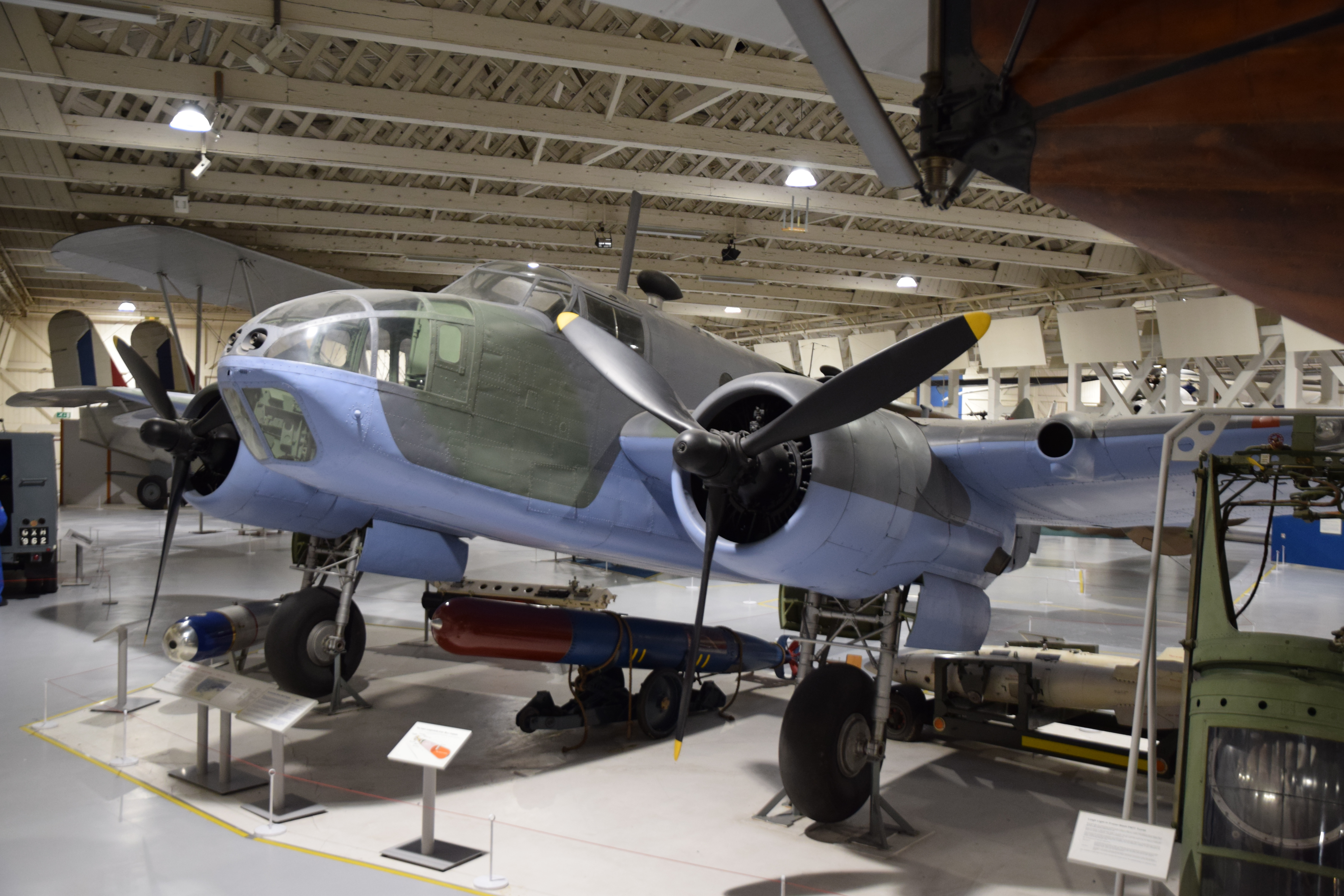
RAF Beaufort with torpedo

=== Torpedo bombers ===
Bristol Beaufort

The Beaufort was derived from a medium bomber and was used by the Fleet Air Arm from 1940 until the end of the war. The Beauforts operated could use both torpedoes and bombs and lay naval mines.

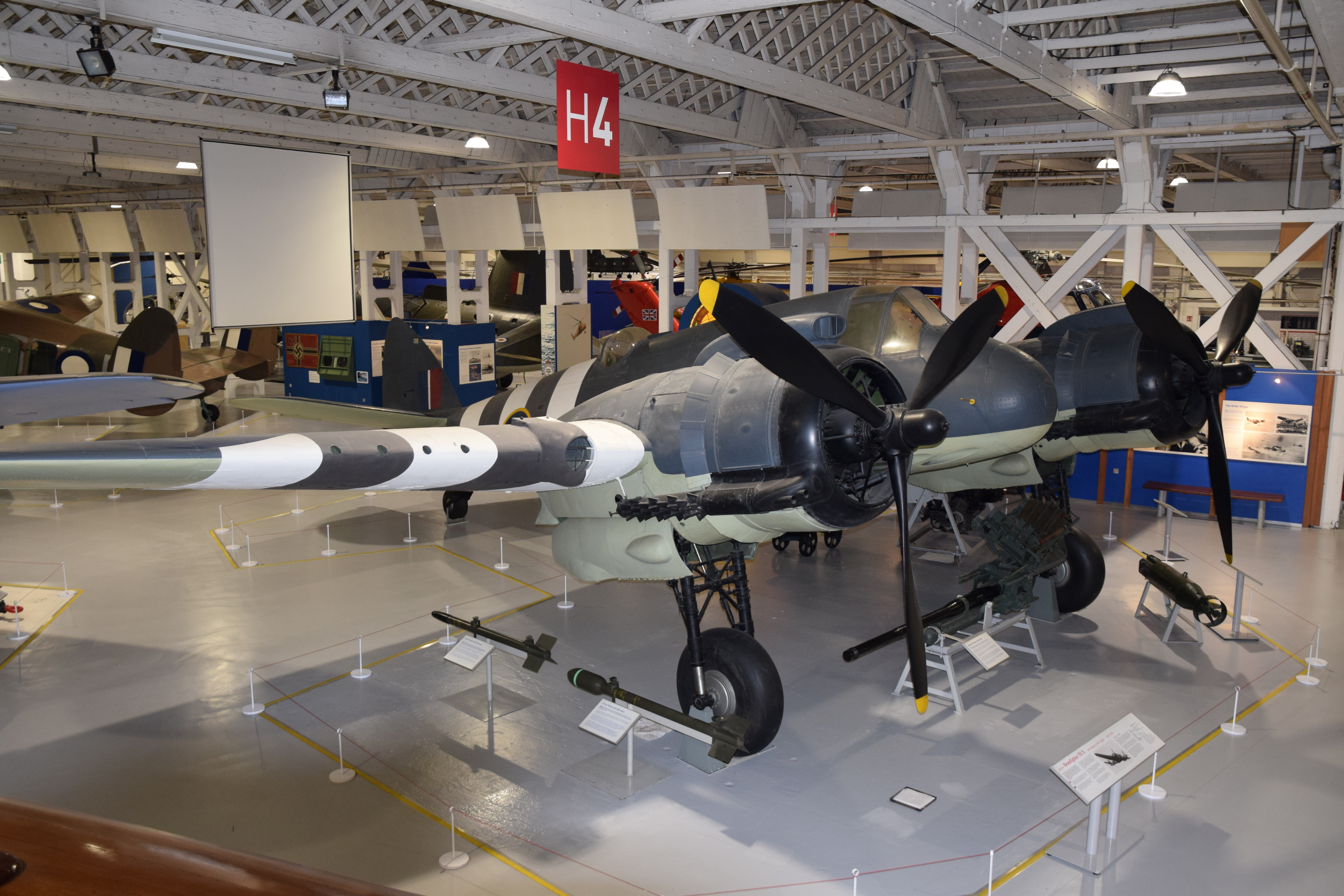
Beaufighter TF.X at RAF Museum with examples of its armament

Bristol Beaufighter

The Bristol Beaufighter was an interim heavy fighter based on the Bristol Beaufort. It was used for attacks on Axis shipping by FAA and RAF Coastal Command. The main variant used by the FAA was the Beaufighter Mk X as used by 772 Naval Air Squadron and 728 Naval Air Squadron. In addition to the four 20mm Hispano Mk.II autocannons they carried, they were armed with either eight RP-3 rockets or a single torpedo. They were equipped with ASV radar.

=== Other ===
Armstrong Whitworth Whitley
Small number used for training in Merlin engine management

Miles Martinet
Target tug

== See also ==
- List of aircraft of the Fleet Air Arm
