= Operation Millet =

1944 British naval operation in the Indian Ocean

Operation Millet was a British naval operation in World War II, the objective being the execution naval bombardment and aerial strikes on Japanese positions in the Nicobar Islands, on 17–20 October 1944, in order to distract Japanese forces from an American invasion of the Philippine province of Leyte. Ships involved included Aircraft carriers HMS Victorious and HMS Indomitable; battlecruiser HMS Renown; and light cruiser HMS Phoebe.

Only negligible opposition was encountered until the morning of 19 October when, in an air battle, seven out of a force of twelve Japanese torpedo bombers were shot down for the loss of three of the British carrier aircraft.

As a diversion the attacks had no effect, for the Japanese had already concentrated all their naval forces for the defence of the Philippine islands group.
