= HMS Indomitable (92) =

1941 Illustrious-class aircraft carrier of the Royal Navy

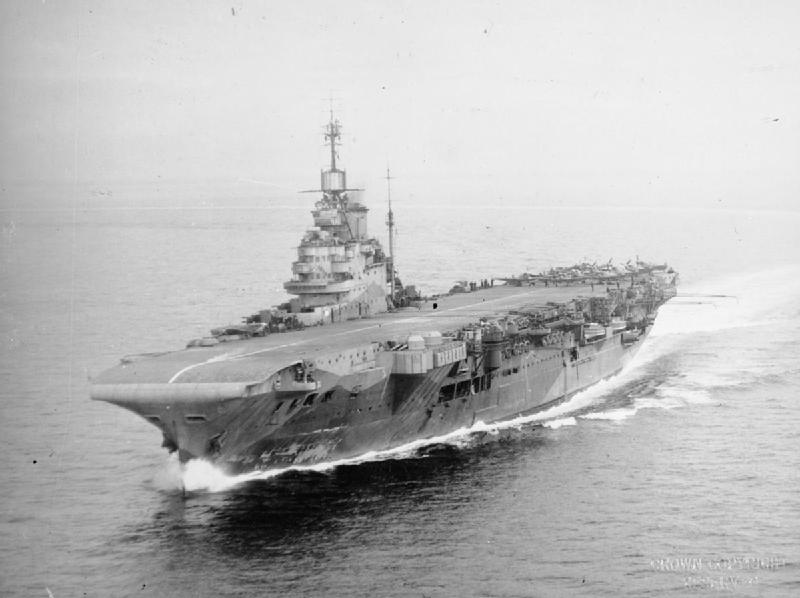
- Indomitable in 1943

History

United Kingdom
- Name: Indomitable
- Ordered: 6 July 1937
- Builder: Vickers-Armstrongs, Barrow-in-Furness
- Laid down: 10 November 1937
- Launched: 26 March 1940
- Commissioned: 10 October 1941
- Identification: Pennant number: 92
- Fate: Sold for scrap, 1955

General characteristics
- Class & type: Modified Illustrious-class aircraft carrier
- Displacement: 23,000 long tons (23,000 t) (standard)
- Length: 230.0 m (754 ft 7 in)
- Beam: 29.2 m (95 ft 10 in)
- Draught: 8.8 m (28 ft 10 in)
- Installed power: 6 × Admiralty 3-drum boilers; 111,000 shaft horsepower (83,000 kW)
- Propulsion: 3 shafts; geared steam turbines
- Speed: 30.5 knots (56.5 km/h; 35.1 mph)
- Range: 11,000 nmi (20,000 km; 13,000 mi) at 14 knots (26 km/h; 16 mph)
- Complement: 1,392; 2,100 (later)
- Armament: 8 × twin 4.5 in (114 mm) AA guns; 6 × octuple 2 pdr (40 mm (1.6 in)) AA guns; 10 × single 20 mm (0.8 in) AA guns
- Aircraft carried: 48–55

HMS Indomitable was a modified Illustrious-class aircraft carrier built for the Royal Navy during World War II. Originally planned to be the fourth of the class, she was redesigned to enable her to operate more aircraft, 48 instead of 36. A second hangar was added above the original, raising the flight deck by 14 feet (4.3 m), although the hangar-side armour had to be reduced to compensate. The lower hangar was made shorter than the upper hangar due to the need for extra workshops and accommodation to support the added aircraft.

== Construction and early history ==
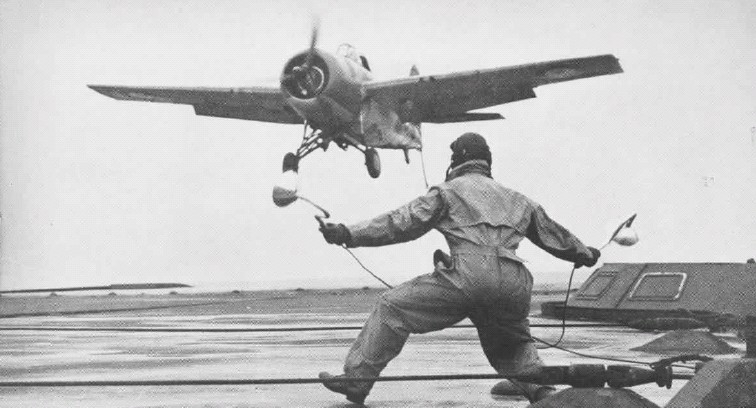
An LSO aboard Indomitable in 1942

Indomitable was laid down by Vickers-Armstrongs at Barrow-in-Furness, on 10 November 1937. She was launched on 26 March 1940 and commissioned the following year in October. She was christened by Clementine Churchill.

She sailed to the West Indies in November 1941 for her maiden voyage. While there, Indomitable ran aground on a coral reef near Jamaica, though she returned to service soon afterwards. This did mean she did not reach Southeast Asia in time to provide air cover for Force Z, a naval force sent to deter the Japanese from attacking Singapore. This force was sunk by Japanese aircraft when the Japanese landed in Malaya in December 1941. The following month, in January 1942, Indomitable joined the Eastern Fleet based at Ceylon (now Sri Lanka). At the end of January, she ferried 48 Royal Air Force Hawker Hurricanes to airfields in Sumatra in the Dutch East Indies, to reinforce the air defenses of Singapore, but a large proportion of the Hawker Hurricanes were destroyed on the ground by Japanese air raids. The British commanders in Singapore surrendered to the Japanese on 15 February.

After the fall of Britain's remaining Far Eastern colonies Hong Kong and Burma, Indomitable was redeployed. A new Eastern Fleet was established under the command of Admiral Sir James Somerville. Indomitable, and her sister ship Formidable were the only modern aircraft carriers of the Fleet, and were a vital asset to the Allies in the Far East; the only other carrier, Hermes, was obsolete.

In April 1942 Somerville attempted to intercept the Japanese carrier strike force during their Indian Ocean raid. Incomplete intelligence led him to abandon his ambush just hours before the Japanese force arrived. Over the next few days Indomitable was part of a force that attempted to intercept the Japanese fleet at night, where the slow but radar-equipped Fairey Albacore torpedo bombers would have the best chance of a successful strike. Despite several days of searching, no decisive action was achieved and Somerville eventually withdrew his fast carriers to Bombay. Hermes, the two heavy cruisers, Cornwall and Dorsetshire, the corvette HMS Hollyhock, and the Australian destroyer HMAS Vampire, were sunk in action during this Japanese raid, as were a score of merchant ships.

In May 1942 the British launched Operation Ironclad, the invasion of French Madagascar. It was feared that the Japanese would themselves occupy Madagascar and use it as a submarine base to attack Allied convoy routes in the Indian Ocean.

Indomitable was detached from the Eastern Fleet to take part in the invasion, rendezvousing with the covering force (which included her sister ship Illustrious) and the invasion force which had been sent from Durban, South Africa. The assault began on 5 May at Courrier Bay, just west of the actual objective of Diego Suarez. Indomitable's air wing attacked Arrachart airfield on the opening day of the invasion, destroying five Morane-Saulnier M.S.406 fighters and damaging two more as well as two Potez 63.11s. The following day a ground assault began, with Indomitable's Albacores bombing the defences and her Fulmars and Sea Hurricanes flying ground attack sorties. French forces in Diego Suarez surrendered on 7 May. On 8 May, the French submarine Monge attempted to torpedo Indomitable but was sunk by depth charges from the destroyers HMS Active and Panther.

== The Mediterranean ==
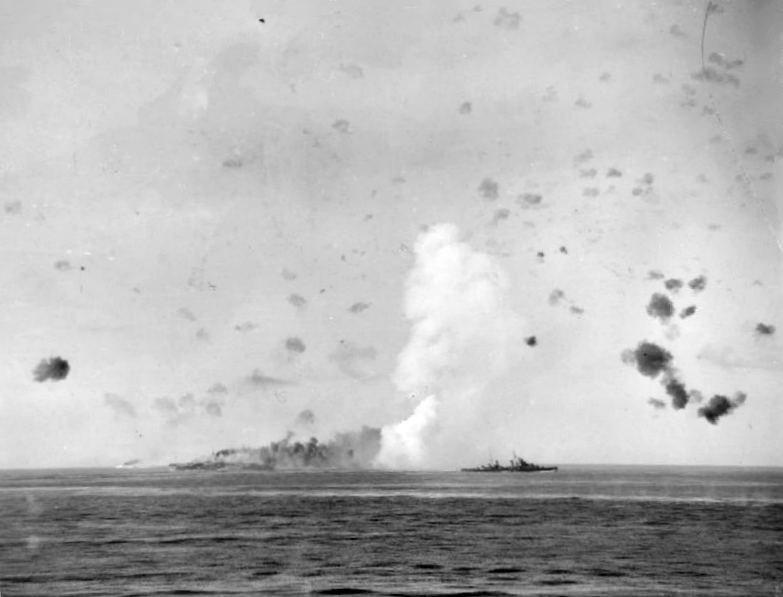
12 August 1942: Indomitable on fire after being bombed. HMS Charybdis is screening the carrier.

In July, Indomitable returned to the United Kingdom. She was soon back in action, participating in Operation Pedestal, the largest convoy to supply the besieged island of Malta. This convoy comprised 14 cargo ships and an unprecedentedly large escort of warships: Cairo, Charybdis, Eagle, Indomitable, Victorious, Kenya, Manchester, Nelson, Nigeria, Phoebe, Rodney, Sirius and 32 destroyers. One objective was for Furious to launch her Spitfires to land at Malta, where they would remain; this was done on 11 August, and Furious returned to Gibraltar.

During the operation Indomitable was hit by two 500 kg bombs (by Ju 87s belonging to StG 3) and suffered three near misses. One 500 kg bomb penetrated the unarmoured portion of the flight deck, causing damage that required her to withdraw for repairs, although she was able to steam at 28.5 knots (52.8 km/h; 32.8 mph) fewer than two hours after the hits. Casualties were 6 officers and 40 ratings killed, and 70 ratings wounded. (The attack may be viewed at the seventeen-minute mark of the documentary Malta Convoy listed in the external links section). She sailed to Liverpool's Gladstone Dock, where repairs were completed in February 1943, after which she worked up off Scapa Flow and in the Clyde area before returning to the Mediterranean in the build-up to Operation Husky.

She was torpedoed by a Savoia-Marchetti SM.79 of 204^{a} Squadriglia of the 41° Torpedo Bomber Group on 16 July while supporting the buildup for the Allied invasion of Sicily (Operation Husky) and returned again to the United States, where repairs were completed. She commenced sea trials 10 April 1944.

== The Far East ==
Indomitable returned to the Eastern Fleet in early 1944. She and Victorious launched bombers against Sumatra in August and September. They later bombed the Nicobar Islands, after which Indomitable joined up with Illustrious to attack Medan and Sumatra again on 20 December. The following year, Indomitable joined the British Pacific Fleet. On 4 January 1945 she, her sister ship Victorious and another fleet carrier Indefatigable attacked Medan. Subsequent actions were taken against Palembang and Sumatra, later in January. On 4 May 1945 she was hit by a kamikaze, but her armoured flight deck saved her from serious damage. In August, with the war ending, Indomitable supported the liberation of Hong Kong, arriving after a landing party from HMCS Prince Robert had taken the Japanese surrender. Her aircraft flew the carrier's last combat missions of the war and of her career on 31 August and 1 September against Japanese suicide boats which were attacking British forces.

== Post-war ==
Indomitable returned to the UK in November 1945. The following year she carried the Great Britain national rugby league team to Australia on their first post-war tour, earning the team the nickname, 'The Indomitables'. In 1947, she was placed in reserve, and then given a refit that took three years, from 1947 to 1950. Late in her refit her boilers were discovered to have only 10 years of life, and the engine spaces had to be torn apart and rebuilt to replace the boilers. Upon the completion of her refit she returned to operational duty with the Home Fleet in far cooler climates than her wartime operations. She was unique in carrying the day-and-night de Havilland Hornet fighter, and the navalised Sea Hornet NF.12 radar-equipped night fighter also carried by HMS Eagle in 1951–53, which was faster and longer-ranged compared to the carrier's Blackburn Firebrand torpedo strike aircraft.

In 1951, Indomitable replaced the Royal Navy's last battleship, HMS Vanguard, as the Home Fleet flagship. On 3 February 1953, she was badly damaged by an internal fire and explosion, the damage was later covered in concrete and never repaired. In the same year, she sailed to take part in the Fleet Review to celebrate the Coronation of Elizabeth II. She then did deck landings in the Channel the same month, with the prototype mirror landing light setup to make the landing of faster jet aircraft more efficient and safer replacing the batsman. Indomitable was not modernized for several reasons, chief of which was that to make her capable of handling jet aircraft, her hangar height would have to be increased from 14 feet (4.3 m) to 17.5 feet (5.3 m). This would require tearing the ship down to the hangar deck itself. Given the escalating costs of the modernization of her half-sister Victorious, the Admiralty decided against a complete modernization for a ship of her age.

== Decommissioning and disposal ==
Indomitable returned to the reserve fleet, and in October 1953 she was placed in unmaintained reserve. She was sold for scrap and arrived at Faslane for breaking up on 30 September 1955.

== Bibliography ==
- Beaver, P (1987). The British Aircraft Carrier. London: Patrick Stephens. ISBN 978-0-85059-877-3.
- Brown, David (1977). WWII Fact Files: Aircraft Carriers. New York: Arco Publishing. ISBN 0-668-04164-1.
- Brown, J. D. (2009). Carrier Operations in World War II. Annapolis, Maryland: Naval Institute Press. ISBN 978-1-59114-108-2.
- Brown, Robert (2026). "Royal Navy Fleet Carriers: Second World War Battle Damage". In Jordan, John (ed.). Warship 2026. Osprey Publishing. pp. 30–47. ISBN 978-1-4728-7259-3.
- Campbell, John (1985). Naval Weapons of World War II. Annapolis, Maryland: Naval Institute Press. ISBN 0-87021-459-4.
- Campbell, N. J. M. (1980). "Great Britain". In Chesneau, Roger (ed.). Conway's All the World's Fighting Ships 1922–1946. New York: Mayflower Books. pp. 2–85. ISBN 0-8317-0303-2.
- Chesneau, Roger (1995). Aircraft Carriers of the World, 1914 to the Present: An Illustrated Encyclopedia (New, Revised ed.). Annapolis, Maryland: Naval Institute Press. ISBN 0-87021-902-2.
- Colledge, J. J.; Warlow, Ben (2006) [1969]. Ships of the Royal Navy: The Complete Record of All Fighting Ships of the Royal Navy from the 15th Century to the Present (3rd Rev ed.). London: Chatham Publishing. ISBN 978-1-86176-281-8. OCLC 67375475.
- Crabb, Brian James (2014). Operation Pedestal: The story of Convoy WS21S in August 1942. Donington: Shaun Tyas. ISBN 978-1-907730-19-1.
- Eneberg, E. & Frampton, Viktor (1987). "Question 19/84". Warship International. XXIV (1): 93. ISSN 0043-0374.
- Friedman, Norman (1988). British Carrier Aviation: The Evolution of the Ships and Their Aircraft. Annapolis, Maryland: Naval Institute Press. ISBN 0-87021-054-8.
- Garzke, William H. & Dulin, Robert O. (1985). Battleships: Axis and Neutral Battleships in World War II. Annapolis, Maryland: Naval Institute Press. ISBN 978-0-87021-101-0.
- Hobbs, David (2013). British Aircraft Carriers: Design, Development and Service Histories. Barnsley, UK: Seaforth Publishing. ISBN 978-1-84832-138-0.
- Hobbs, David (2011). The British Pacific Fleet: The Royal Navy's Most Powerful Strike Force. Annapolis, Maryland: Naval Institute Press. ISBN 978-1-59114-044-3.
- McCart, Neil (2000). The Illustrious & Implacable Classes of Aircraft Carrier 1940–1969. Cheltenham, UK: Fan Publications. ISBN 1-901225-04-6.
- Polmar, Norman (2011). Aircraft Carriers: a History of Carrier Aviation and Its Influence on World Events, Volume II: 1946-2006. Dulles: Potomac Books. ISBN 978-1-59797-343-4.
- Preston, Antony (1995). "United Kingdom". In Chumbley, Stephen (ed.). Conway's All the World's Fighting Ships 1947-1995. Annapolis, Maryland: Naval Institute Press. pp. 479–543. ISBN 1-55750-132-7.
- Rohwer, Jürgen & Hümmelchen, Gerhard (1992). Chronology of the War at Sea 1939–1945. London: Greenhill Books. ISBN 1-85367-117-7.
- Shores, Christopher (1996). Dust Clouds in the Middle East: The Air War for East Africa, Iraq, Syria, Iran and Madagascar, 1940–42. London: Grub Street. ISBN 1-898697-37-X.
- Shores, Christopher; Massimello, Giovanni; Guest, Russell; Olynyk, Frank; Bock, Winfried & Thomas, Andy (2018). A History of the Mediterranean Air War 1940–1945: Volume Four: Sicily and Italy to the Fall of Rome: 14 May, 1943 – 5 June 1944. London: Grub Street. ISBN 978-1-911621-10-2.
- Sturtivant, Ray (1984). The Squadrons of the Fleet Air Arm. Tonbridge, UK: Air-Britain (Historians). ISBN 0-85130-120-7.
