= Charge =

Charge or charged may refer to:

== Arts, entertainment, and media ==
=== Films ===
- Charge, Zero Emissions/Maximum Speed, a 2011 documentary

=== Music ===
- Charge (David Ford album)
- Charge (Machel Montano album)
- Charge!!, an album by The Aquabats
- Charged (Nebula album)
- Charged (Toshinori Kondo, Eraldo Bernocchi and Bill Laswell album)

=== Television ===
- Charge (TV series)
- Charge! (TV network)
- "Charged" (Reaper), episode 2 of season one of Reaper

== Companies ==
- Charge (South Africa), an EV charging infrastructure operator
- Charge Automotive Limited, an electric-vehicle manufacturer
- Charged Records, a record label

== Finance ==
- Equitable charge, confers a right on the secured party to look to a particular asset in the event of the debtor's default
- Floating charge, a security interest over the assets of a company

== Law ==
- Criminal charge, a formal accusation made before a court by a prosecuting authority
- Legal charge, information or indictment through a formal legal process

== Mathematics, science, and technology ==
- Charge (physics), the susceptibility (state of being affected) of a body to one of the fundamental forces
  - Color charge, a property of quarks and gluons, related to their strong interactions
  - Electric charge, a property which determines the electromagnetic interaction of subatomic particles
  - Magnetic charge, a property of theoretical magnetic monopoles
- Charge, the air and fuel mixture fed into an internal combustion engine
- CHARGE syndrome, a specific set of birth defects in children
- Explosive charge, a measured quantity of explosive material
- Signed, finitely additive measure in mathematics

== Military and iconography ==
- Charge (bugle call)
- Charge (warfare), a military manoeuvre
- Charges (military), ranks used in German-speaking armies
- Charge (heraldry), any object depicted on a shield

== Sports ==
- Charge (basketball), illegal contact by pushing or moving into another player's torso
- Charge (ice hockey), illegal contact by taking three or more strides or jumping before hitting an opponent
- Charge (fanfare), played at sporting events
- Guangzhou Charge, a Chinese esports team in the Overwatch League
- Ottawa Charge, a women's hockey team

== Other uses ==
- Charge of the Goddess, a text often used in the religion Wicca
- Charge (student associations), the executive of German student fraternities
- Charge (youth), an underage person placed in the care of a medieval nobleman
- Charge, a type of pen spinning trick
- Chargé d'affaires, two classes of diplomatic agents
- Pastoral charge, a group of congregants in some Protestant churches

== See also ==
- Charger (disambiguation)
- Supercharge (disambiguation)
