= 2nd Carrier Air Group =

Royal Navy Fleet Air Arm Carrier Air Group

- White Ensign
- Active: 30 June 1945 – 31 October 1945
- Country: United Kingdom
- Branch: Royal Navy
- Type: Carrier Air Group
- Size: 2 x fighter squadron; 1 x TBR squadron
- Part of: Fleet Air Arm
- Formed for: Illustrious-class aircraft carrier
- Engagements: World War II: Pacific War; Air raids on Japan

2nd Carrier Air Group (2nd CAG) was a Fleet Air Arm (FAA) carrier air group of the Royal Navy (RN). It was initially formed in June 1945, for service in the British Pacific Fleet, until disbanding during the same year, in October. The unit was formed for the Illustrious-class aircraft carrier HMS Formidable.

== Naval Air Squadrons ==
2nd Carrier Air Group consisted of a number of squadrons of the Fleet Air Arm.

Squadron	Aircraft	From	To
848 Naval Air Squadron	Grumman Avenger Mk.I, II	June 1945	October 1945
1841 Naval Air Squadron	Vought Corsair Mk IV	June 1945	October 1945
1842 Naval Air Squadron	Vought Corsair Mk IV	June 1945	October 1945

== History ==
Following the conclusion of World War II in Europe, the squadrons of the Fleet Air Arm, stationed on the Royal Navy's Fleet and Light Fleet aircraft carriers, were reorganised into Air Groups in accordance with United States Navy policy. This restructuring was designed to enhance operational effectiveness in the Pacific Theater against Japanese forces in 1945. Carrier Air Groups one through six were allocated to the three Illustrious-class aircraft carriers. Each air group included two squadrons of Vought Corsairs and one squadron of Grumman Avengers, with each squadron consisting of fifteen aircraft.

=== 1945 ===
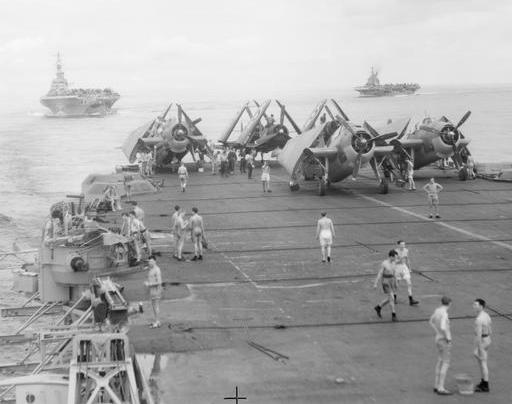
Avenger and Corsair aircraft on HMS Formidable, off Japan, on 10 July 1945

The 2nd Carrier Air Group was formed on 30 June 1945. It was for the Illustrious-class carrier HMS Formidable, for service as part of the British Pacific Fleet. The 2nd CAG was formed of 848 Naval Air Squadron, which was equipped with Grumman Avenger, an American torpedo bomber aircraft, along with 1841 and 1842 Naval Air Squadrons, both previously part of the 6th Naval Fighter Wing, and operated the Vought Corsair an American carrier-borne fighter aircraft.

==== Mainland Japan strikes ====
Series one of the airstrikes on Mainland Japan took place between 17 and 19 July.

Aircraft from the 2nd Carrier Air Group engaged in multiple sorties during this period. HMS Formidable deployed sixteen Vought Corsairs for airstrike 1, targeting airfields at Matsushima and Sendai in northern Honshu, as well as Hasuda, located just north of Tokyo, with each aircraft equipped with two 500 lb bombs. Five aircraft were destroyed on the ground, while three sustained damage; hangars and airfield structures were also impacted. Airstrike 5, another Ramrod operation, saw HMS Formidable launch ten Vought Corsairs to assault Niigata airfield, with each aircraft carrying one 500 lb bomb. Two aircraft were destroyed, and two were damaged, with hangars and airfield buildings being struck. By the conclusion of the day's operations, the Air Group had incurred the loss of four aircraft, three of which were combat losses, and one that ditched.

On the 18 July, inclement weather hindered the commencement of operations. HMS Formidable once more deployed sixteen Vought Corsairs, each equipped with two 500 lb bombs, for Airstrike 1, a Ramrod mission targeting airfields at Mobara, Naruto, and Hasuda, located in the Tokyo region. During Airstrike 5, the carrier launched a Ramrod consisting of eight Vought Corsairs to assault the Katori, Konoike, and Kitaura airfields, resulting in the destruction of six aircraft on the ground and damage to three others. The Air Group suffered the loss of two Vought Corsairs due to enemy engagement, with both pilots reported missing.

A replenishment and refuelling period, initially scheduled from 20 to 23 July, was moved forward to 19 July because of adverse weather conditions. The weather continued to be unfavourable for the resumption of flying operations until 24 July.

The second wave of airstrikes targeting Mainland Japan took place between 24 and 25 July.

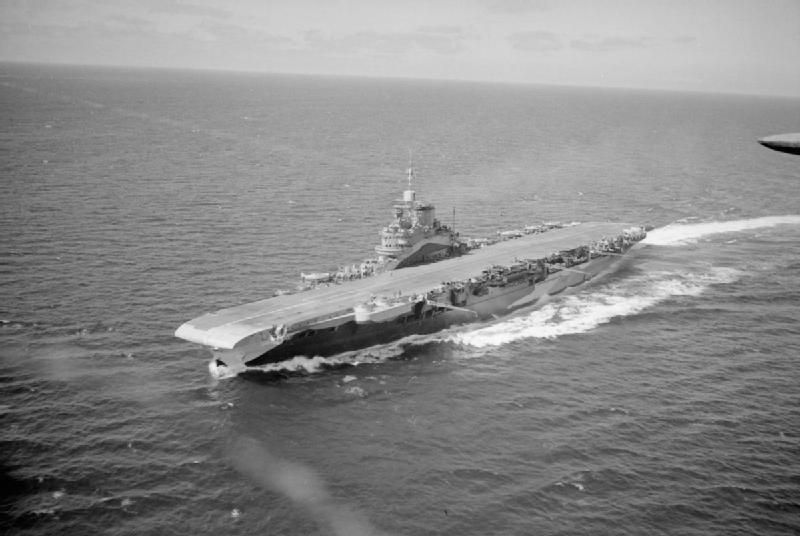
HMS Formidable

On 24 July, airstrike 1A consisted of eleven Vought Corsairs from HMS Formidable, targeting airfields located at Kurashiki, Okayama, and Takamatsu; Airstrike 2 was initiated to strike the airfield at Tokushima and included a combined force featuring Grumman Avengers from the carrier. Airstrike 3A involved an eight Vought Corsair Ramrod launched by the Air Group. Additionally, 5A comprised twelve Vought Corsairs from the carrier, designated for an anti-shipping sweep in the Inland Sea.

The Air Group experienced losses, including one Vought Corsair and one Grumman Avenger due to combat, as well as one Vought Corsair and one Grumman Avenger that were ditched. Furthermore, three Vought Corsairs sustained damage from deck crashes. On the 25 July, airstrike 1A consisted of eight Vought Corsairs from HMS Formidable, each equipped with two 500 lb bombs intended for a shipping assault in the Inland Sea. Airstrike 3 was a joint operation involving twenty Grumman Avengers, commanded by 848 Squadron from HMS Formidable. An additional replenishment period occurred from 26 to 27 July.

Series two airstrikes continued between 28 and 30 July.

During 28 July, airstrike 1A consisted of twelve Vought Corsairs from HMS Formidable, tasked with an emphasis on anit-shipping operations in the Inland Sea. Airstrike 3A involved eight Vought Corsairs deployed by the Air Group for strikes against shipping and the Fukuyama airfield, while airstrike 5A focused on anti-shipping operations and targets at Fuge, comprising twelve Vought Corsairs from the carrier.

On 29 July, there were no scheduled air operations. On 30 July, airstrike 1A consisted of ten Vought Corsairs from HMS Formidable, tasked with focusing on shipping within the Inland Sea, while airstrike 3A involved eight Vought Corsairs launched from the carrier to conduct shipping strikes at Maizuru.

A combination of bad weather, refuelling requirements and the Atomic bombings of Hiroshima and Nagasaki resulted in a stop to any sorties until the resumption of air operations on 9 August. The following replenishment period was planned from 31 July to 2 August. Nevertheless, the third series of strikes on mainland Japan was delayed because of unfavourable weather conditions; the subsequent round of strikes was initially scheduled for 5 August but needed to be postponed to 8 August. An additional replenishment period occurred on 6 and 7 August, and the third series of strikes on mainland Japan was arranged for 8 to 11 August.

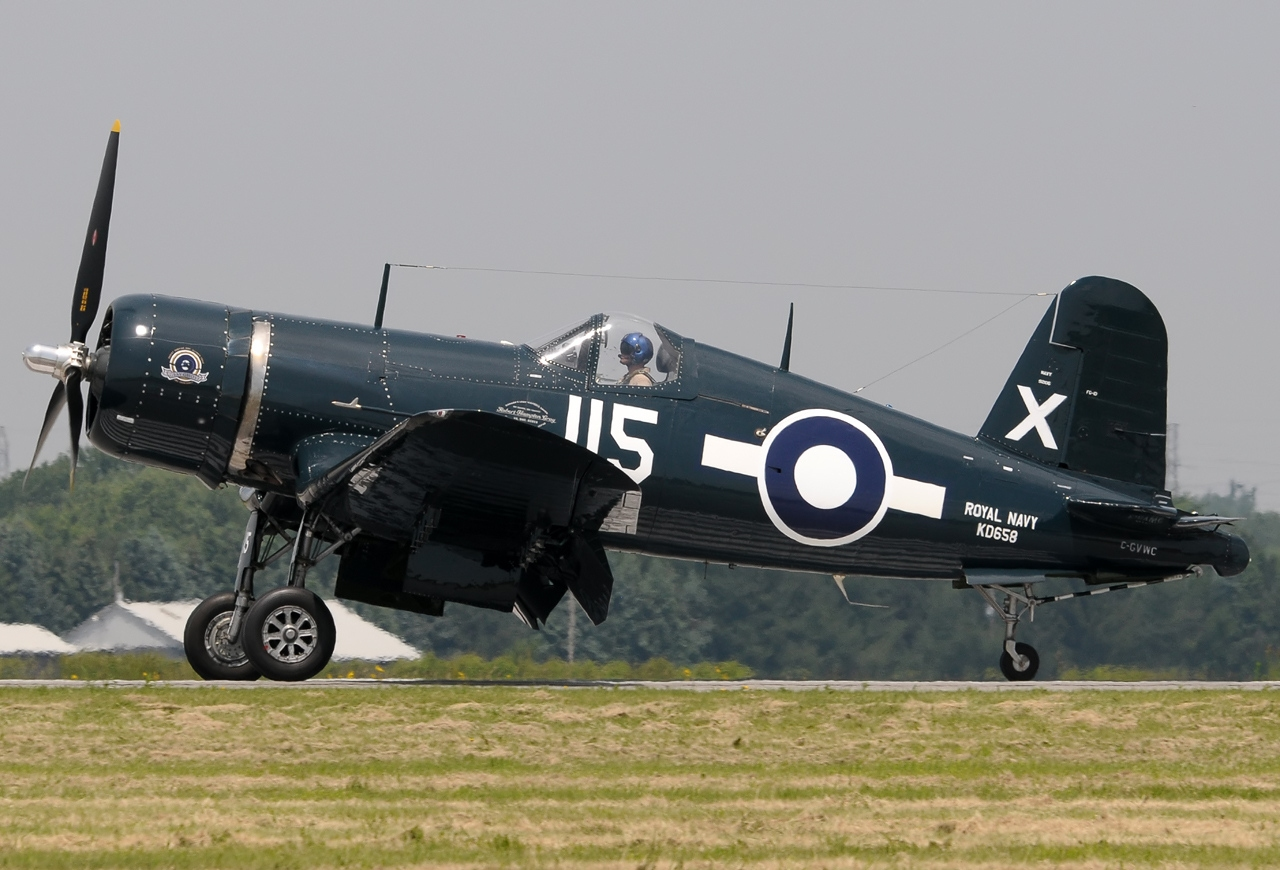
Goodyear FG-1D Corsair, in the markings of the aircraft flown by Lieutenant Robert Hampton Gray

The 2nd CAG’s Grumman Avenger aircraft flew off HMS Formidable and attacked Matsushima Air Field during the morning of 9 August. This was followed by eight of the group’s Corsair aircraft, led by Lieutenant Robert Hampton Gray, RCNVR, a Canadian naval officer and senior pilot of 1841 Naval Air Squadron. However, Lieutenant Gray was diverted to attack Japanese warships located in Onagawa Wan, Miyagi Prefecture. Two escort ships were spotted and Gray led his aircraft into attack. Intense flak set his engine on fire, but he continued his attack, skip bombing a 500-pound (230 kg) bomb into the Etorofu-class escort Amakusa, sinking the ship with the loss of 157 lives. Unfortunately, after releasing the bomb, Gray's aircraft rolled inverted and crashed into the sea; he did not survive. Gray was later posthumously awarded the Victoria Cross (VC).

The 10 August was designated as the concluding day of strikes prior to the withdrawal of Task Force 37 (TF 37), the British Pacific Fleet, to Australia for an additional maintenance and replenishment phase. Airstrike 1A consisted of ten Vought Corsairs deployed from HMS Formidable to engage targets at Matsushima and Masuda airfields. Airstrike 3A involved eight Vought Corsairs launched from the same carrier, also targeting Matsushima. These operations were succeeded by a replenishment period on the 11 August.

On 12 August, Task Force 37 was disbanded, and the majority of the British Pacific Fleet set its course for Manus Island, subsequently proceeding to Sydney, Australia. The remaining forces were integrated into United States Navy's Task Force 38 and became Task Group 38.5. HMS Formidable was en route when the announcement of the Japanese surrender was made on 15 August.

They reached Manus on 18 August, where 1841 Squadron briefly disembarked at RNAS Ponam (HMS Nabaron), re-embarking the following day as the carrier sailed for Australia. 1841 and 1842 Squadrons disembarked to RNAS Nowra (HMS Nabbington) upon arrival at the New South Wales coast on 23 August, with 848 Squadron the following day.

The group then left its aircraft in Australia and personnel returned to the United Kingdom, on sister ship HMS Victorious, where the Air Group disbanded on 31 October 1945.

=== Aircraft carriers ===
Aircraft carriers which the 1st Carrier Air Group was assigned to:

- HMS Formidable (June - October 1945)

=== Aircraft used ===
Aircraft used by the naval air squadrons that formed the 2nd Carrier Air Group in 1945:

- Grumman Avenger, an American torpedo bomber
- Vought Corsair, an American fighter aircraft

== Air Group Commanders ==
List of commanding officers of the 2nd Carrier Air Group, with date of appointment:

- Lieutenant Colonel P.P. Nelson-Gracie, RM, 4 July 1945
- disbanded - 31 October 1945

== See also ==
- List of Fleet Air Arm groups
- List of aircraft carriers of the Royal Navy
- List of aircraft of the Fleet Air Arm
- List of Fleet Air Arm aircraft in World War II
