= Charger =

Charger or Chargers may refer to:

== Music ==
- "Charger" (song), a song by Gorillaz from the album Humanz
- The Chargers (band), an American garage rock band

== People ==
- Jasilyn Charger (born 1996), American activist

== Sports ==
- Los Angeles Chargers, a professional American football team
  - San Diego Chargers, a former professional American football team that relocated to Los Angeles in 2017
- Gold Coast Chargers, an Australian rugby league team
- Deccan Chargers, an Indian cricket team
- Alabama–Huntsville Chargers, the athletic teams of the University of Alabama in Huntsville
- London Chargers, a rugby league club
- Jackson Chargers, a soccer club
- Ansonia Chargers, football team at Ansonia High School (Connecticut)

== Military and weaponry ==
- USS Charger, United States Navy escort carrier
- HMS Charger, six different Royal Navy ships
- Charger (firearm), a common and chiefly British term for a stripper clip, used in the reloading of firearms
- A war horse
- The squadron name for US Navy Strike Fighter Squadron VFA-161

== Technology ==
=== Electronics ===
- Battery charger, a device used to put energy into a cell or battery
- Capacitor charger, typically a high voltage DC power supply designed to rapidly charge a bank of capacitors in pulsed power applications

=== Vehicles ===
- NATO code name for the Tupolev Tu-144 supersonic transport
- Dodge Charger, three entirely different Dodge vehicles bearing the Charger nameplate
- Siemens Charger, a model of diesel-electric rail locomotive
- Chrysler Valiant Charger, produced by Chrysler Australia from 1971
- Convair Charger prototype light attack and observation aircraft

=== Other uses ===
- Whipped-cream charger, a cartridge designed to deliver nitrous oxide in a whipped cream dispenser

== Other uses ==
- Charger (table setting), decorative plates used to enhance a place setting
- A type of special infected in Left 4 Dead 2

== See also ==
- Charge (disambiguation)
- Chargeurs
- Supercharger (disambiguation)
- Tesla Megacharger
- Turbocharger
