= Charging =

Charging may refer to:

- Charging (ice hockey), when a player takes more than three steps before checking an opposing player
- Battery charger, a device used to put energy into a rechargeable battery
- Charging station, a device used for recharging the battery in an electric car
- On a timesheet, claiming time worked under a specific task or project code
- Sending an invoice

== See also ==
- Charge (disambiguation)
- Charger (disambiguation)
