= 1841 Naval Air Squadron =

Inactive Royal Navy Fleet Air Arm and Reserve Air Squadron

- Squadron badge
- Active: 1944–1945; 1952–1957
- Disbanded: 10 March 1957
- Country: United Kingdom
- Branch: Royal Navy
- Type: Single-seat fighter squadron; Royal Naval Volunteer Reserve Air Squadron
- Role: Carrier-based fighter squadron; Anti-submarine squadron
- Size: Eighteen aircraft (1944-45)
- Part of: Fleet Air Arm
- Home station: See Naval air stations section for full list.
- Mottos: Aquila moras nescit (Latin for 'The eagle knows no obstacles')
- Engagements: World War II: European theatre of World War II; Operation Mascot; Operation Goodwood; Pacific War; Operation Iceberg; Air raids on Japan
- Battle honours: Norway 1944; Okinawa 1945; Japan 1945

Insignia
- Squadron Badge Description: Blue, over a base barry wavy of four white and blue an eagle volant gold armed red holding in its talons a dolphin green (1953)
- Identification Markings: 7A+ (Corsair); 111-128 (Corsair March 1945); 309-311 (Avenger); 869-874 (Avenger January 1956)
- Fin Carrier/Shore Code: X (Corsair March 1945); ST (Avenger)

Aircraft flown
- Attack: Grumman Avenger
- Fighter: Vought Corsair
- Reconnaissance: Fairey Firefly
- Trainer: North American Harvard; Avro Anson
- Transport: Percival Sea Prince

1841 Naval Air Squadron (1841 NAS) was a Fleet Air Arm (FAA) naval air squadron of the United Kingdom’s Royal Navy (RN) between 1944 and 1945 and then a Royal Naval Volunteer Reserve Air Squadron from 1952 to 1957. Established as a fighter squadron at RN Air Section Brunswick in January 1944. The squadron arrived in the UK in June, with a small group stationed at RN Air Section Speke while the rest were at RNAS Ayr. They regrouped on the aircraft carrier HMS Formidable, with HMS Sparrowhawk RNAS Hatston, serving as the main shore base. In July and August, the squadron provided fighter support for attacks on the German battleship Tirpitz. In September, it joined the 6th Naval Fighter Wing and traveled with the carrier to the Far East, landing at HMS Rajaliya, RNAS Puttalam, Ceylon, in February 1945. The squadron, engaged in combat over the Sakishima Gunto in April and May, before joining the 2nd Carrier Air Group in June. Near the war's end, they fought around Tokyo, where Lieutenant Robert Hampton Gray, DSC, RCNVR, was killed while attacking a Japanese destroyer under heavy fire. He was posthumously awarded the Victoria Cross for his bravery. After V-J Day, the squadron lost its aircraft and its members returned to the United Kingdom on the aircraft carrier HMS Victorious, disbanding upon arrival in October 1945.

== History ==
=== Single-seat fighter squadron (1944-1945) ===
1841 Naval Air Squadron was officially established in the United States at the US Naval Air Station Brunswick, Maine, on 1 March 1944. It was organised as a single-seat fighter squadron and was commanded by Lieutenant Commander(A) R.L. Bigg-Wither, DSC and Bar, RN. The aircraft it initially operated comprised a combination of eighteen Vought Corsair carrier-based fighter aircraft, containing the Vought Chance built F4U-1 and F4U-1A, known as the Mk I and II respectively in the Fleet Air Arm and the Brewster built F3A-1 and F3A-1D, known as the Mk III in Fleet Air Arm service, but later the squadron standardised on the Mk II.

Following familiarisation, the flying training comprised navigation drills, low-level flying, formation flying, and air combat manoeuvring, along with Aerodrome Dummy Deck Landing (ADDL) training. Two additional disciplines that needed to be practiced and perfected were night-time flying and landing on a carrier deck and the squadron travelled to the escort carriers USS Charger and USS Kasaan Bay, in Chesapeake Bay, for the purpose of conducting Deck Landing Training.

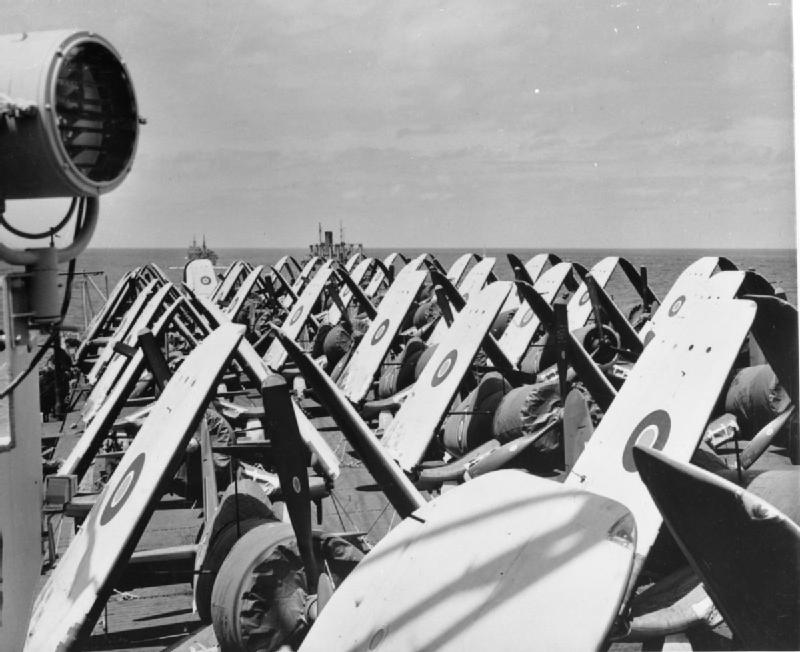
HMS Smiter, homeward bound with a consignment of Chance-Vought Corsair aircraft

Upon concluding operations at RN Air Section Brunswick, the squadron proceeded to RN Air Section Norfolk, at USNAS Norfolk, on 2 June. On the morning of 4 June the escort carrier HMS Smiter, embarked the eighteen Vought Corsair and personnel of 1841 Naval Air Squadron, for ferrying to the UK and she sailed for New York Harbor later that day. The carrier departed New York on 8 June 1944 for Liverpool, England. On reaching the city, 1841 Naval Air Squadron was disembarked, earmarked for RNAS Ayr (HMS Wagtail), Scotland.

The squadron flew out to join the Illustrious-class aircraft carrier HMS Formidable (67), on 26 June, which shortly afterwards sailed from the Clyde, arriving at Scapa Flow, in the Orkney Islands to prepare for operations with the Home Fleet. 1841 Naval Air Squadron then disembarked to RNAS Hatston (HMS Sparrowhawk), Mainland, Orkney. In July and August of 1944, the squadron participated in providing fighter escort for Operations Mascot and Goodwood respectively, targeting the German battleship Tirpitz, the latter alongside 1842 Naval Air Squadron and together were officially assigned as the 6th Naval Fighter Wing.

It embarked on a voyage with the carrier to the Far East, making brief stops on land at Gibraltar and Dekheila. The planned operations in Crete were aborted due to the necessity of repairs for the carrier in Gibraltar. Consequently, the commanding officer proceeded to Colombo, Ceylon, while the squadron disembarked to RN Air Section Gibraltar. In November, the majority of the squadron travelled overland to RNAS Dekheila (HMS Grebe), Egypt, to await the ship's arrival.

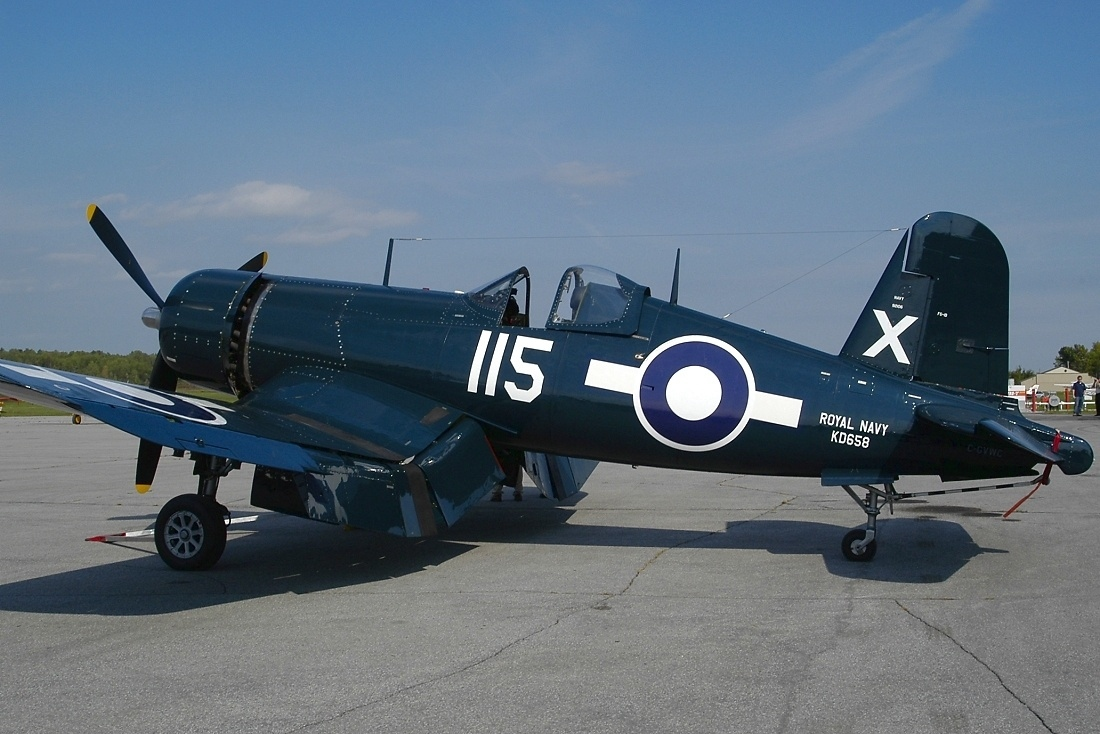
Vought (Goodyear) FG-1D Corsair Mk IV

Upon reaching the Far East, the squadron disembarked at RNAS Puttalam (HMS Rajaliya), Ceylon, on 8 February 1945. On arrival, the squadron underwent re-equipping with new variant of Vought Corsair. These were the Goodyear built FG-1D variant, designated Corsair Mk IV by the Fleet Air Arm. In the months of April and May, the squadron took part in Operation Iceberg, focusing on assaults against the Sakishima Gunto archipelago located in the East China Sea. HMS Formidable reached Sydney on 31 May, after which her squadrons were disembarked at RNAS Jervis Bay (HMS Nabswick), returning to the carrier on 22 June.

On 28 June, the 6th Naval Fighter Wing was officially dissolved as the Admiralty transitioned to the United States model of Carrier Air Groups. In this system, all squadrons assigned to a specific aircraft carrier were organised into a Carrier Air Group (CAG). The aircraft carrier HMS Formidable was designated to No. 2 CAG, which included 1841, 1842, and 848 Naval Air Squadrons. Shortly prior to V-J Day, airstrikes were executed in the Tokyo region. In one such operation on August 9, Lieutenant R.H. Gray, DSC, RCNVR, tragically lost his life while engaging a Japanese destroyer. He was later posthumously honoured with the Victoria Cross for his bravery. Following the conclusion of the Second World War, the squadron abandoned its aircraft in Australia and its personnel boarded HMS Victorious for their journey to the United Kingdom, where the squadron was officially disbanded upon arrival on 31 October 1945.

== Royal Naval Volunteer Reserve Air Squadron ==
=== Anti-submarine squadron ===
1841 Naval Air Squadron was reestablished at RNAS Stretton (HMS Blackcap), Cheshire, England, on 18 August 1952, serving as an Anti-Submarine unit within the Northern Air Division of the Royal Navy Volunteer Reserve, under the command of Lieutenant Commander(A) K. H. Tickle, RNVR.

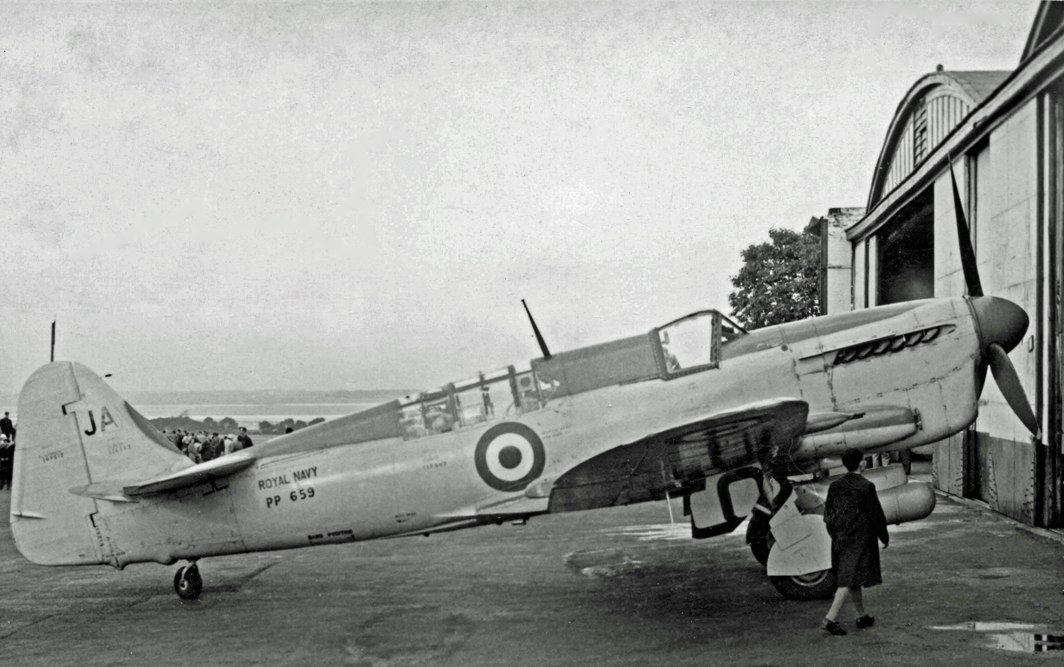
Fairey Firefly T.Mk 3 observer trainer of 1841 Naval Air Squadron, RNVR, at RAF Hooton Park

The squadron's initial fleet consisted of five Fairey Firefly FR.I, a carrier-borne fighter/reconnaissance aircraft, which were subsequently substituted in March 1955 with eight Fairey Firefly AS.Mk 6 anti-submarine warfare variant. By December 1955, the squadron transitioned to a new configuration, incorporating six Grumman Avenger AS.5 anti-submarine aircraft into its operations. 1841 Naval Air Squadron disbanded on 10 March 1957 as part of that year's defence cuts.

== Aircraft flown ==
1841 Naval Air Squadron flew a number of variants a single aircraft type during the Second World War:

- Vought Corsair Mk I fighter-bomber (March - April 1944)
- Vought Corsair Mk II fighter-bomber (March 1944 - February 1945)
- Vought Corsair Mk III fighter-bomber (April - July 1944)
- Vought Corsair Mk IV fighter-bomber (February - October 1945)
- Fairey Firefly FR.I fighter/reconnaissance aircraft (August 1952 - June 1954)
- Fairey Firefly T.Mk 3 anti-submarine warfare training aircraft (August 1952 - May 1953)
- North American Harvard IIB advanced trainer aircraft (August 1952 - January 1955)
- North American Harvard III advanced trainer aircraft (July 1953 - February 1954)
- Avro Anson Mk I multirole trainer aircraft (August - November 1953)
- Percival Sea Prince T1 transport aircraft (November 1953 - April 1956)
- Fairey Firefly AS.Mk 6 anti-submarine aircraft (March - December 1955)
- Grumman Avenger AS.Mk 5 anti-submarine strike aircraft (December 1955 - January 1957)
- Fairey Firefly T.Mk 2 armed operational training aircraft (January 1963 - October 1955)

== Battle honours ==
The following Battle Honours have been awarded to 1841 Naval Air Squadron:

- Norway 1944
- Okinawa 1945
- Japan 1945

== Assignments ==
1841 Naval Air Squadron was assigned as needed to form part of a number of larger units:

- 6th Naval Fighter Wing (14 August 1944 - 30 June 1945)
- 2nd Carrier Air Group (30 June - 31 October 1945)

== Naval air stations ==
1841 Naval Air Squadron operated from a number of naval air stations of the Royal Navy in the UK and overseas, and a Royal Navy fleet and escort carrier:

1944 - 1945

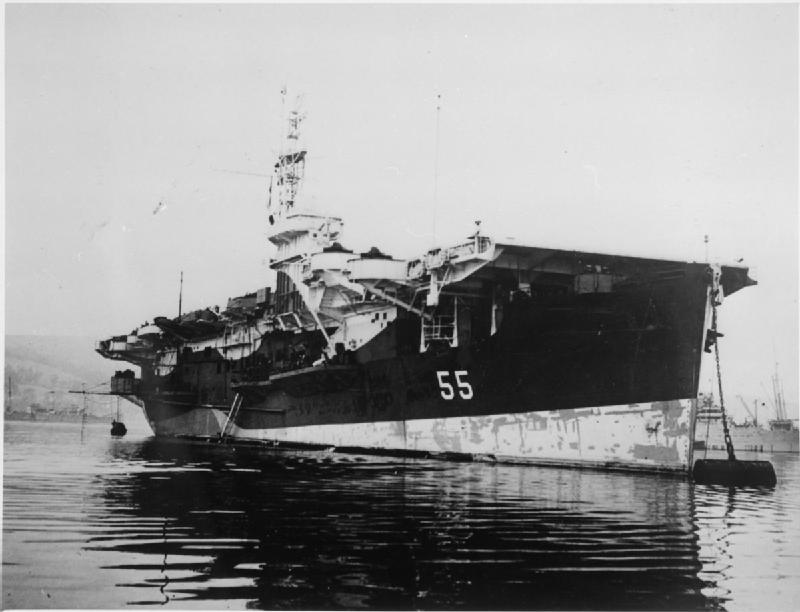
HMS Smiter

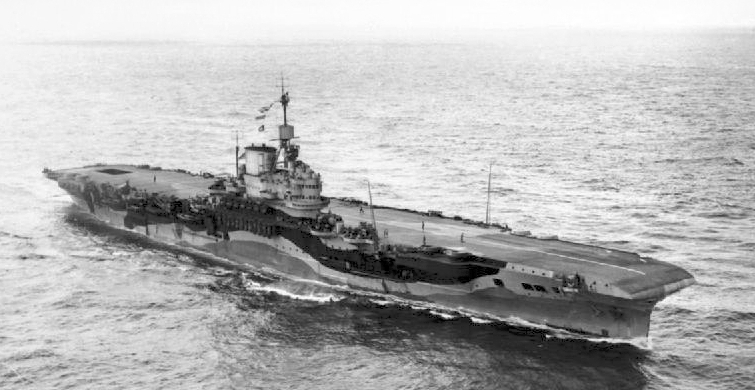
HMS Formidable

- RN Air Section Brunswick, Maine, (1 March - 2 June 1944)
- RN Air Section Norfolk, Virginia, (Detachment Deck Landing Training USS Charger/USS Kasaan Bay) (11 - 26 May 1944)
- RN Air Section Norfolk, Virginia, (2 - 5 June 1944)
- HMS Smiter (5 - 22 June 1944)
- Royal Naval Air Station Ayr (HMS Wagtail), South Ayrshire, (22 - 26 June 1944)
- HMS Formidable (26 June - 5 July 1944)
- Royal Naval Air Station Hatston (HMS Sparrowhawk), Mainland, Orkney, (5 - 10 July 1944)
- HMS Formidable (10 - 20 July 1944)
- Royal Naval Air Station Eglinton (HMS Gannet), County Londonderry, (20 July - 7 August 1944)
- HMS Formidable (7 August - 2 September 1944)
  - Royal Air Force Skeabrae, Mainland, Orkney, (Detachment four aircraft 14 - 18 August 1944)
- Royal Naval Air Station Donibristle (HMS Merlin), Fife, (2 - 16 September 1944)
- HMS Formidable (16 September 44
  - RN Air Section Gibraltar, Gibraltar, (Detachment four aircraft 26 September - 17 October 1944)
- RN Air Section Gibraltar, Gibraltar, (18 October - 13 November 1944)
- transit (13 - 15 November 1944)
- Royal Naval Air Station Dekheila (HMS Grebe), Egypt, (15 November 1944 - 27 January 1945)
  - Detachment: RN Air Section Gibraltar, Gibraltar, (13 November 1944 - 14 January 1945)
  - HMS Formidable (14 - 27 January 1945)
- HMS Formidable (27 January - 8 February 1945)
- Royal Naval Air Station Puttalam (HMS Rajaliya), Ceylon, (8 - 22 February 1945)
- HMS Formidable (22 February - 1 June 1945)
- Royal Naval Air Station Jervis Bay (HMS Nabswick), Jervis Bay Territory, (Detachment 22 - 24 March 1945)
- Royal Naval Air Station Jervis Bay (HMS Nabswick), Jervis Bay Territory, (1 - 22 June 1945)
- HMS Formidable (22 June - 23 August 1945)
- Royal Naval Air Station Nowra (HMS Nabbington), New South Wales, (23 August - 25 September 1945)
- HMS Victorious (crews) (25 September - 31 October 1945)
- disbanded UK - (31 October 1945)

1952 - 1957

- Royal Naval Air Station Stretton (HMS Blackcap), Cheshire, (18 August 1952 - 10 March 1957)
  - Valkenburg Naval Air Base, Katwijk, Netherlands, (Detachment 12 - 13 September 1953, 28 - 29 April 1956)
  - Annual training
    - Royal Naval Air Station Eglinton (HMS Gannet), County Londonderry, (20 June - 4 July 1953)
    - Royal Naval Air Station Ford (HMS Peregrine), Sussex, (26 - 27 September 1953
    - Royal Naval Air Station Hal Far (HMS Falcon), Malta, (22 August - 5 September 1954, 31 May - 10 June 1955, 22 June - 6 July 1956)
- disbanded - (10 March 1957)

== Commanding officers ==
List of commanding officers of 1841 Naval Air Squadron with date of appointment:

1944 - 1945

- Lieutenant Commander(A) R.L. Bigg-Wither, DSC & Bar, RN, from 1 March 1944
- Lieutenant R.H. Gray, RCNVR, from 30 September 1944
- Lieutenant Commander(A) R.L. Bigg-Wither, DSC & Bar, RN, from 8 February 1945
- disbanded - (31 October 1945)

1952 - 1957

- Lieutenant Commander(A) K.H. Tickle, RNVR, from 18 August 1952
- Lieutenant Commander(A) F. Morrell, RNVR, from 22 July 1955
- Lieutenant Commander(A) A.E. Frost, RNVR, from 1 October 1956
- disbanded - 10 March 1957

Note: Abbreviation (A) signifies Air Branch of the RN or RNVR.
