= Laker Band =

Pep band

Los Angeles Laker Band
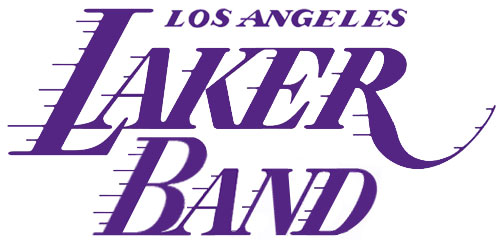
- Location: Crypto.com Arena; Los Angeles, California
- Founded: October 16, 1979
- Director: Rick Cox

The Los Angeles Laker Band is a subset of the USC Trojan Marching Band that plays at Lakers home games. Created in 1979 at the request of Lakers owner Dr. Jerry Buss, this brass and rhythm ensemble performs at every Laker home game, including the playoffs, finals and regularly performs the national anthem before the game on the Crypto.com Arena court. The group is the only one of its kind in the NBA: a dedicated band that performs at every game in its own section. The band sits and performs in section 308. The Laker Band comprises nine trumpets, six or seven trombones, a bass guitar, and a drum set.

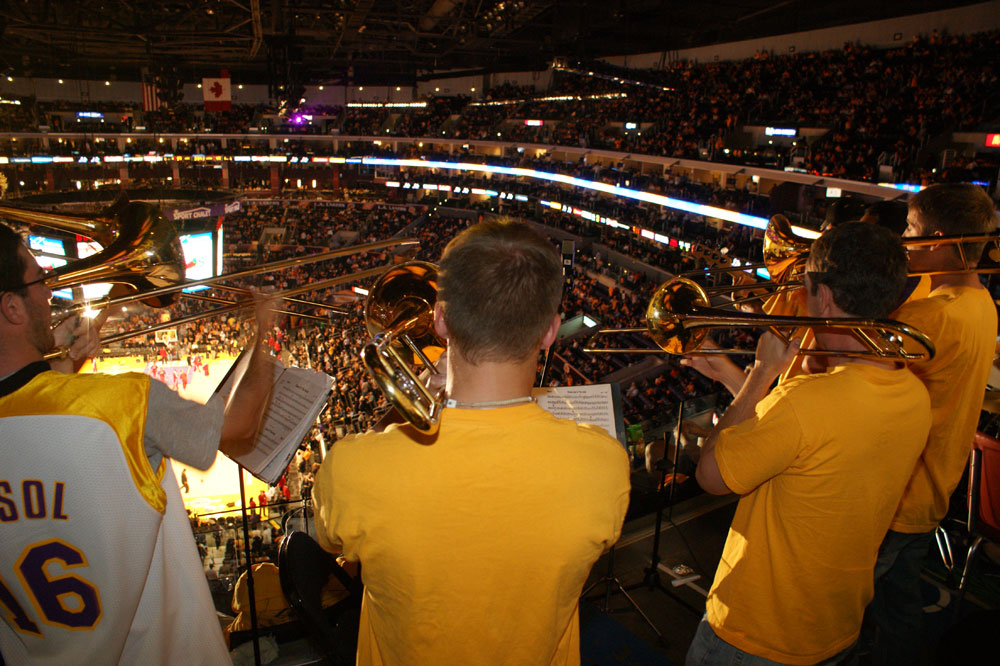
The Laker Band performs before a game.

The band has been featured in the championship parade in downtown Los Angeles when the Lakers win the NBA title. Band members and the Laker Girls ride atop firetrucks for the parade down Figueroa Street.

== Performance at Games ==
The Laker Band has a selection of over 70 arrangements of popular songs that they can perform at any game. The band typically plays “Gonna Fly Now” (the theme from the movie Rocky) before tip-off, a few songs toward the end of halftime, and a concert after the game. The Laker Band drum set and bass guitar also provide the rhythm tune for the “Defense” chant when the Lakers’ opponent has the ball and the brass section provides the “Charge” at the beginning of each period of play.

== Repertoire ==
Following is some of the Laker Band's more frequently performed songs. The majority are arranged by USC Band arranger Tony Fox.

- Just a Gigolo - Last song of the post game concert. A favorite of Dr. Buss.
- In the Stone
- California Love
- Gonna Fly Now
- Tusk - Usually right before the beginning of the 3rd period.
- Heartbreaker - Performed after Lakers losses.
- Dance to the Music
- Toxicity
- Deliver Me
- I Kissed a Girl
- The Kids Aren't Alright
- The Star-Spangled Banner
