= Homage (feudal) =

Medieval oath of allegiance

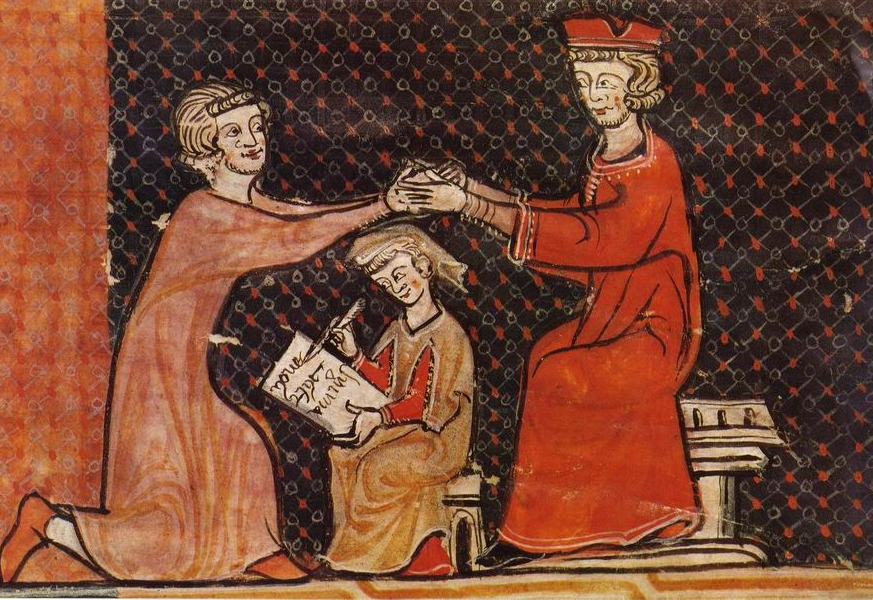
Homage ceremony in the Middle Ages

Homage (/ˈhɒmɪdʒ/ or /oʊˈmɑːʒ/) (from Medieval Latin hominaticum, lit. "pertaining to a man") in the Middle Ages was the ceremony in which a feudal tenant or vassal pledged reverence and submission to his feudal lord, receiving in exchange the symbolic title to his new position (investiture). It was a symbolic acknowledgement to the lord that the vassal was, literally, his man (homme). The oath known as "fealty" implied lesser obligations than did "homage". Further, one could swear "fealty" to many different overlords with respect to different land holdings, but "homage" could be performed to only a single liege, as one could not be "his man" (i.e., committed to military service) to more than one "liege lord".

The ceremony of homage was used in many regions of Europe to symbolically bind two men together. The vassal to-be would go down on his knee and place his palms together as if praying. The lord to-be would place his hands over the hands of the vassal, while the vassal made a short declaration of belonging to the lord (see image). The new chief and subordinate would sometimes then kiss each other on the mouth (the osculum) to symbolize their friendship. In this way one of the fundamental bonds of feudal society was sealed.

It is likely that the ceremony of homage, as well as the institution itself, was derived in part from the ceremony of recommendation that had been in use since the early Middle Ages. The bonds of homage involved rights and obligations for both vassal and lord. The lord promised to provide protection and assistance to his vassal, as well as to provide for his upkeep, often by conceding rights over a piece of the lord's manorial holdings. The vassal owed obedience and devotion, as well as counsel and aid in times of war, to the lord. The latter could be fulfilled by military provisions as well as presence at the lord's council. This bond of mutual obligation was in many ways modelled after the bond of son and father.

There have been some conflicts about obligations of homage in history. For example, the Angevin monarchs of England were sovereign in England, i.e., they had no duty of homage regarding those holdings; but they were not sovereign regarding their French holdings. Henry II was king of England, but he was merely duke of Normandy and Aquitaine and count of Anjou and Poitou. The Capetian kings in Paris, though weaker militarily than many of their vassals until the reign of King Philip Augustus, claimed a right of homage. The usual oath was therefore modified by Henry to add the qualification "for the lands I hold overseas." The implication was that no "knights service" was owed for the English lands.

After King John of England was forced to surrender Normandy to Philip in 1204, English magnates with holdings on both sides of the Channel were faced with conflict. John still expected to recover his ancestral lands, and those English lords who held lands in Normandy would have to choose sides. Many were forced to abandon their continental holdings. Two of the most powerful magnates, Robert de Beaumont, 4th Earl of Leicester, and William Marshal, 1st Earl of Pembroke, negotiated an arrangement with the French king that if John had not recovered Normandy in a year-and-a-day, they would do homage to Philip. At first that seemed to satisfy John, but eventually, as a price for making peace with the French king to keep his lands, Pembroke fell out of favour with John.

The conflict between the French monarchs and the Angevin kings of England continued through the 13th century. When Edward I of England was asked to provide military service to Philip III of France in his war with Aragon in 1285, Edward made preparations to provide service from Gascony (but not England – he had not done "homage", and thus owed no service to France for the English lands). Edward's Gascon subjects did not want to go to war with their southern neighbours on behalf of France, and they undoubtedly appealed to Edward that as a sovereign, he owed the French king no service at all. A truce was arranged, however, before Edward had to decide what to do. But when Philip III died, and his son Philip IV ascended the French throne in 1286, Edward dutifully but reluctantly performed homage for the sake of peace. In doing so, Edward added yet another qualification – that the duty owed was "according to the terms of the peace made between our ancestors".

== See also ==
- Allegiance
- Charge
- Duty
- Fealty
- Feudalism in the Holy Roman Empire
- Honor
