= 1842 Naval Air Squadron =

Inactive Royal Navy Fleet Air Arm and Reserve Air Squadron

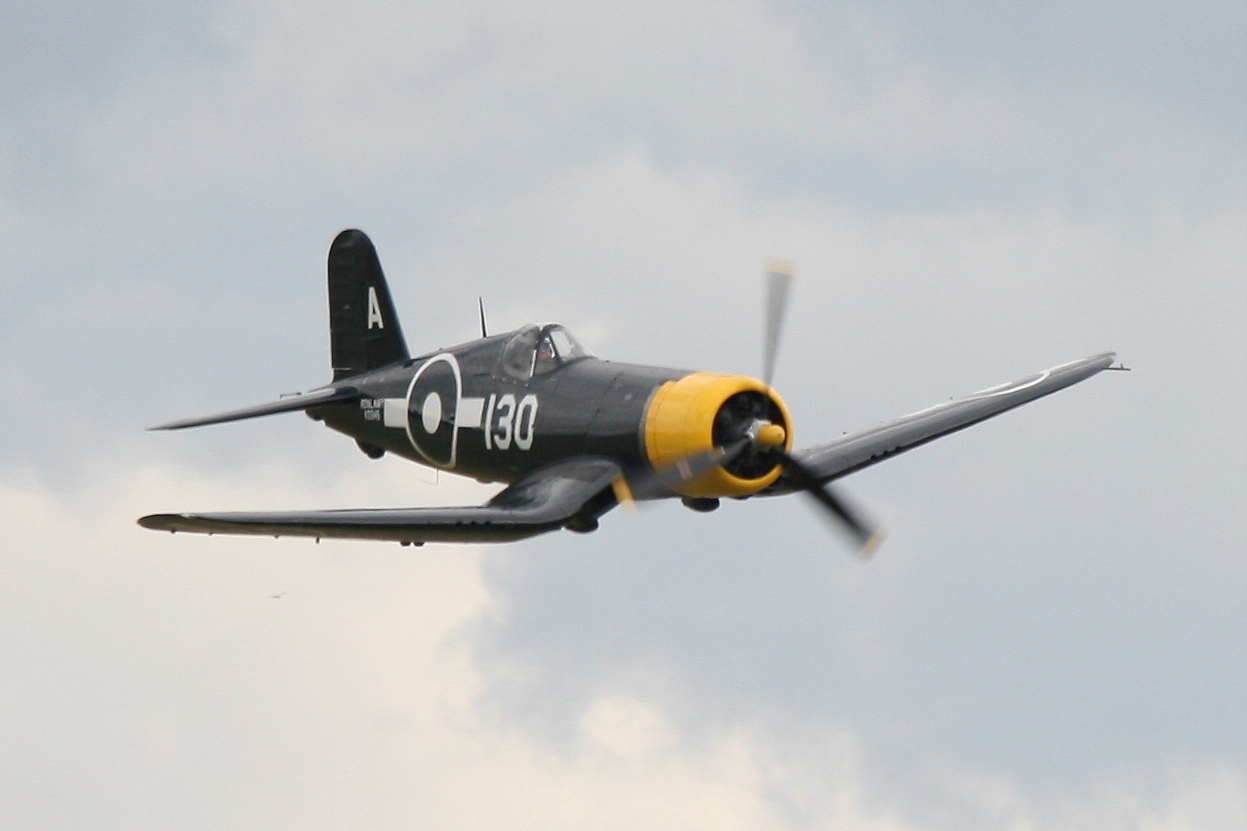
- Goodyear FG-1D Corsair Mk IV; an example of the type used by 1842 NAS
- Active: 1944–1945; 1953–1957
- Disbanded: 10 March 1957
- Country: United Kingdom
- Branch: Royal Navy
- Type: Single-seat fighter squadron; Royal Naval Volunteer Reserve Air Squadron
- Role: Carrier-based fighter squadron; Anti-submarine squadron
- Size: Eighteen aircraft (1944-45); Shared aircraft pool (RNVR)
- Part of: Fleet Air Arm
- Home station: See Naval air stations section for full list.
- Engagements: World War II: European theatre of World War II; Operation Goodwood; Pacific War; Operation Iceberg; Air raids on Japan
- Battle honours: Norway 1944; Okinawa 1945; Japan 1945

Commanders
- Notable commanders: Lieutenant Commander(A) D.G. Parker, DSC, RNVR

Insignia
- Identification Markings: Single letters; A1+; A+ (May 1944); 129-146 (March 1945)
- Fin Carrier Code: X (March 1945)

Aircraft flown
- Fighter: Vought Corsair

1842 Naval Air Squadron (1842 NAS) was a Fleet Air Arm (FAA) naval air squadron of the United Kingdom's Royal Navy (RN) between 1944 and 1945 and then a Royal Naval Volunteer Reserve Air Squadron from 1953 to 1957. The squadron was formed as a fighter squadron at RN Air Section Brunswick in April 1944. Initially, it was based at HMS Blackcap, RNAS Stretton, before relocating to HMS Gannet, RNAS Eglinton. In August, the squadron joined the 6th Naval Fighter Wing and embarked in HMS Formidable, where it took part in operations against the Tirpitz. Following this, the carrier proceeded to the Far East, and the squadron carried out missions over Sakishima Gunto. In June 1945, it became integrated into the 2nd Carrier Air Group, engaging in operations around Tokyo. After the conclusion of the war, the squadron's personnel returned to the United Kingdom aboard HMS Victorious, disbanding upon their arrival in October 1945. It reformed as a Royal Naval Volunteer Reserve Air Branch anti-submarine squadron, in the Channel Air Division, from 1953 and disbanded in 1957.

== History ==
=== Single-seat fighter squadron (1944-1945) ===
February 1944 saw the personnel for 1842 Naval Air Squadron gather at Royal Naval Air Establishment (RNAE) Townhill Camp (HMS Waxwing), Dunfermline, Fife, Scotland, in preparation for their journey to the United States. It formed on 1 April 1944 in the United States at RN Air Section Brunswick, which was located at United States Naval Air Station (USNAS) Brunswick, Maine, as a Single-seat Fighter Squadron, under the command of Lieutenant Commander(A) A.McD. Garland, DSC, RNVR.

It was equipped with eighteen Vought Corsair aircraft, an American carrier-borne fighter-bomber. These were the Brewster built F3A-1 and F3A-1D variant, designated Corsair Mk III by the Fleet Air Arm. Following the initial familiarisation, the flight training encompassed navigation drills, low-altitude maneuvers, formation flying, Air combat manoeuvring and Aerodrome Dummy Deck Landing (ADDL) exercises. On 23 May, the squadron relocated to the US Naval Auxiliary Airfield (USNAA) Bar Harbor, Bar Harbor, Maine, for a week of both daytime and nighttime ADDL training, before returning to Brunswick on 31.

The following day, the squadron pilots commenced their flights to the aircraft carrier, USS Charger, which was the nominated training carrier operating off the coast of Maine, to complete the necessary landings required for certification in carrier deck landings. On completion of working up at USNAS Brunswick the squadron flew to RN Air Section Norfolk, at USNAS Norfolk, on 27 June.

Upon the arrival of all the squadron aircraft, the RN Air Section made the necessary preparations for their embarkation onto the Ruler-class escort carrier, HMS Rajah. Upon the conclusion of loading, HMS Rajah departed for New York Harbor, where it joined the eastbound convoy TCU.30 on 2 July. This convoy primarily consisted of troopships, accompanied by a limited number of merchant vessels. HMS Rajah reached Liverpool, England, on 12 July, where it proceeded to unload supplies and the aircraft belonging to 1842 Naval Air Squadron.

The squadron was initially stationed at RNAS Stretton (HMS Blackcap), Cheshire, England, where it transitioned from eighteen Mk. III Vought Corsair to eighteen Mk. II Vought Corsair, prior to its departure on the 21 for RNAS Eglinton (HMS Gannet), County Londonderry, Northern Ireland. These were the Chance Vought manufactured F3A-1 and F3A-1D variant. This move was part of the squadron's preparation for further training in anticipation of joining the Fleet Carrier, HMS Formidable. On 7 August the squadron embarked in HMS Formidable. Following a brief period of flight training, it reached Scapa Flow on 11 August to make preparations for Operation Goodwood. On 14 August, 1841 and 1842 Naval Air Squadrons were officially assigned to the 6th Naval Fighter Wing. The squadron experienced the loss of multiple aircraft while conducting assaults on the German battleship Tirpitz, which was positioned in a Norwegian fjord during the month of August.

HMS Formidable later set sail for the Far East; however, the aircraft carrier required a refit in Gibraltar. As a result, the squadron disembarked at RN Air Section Gibraltar, while a contingent proceeded to HMS Grebe, the Royal Naval Air Station at Dekheila, Egypt, to await the ship's readiness. The refitting process was scheduled to last four months, during which the Wing was disembarked on 21 September. In early November, several aircraft were relocated to RNAS Dekhelia, commencing the journey on 13 November. The detachment returned to RAF North Front, Gibraltar (the location of the Air Section), at the beginning of January and subsequently re-embarked on HMS Formidable later that month.

Upon reaching the Far East, the squadron disembarked at RNAS Puttalam (HMS Rajaliya), Ceylon, on 8 February 1945. On arrival, the squadron underwent re-equipping with a new variant of Vought Corsair. These were the Goodyear built FG-1D variant, designated Corsair Mk IV by the Fleet Air Arm.

In the months of April and May, the squadron took part in Operation Iceberg, focusing on assaults against the Sakishima Gunto archipelago located in the East China Sea. On the 4 and 9 of May, HMS Formidable came under Kamikaze attack, leading to the loss of multiple aircraft. HMS Formidable reached Sydney, Australia, on 31 May, after which her squadrons were disembarked at RNAS Jervis Bay (HMS Nabswick), the location of MONAB V, New South Wales, returning on 22 June. On 28 June, the 6th Naval Fighter Wing was officially dissolved as the Admiralty transitioned to the United States model of Carrier Air Groups. In this system, all squadrons assigned to a specific aircraft carrier were organised into a Carrier Air Group (CAG). The aircraft carrier HMS Formidable was designated to No. 2 CAG, which included 1841, 1842, and 848 Naval Air Squadrons.

In the final weeks of the conflict, airstrikes were executed in the Tokyo region, with two pilots fortunate enough to be rescued by the US Navy's submarine Scabbardfish after they were compelled to ditch in Owase Harbour, Japan, on 28 July. Following the conclusion of the Second World War, the squadron abandoned its aircraft in Australia and its personnel boarded HMS Victorious for their journey to the United Kingdom, where the squadron was officially disbanded upon arrival on 31 October 1945.

== Royal Naval Volunteer Reserve Air Squadron ==
=== Anti-submarine squadron ===
On 28 March 1953, 1843 Naval Air Squadron reformed at RNAS Ford (HMS Peregrine), Sussex, England, as a Royal Naval Volunteer Reserve anti-submarine squadron in the Channel Air Division, under the command of Lieutenant Commander(A) R.A. Jameson, RNVR. It was essentially a renaming of 1840A Naval Air Squadron. The squadron shared a pool of aircraft with 1840 Naval Air Squadron. The RNVR squadron disbanded on 10 March 1957 under the White Paper defence cuts of that year.

== Aircraft flown ==
1842 Naval Air Squadron flew three variants of only one aircraft type:

- Vought Corsair Mk III fighter-bomber (April - June 1944)
- Vought Corsair Mk II fighter-bomber (July 1944 - February 1945)
- Vought Corsair Mk IV fighter-bomber (February - October 1945)

== Battle honours ==
The following Battle Honours have been awarded to 1842 Naval Air Squadron

- Norway 1944
- Okinawa 1945
- Japan 1945

== Assignments ==
1842 Naval Air Squadron was assigned as needed to form part of a number of larger units:

- 6th Naval Fighter Wing (14 August 1944 - 30 June 1945)
- 2nd Carrier Air Group (30 June - 31 October 1945)

== Naval air stations ==
1842 Naval Air Squadron operated from a number of naval air stations of the Royal Navy in the UK and overseas, and a Royal Navy fleet and escort carrier:

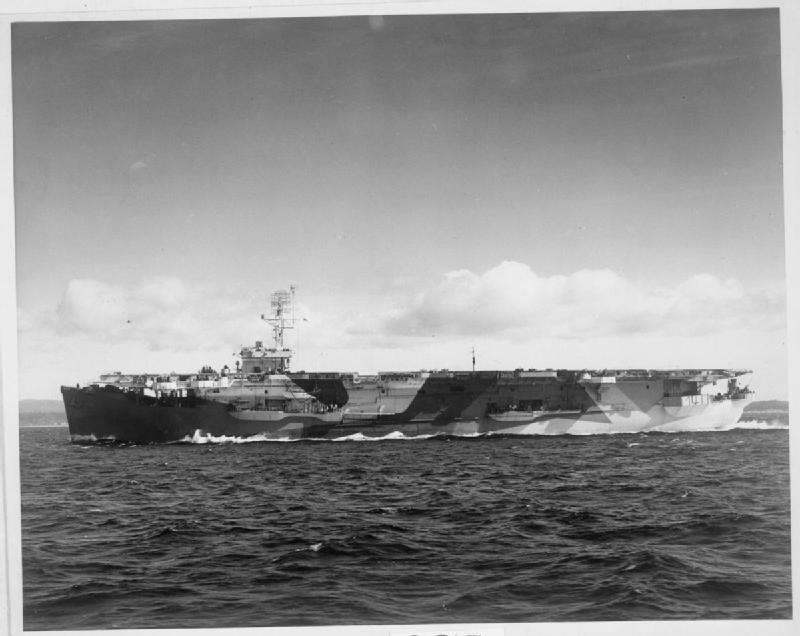
HMS Rajah

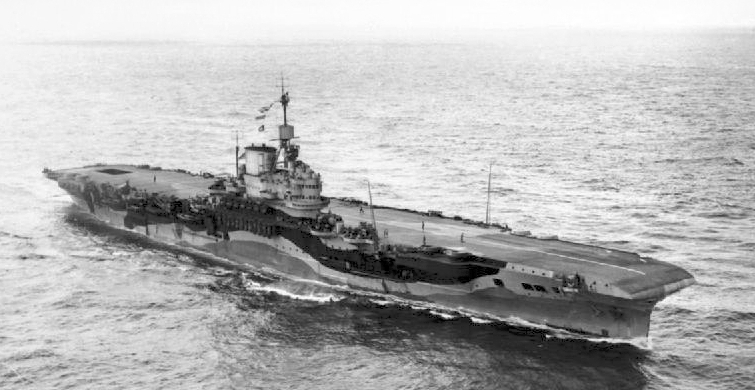
HMS Formidable

1944 - 1945

- RN Air Section Brunswick, Maine, (1 April - 27 June 1944)
  - RN Air Section Norfolk, Virginia, (Detachment Deck Landing Training (DLT) USS Charger 1 - 7 June 1944)
- RN Air Section Norfolk, Virginia, (27 - 29 June 1944)
- HMS Rajah (29 June - 13 July 1944)
- Royal Naval Air Station Stretton (HMS Blackcap), Cheshire, (13 - 21 July 1944)
- Royal Naval Air Station Eglinton (HMS Gannet), County Londonderry, (21 July - 7 August 1944)
- HMS Formidable (7 - 14 August 1944)
- Royal Naval Air Station Hatston (HMS Sparrowhawk), Mainland, Orkney, (14 - 18 August 1944)
- HMS Formidable (18 August - 2 September 1944)
- Royal Naval Air Station Donibristle (HMS Merlin), Fife, (2 - 16 September 1944)
- HMS Formidable (16 September - 19 October 1944)
  - RN Air Section Gibraltar, Gibraltar, (Detachment two aircraft 21 September - 18 October 1944)
- RN Air Section Gibraltar, Gibraltar, (19 October 1944 - 14 January 1945)
  - Detachment: transit (13 - 15 November 1944)
  - Royal Naval Air Station Dekheila (HMS Grebe), Alexandria, Egypt, (15 November 1944 - 27 January 1945)
- HMS Formidable (14 January - 8 February 1945)
- Royal Naval Air Station Puttalam (HMS Rajaliya), Ceylon, (8 - 22 February 1945)
- HMS Formidable (22 February - 1 June 1945)
  - Royal Naval Air Station Jervis Bay (HMS Nabswick), Jervis Bay Territory, (Detachment 22 - 24 March 1945)
- Royal Naval Air Station Jervis Bay (HMS Nabswick), Jervis Bay Territory, (1 - 22 June 1945)
- HMS Formidable (22 June - 23 August 1945)
- Royal Naval Air Station Nowra (HMS Nabbington), New South Wales, (23 August - 25 September 1945)
- HMS Victorious (crews) (25 September - 31 October 1945)
- disbanded UK - (31 October 1945)

1953 - 1957

- Royal Naval Air Station Ford (HMS Peregrine), Sussex, (ex-1840A Naval Air Squadron 28 March 1953 - 10 March 1957)
  - Annual training:
    - Royal Naval Air Station Eglinton (HMS Gannet), County Londonderry, (22 August - 5 September 1953)
    - Royal Naval Air Station Hal Far (HMS Falcon), Malta, (8 - 22 May 1954)
    - Royal Naval Air Station Eglinton (HMS Gannet), County Londonderry, (20 August - 3 September 1955)
- disbanded - (10 March 1957)

== Commanding officers ==
List of commanding officers of 1842 Naval Air Squadron with date of appointment:

1944 - 1945

- Lieutenant Commander(A) A.McD. Garland, DSC, RNVR, from 1 April 1944 (KiA 16 April 1945)
- Lieutenant Commander(A) D.G. Parker, DSC, RNVR, from 17 April 1945
- disbanded - 31 October 1945

1953 - 1957

- Lieutenant Commander(A) R.A. Jameson, RNVR, from 28 March 1953
- disbanded - 10 March 1957

Note: Abbreviation (A) signifies Air Branch of the RN or RNVR.
