= Super-Charged network =

Super-Charged network or Super-Charger network, is a telecommunications term that refers to a particular standardized implementation of a 3GPP 3G telecommunications network. 3GPP has standardized Super-Charger networks in TS 23.116, the Super-Charger technical realization, and defines a Super-Charged network as a "UMTS network in which the Super-Charger mechanism is being used to optimise mobility management signalling."

== Background ==
A regular UMTS network can be retrofitted to provide Super-Charger support by providing Super-Charger support within each network entity. Once a network entity has been modified to support Super-Charger functionality it is referred to as a Super-Charged network entity. For example, a Home Location Register (HLR) with Super-Charger functionality would be referred to as a Super-Charged HLR.

In a regular telecommunication network environment, transferring from a previous network to a serving network (i.e. handing off) uses a substantial amount of signalling traffic. For 3GPP networks, when the user equipment (UE) enters the serving network from the previous network, the UE triggers a "Location Update" request to be sent from the UE to the serving network's visitor location register (VLR). The serving network's VLR passes the Location Update request to the UE's home network's HLR. The HLR then performs two operations: 1) sends a "Cancel Location" message to the previous network's VLR, in an effort to remove the subscriber's data from the previous network, and 2) sends an Insert Subscriber Data message to the serving network's VLR, in an effort to add the subscriber's information to the serving network. After acknowledgments from the respective VLRs have been received for these steps, the HLR will send a Location Update confirmation back to the serving network, which forwards it to the UE, thereby informing the UE that the location update processing is complete by all parties involved.

However, when the UE jumps back and forth between the previous and serving networks, the signalling overhead resulting from the frequent Location Update messages is substantial and the resulting traffic is burdensome to the network.

== Super-Charger functionality ==
A solution was implemented with the Super-Charger realization in an effort to reduce telecommunications signaling traffic. The general concept behind the Super-Charger network is that the location registers in any visiting network do not delete subscriber data even after a subscriber leaves their control, by, for instance, exiting their coverage area. This allows the UE to jump back and forth between the networks and, since the previous network, serving network, and home network's HLR are Super-Charged and maintaining copies of the subscriber information, the HLR does not have to re-send the subscriber information or Cancel Location request messages.

== Considerations ==
- Outdated subscriber information in visiting networks

Outdated subscriber information is a concern if the UE does not re-enter the previous visiting network after an extended period of time. To prevent out dating of the subscriber data, an age indicator is associated with the subscriber information maintained in all location registers. If the HLR deems that the age indicator in a visiting network is too old, or determines the subscriber's information has changed since the visiting network last received the information, the HLR will send the subscriber data like normal.

- Storage capacities in visiting networks

If the visiting networks are maintaining subscriber information for all subscribers that enter and then subsequently exit their coverage area, the visiting networks will have to maintain a significant amount of subscriber information. Therefore, visiting networks should implement database maintenance measures to ensure outdated and unused subscriber information is removed. This will free up memory for new subscriber information.

- Communication between Super-Charged entities and non-Super-Charged entities

After an HLR receives an Update Location request from a visiting network, the HLR must be able to identify whether the new and old visiting networks are Super-Charged or not. If the old visiting network is Super-Charged, the HLR does not send a Cancel Location message. If the old visiting network is not Super-Charged, the HLR sends the Cancel Location message. If the new visiting network is Super-Charged and has previously received the subscriber information and it is not outdated, the HLR does not send an Insert Subscriber Data request. Otherwise, the HLR will send the Insert Subscriber Data request.

- Determining whether a subscriber information deletion is due to database maintenance or instructed by a HLR

Further signalling traffic reductions can occur by not sending acknowledgements. Typically, when a HLR instructs a subscriber purge (via a Cancel Location message) to a visiting network, the visiting network purges the subscriber information and sends an acknowledgment back to the HLR. The networks can further cut back on signalling traffic by not returning an acknowledgment, and just having the HLR assume the purge was completed. However, since Super-Charged visiting networks can purge subscriber data on their own due to periodic database cleanups, the visiting network register must identify whether the subscriber purge is externally instructed. If the purge is externally instructed, no acknowledgment is returned. If the purge is internally instructed, an acknowledgment is sent to the HLR.

== See also ==
- GSM
