= 6th Naval Fighter Wing =

Royal Navy Fleet Air Arm aircraft wing

- White Ensign
- Active: 28 February 1944 – June 1945
- Country: United Kingdom
- Branch: Royal Navy
- Type: Naval fighter Wing
- Role: Fleet fighter operations
- Size: One / two squadrons
- Part of: Fleet Air Arm
- Home station: RNAS Burscough
- Aircraft: Vought Corsair
- Engagements: World War II: European theatre of World War II; Operation Pedal; Operation Crimson; Operation Mascot; Operation Goodwood; Pacific War; Operation Iceberg

Commanders
- Notable commanders: Commander H. P. Sears, RN; Commander T. G. C. Jameson, RN; Lieutenant Commander (A) T. W. Harrington, RN

Insignia
- Wing Code: L

6th Naval Fighter Wing ("6 Wing") was a Fleet Air Arm fighter formation of the Royal Navy during the Second World War. It was formed at RNAS Burscough in February 1944, initially around 1837 Naval Air Squadron for service in the Eastern Fleet. After 1837 Naval Air Squadron was transferred to the 47th Naval Fighter Wing, the 6th Wing was re-formed in August 1944 with 1841 and 1842 Naval Air Squadrons aboard HMS Formidable. The wing participated in attacks on the German battleship Tirpitz before deploying to the Pacific with the British Pacific Fleet. It participated in Operation Iceberg against Japanese positions in the Sakishima Islands before being disbanded in June 1945 and its squadrons incorporated into the 2nd Carrier Air Group.

== History ==
=== First formation ===
The 6th Naval Fighter Wing was formed at RNAS Burscough, Lancashire, on 28 February 1944, initially consisting solely of 1837 Naval Air Squadron, equipped with the Vought Corsair. Commander H.P. Sears, RN, was appointed the first wing leader. The squadron embarked in the Ruler-class escort carrier HMS Atheling and sailed for Ceylon, where it subsequently transferred to the name ship of her class HMS Illustrious in June.

While serving with HMS Illustrious, 1837 Squadron took part in Operation Pedal, the Allied carrier operation against Japanese installations in the Andaman Islands in June 1944. It subsequently participated in Operation Crimson, the attack on Japanese shipping and installations at Sabang, Sumatra, on 25 July.

In August 1944, 1837 Naval Air Squadron transferred to HMS Illustrious's sister ship HMS Victorious, where it became part of the 47th Naval Fighter Wing. This brought the first incarnation of the 6th Naval Fighter Wing to an end.

=== Re-formation and HMS Formidable ===
The 6th Naval Fighter Wing was re-formed in Britain in August 1944 around 1841 and 1842 Naval Air Squadrons, both equipped with the Vought Corsair and assigned to HMS Formidable. The two squadrons embarked in HMS Formidable on 7 August, and on 14 August they were formally designated the 6th Naval Fighter Wing. Lieutenant Commander(A) R.L. Bigg-Wither, commanding officer of 1841 Naval Air Squadron, became wing leader.

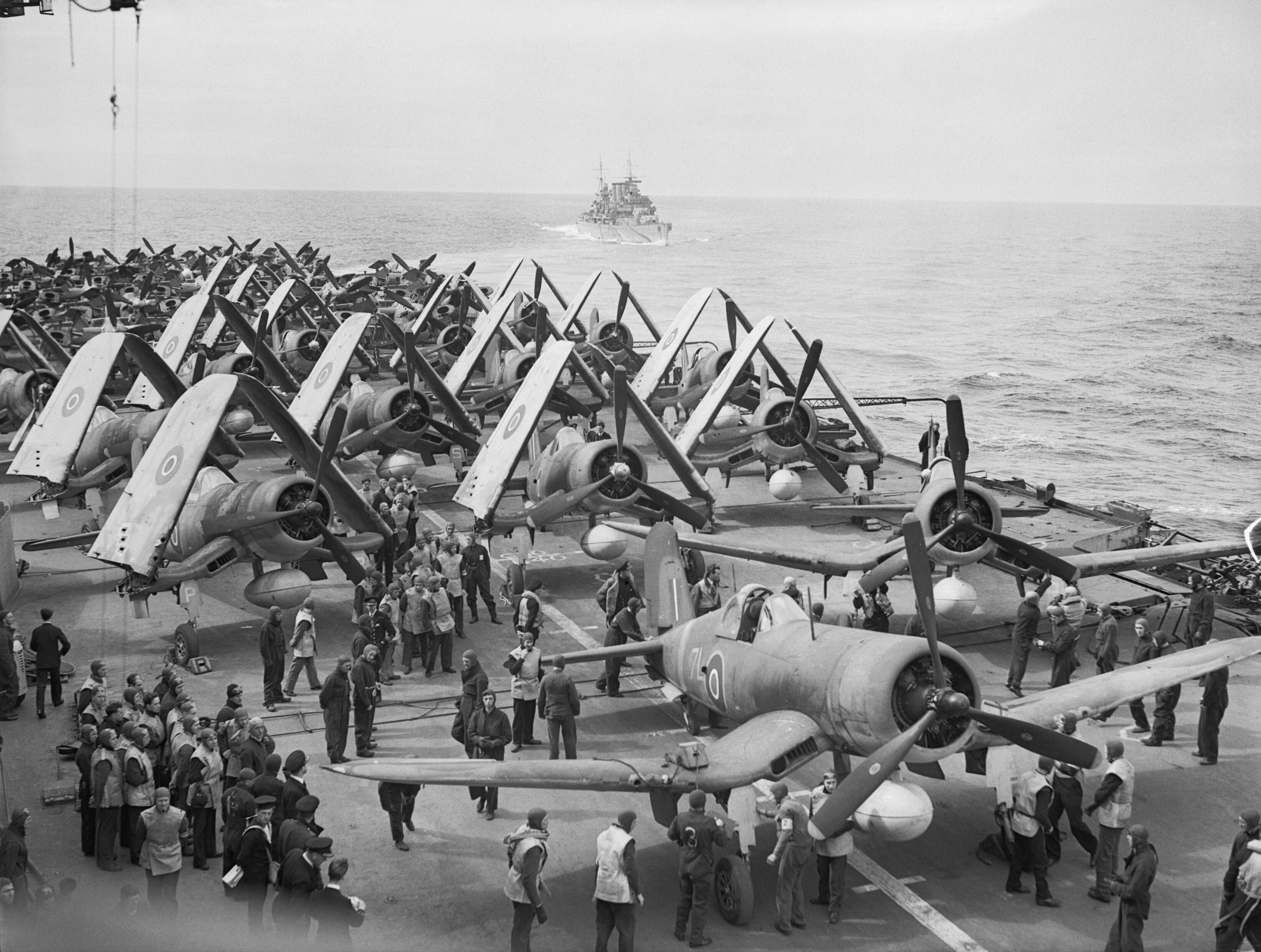
Vought Corsair fighters on the flight deck of HMS Formidable

The wing's first operation in its second incarnation was against the German battleship Tirpitz in northern Norway. HMS Formidable sailed with the Home Fleet for Operation Goodwood, a series of attacks intended to destroy or disable the Tirpitz and reduce the threat she posed to the Arctic convoys. The two squadrons of the 6th Wing operated Vought Corsairs from HMS Formidable during the operation.

On 22 August, aircraft from the carrier force attacked the Tirpitz at her anchorage in Kåfjord. Further attacks followed on 24 and 29 August. During the attacks, Vought Corsairs from 1841 and 1842 Naval Air Squadrons carried out fighter and ground-attack missions against German positions and shipping around the fjord. The operation failed to inflict serious damage on the Tirpitz, but the 6th Wing sustained aircraft and personnel losses.

The 6th Wing was subsequently retained as part of HMS Formidable's air group. Following a refit and passage to the Far East, the carrier joined the British Pacific Fleet.

=== British Pacific Fleet ===
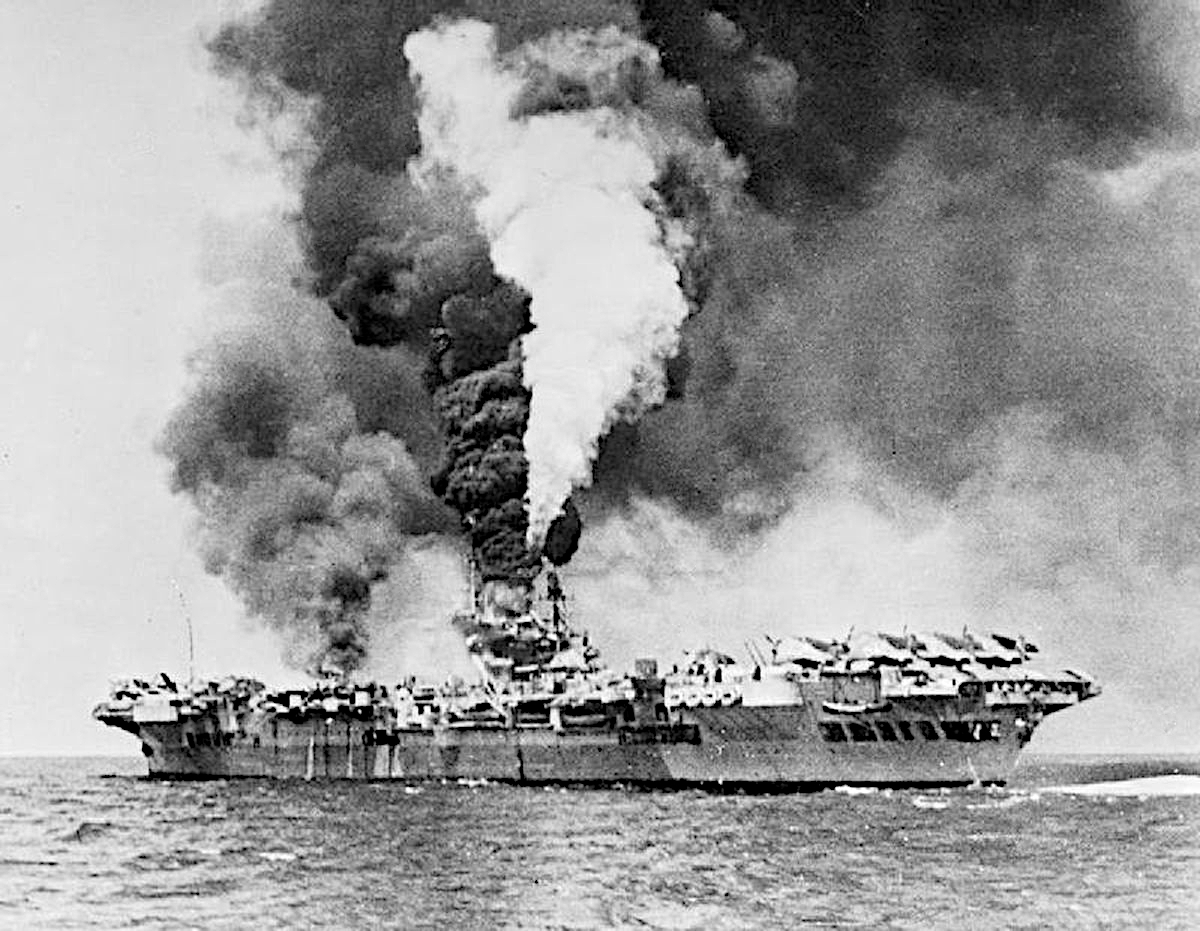
HMS Formidable on fire after being struck by a Kamikaze off Sakishima Gunto

HMS Formidable joined the British Pacific Fleet in 1945, with the 6th Naval Fighter Wing forming the carrier's principal fighter component. The wing's Vought Corsairs took part in Operation Iceberg, the British Pacific Fleet's operations in support of the Battle of Okinawa, including attacks against Japanese airfields and installations in the Sakishima Islands.

The wing continued operations after HMS Formidable reached Australia. In April and May 1945, its Vought Corsairs conducted repeated strikes against Japanese positions in the Sakishima Gunto. HMS Formidable was damaged by kamikaze attacks on 4 and 9 May but remained operational.

Following repairs and replenishment in Australia, HMS Formidable returned to the operational area in June. By this stage the Admiralty had begun reorganising Fleet Air Arm squadrons into carrier air groups based on the United States Navy's system, with squadrons permanently assigned to individual carriers being grouped together under a single carrier air group.

=== Disbandment ===
The 6th Naval Fighter Wing was disbanded on 28 June 1945 as part of the Admiralty's reorganisation of Fleet Air Arm carrier aviation. The squadrons of HMS Formidable were incorporated into the 2nd Carrier Air Group, which comprised 1841 and 1842 Naval Air Squadrons together with 848 Naval Air Squadron.

The change ended the existence of the 6th Naval Fighter Wing as an independent formation. Its former squadrons continued operations with the 2nd Carrier Air Group during the final weeks of the war, including strikes against targets in Japan.

== Squadrons ==
6th Naval Fighter Wing consisted of a small number of Fleet Air Arm squadrons:

- 1837 Naval Air Squadron, February 1944 - August 1944
- 1841 Naval Air Squadron, August 1944 - June 1945
- 1842 Naval Air Squadron, August 1944 - June 1945

== Naval air stations and carrier deployments ==
The 6th Naval Fighter Wing operated from Royal Navy naval air stations in the United Kingdom, Ceylon, Gibraltar and Egypt, as well as from several Royal Navy aircraft carriers and escort carriers. The components of the wing were occasionally deployed independently of one another, particularly during the refit of HMS Formidable in late 1944.

- Royal Naval Air Station Burscough (HMS Ringtail), Lancashire.
  - 1837 Naval Air Squadron (6th Wing formed, 28 February 1944).
- HMS Atheling.
  - 1837 Naval Air Squadron (28 February – 13 April 1944), en route to Ceylon.
- RN Air Section Minneriya, Ceylon.
  - 1837 Naval Air Squadron (13 April – 5 June 1944).
- HMS Unicorn.
  - 1837 Naval Air Squadron (5–7 June 1944, deck-landing training).
- HMS Illustrious.
  - 1837 Naval Air Squadron (19–23 June 1944, Operation Pedal).
- RN Air Section Minneriya, Ceylon.
  - 1837 Naval Air Squadron (26 June – 8 July 1944).
- HMS Illustrious.
  - 1837 Naval Air Squadron (8–27 July 1944, Operation Crimson).
- Royal Naval Air Station Colombo Racecourse (HMS Berhunda), Ceylon.
  - 1837 Naval Air Squadron (23–26 June and 27 July – 14 August 1944).
- HMS Victorious.
  - 1837 Naval Air Squadron (14 August – 9 September 1944); the squadron joined the 47th Naval Fighter Wing and the 6th Wing's first incarnation ended.

The 6th Naval Fighter Wing was re-formed in Britain in August 1944 with 1841 Naval Air Squadron and 1842 Naval Air Squadron, both equipped with Vought F4U Corsairs. The two squadrons operated together from HMS Formidable from 7 August, and were formally designated the 6th Naval Fighter Wing on 14 August.

- Royal Naval Air Station Eglinton (HMS Gannet), County Londonderry.
  - 1841 Naval Air Squadron (20 July – 7 August 1944).
  - 1842 Naval Air Squadron (21 July – 7 August 1944).
- HMS Formidable.
  - 1841 and 1842 Naval Air Squadrons (7 August – 2 September 1944); the two squadrons were formally designated the 6th Naval Fighter Wing on 14 August.
- Royal Naval Air Station Hatston (HMS Sparrowhawk), Mainland, Orkney.
  - 1841 Naval Air Squadron (detachment, 14–18 August 1944).
  - 1842 Naval Air Squadron (14–18 August 1944).
- Royal Naval Air Station Skeabrae, Mainland, Orkney.
  - 1841 Naval Air Squadron (detachment of four aircraft, 14–18 August 1944).
- Royal Naval Air Station Donibristle (HMS Merlin), Fife.
  - 1841 and 1842 Naval Air Squadrons (2–16 September 1944), while Formidable entered dock for refit.
- HMS Formidable.
  - 1841 and 1842 Naval Air Squadrons (16 September – 21 September 1944).
- RN Air Section Gibraltar, Gibraltar.
  - 1841 Naval Air Squadron (from 26 September 1944; the wing was disembarked from Formidable during the carrier's refit).
  - 1842 Naval Air Squadron (21 September – 18 October 1944, detachment; 19 October 1944 – 14 January 1945).
- Royal Naval Air Station Dekheila (HMS Grebe), Alexandria, Egypt.
  - 1841 Naval Air Squadron (15 November 1944 – 27 January 1945).
  - 1842 Naval Air Squadron (15 November 1944 – 27 January 1945).
- HMS Formidable.
  - 1841 Naval Air Squadron (14 January – 8 February 1945).
  - 1842 Naval Air Squadron (14 January – 8 February 1945).
- Royal Naval Air Station Puttalam (HMS Rajaliya), Ceylon.
  - 1841 and 1842 Naval Air Squadrons (8–22 February 1945); the wing's Corsairs were re-equipped with Corsair Mk IV aircraft.
- HMS Formidable.
  - 1841 and 1842 Naval Air Squadrons (22 February – 1 June 1945), including operations with the British Pacific Fleet during Operation Iceberg.
- Royal Naval Air Station Jervis Bay (HMS Nabswick), New South Wales.
  - 1841 and 1842 Naval Air Squadrons (detachment, 22–24 March 1945; 1–22 June 1945).
- HMS Formidable.
  - 1841 and 1842 Naval Air Squadrons (22–28 June 1945). The 6th Naval Fighter Wing was disbanded on 28 June as the Fleet Air Arm adopted the Carrier Air Group system; HMS Formidable's squadrons became part of the 2nd Carrier Air Group.

== Aircraft ==
Naval Air Squadrons assigned to 6 Wing flew different variants of only one aircraft type:

- Vought Corsair Mk II fighter-bomber (1944)
- Vought Corsair Mk III fighter-bomber (1944)
- Vought Corsair Mk IV fighter aircraft (1944 - 1945)

== Wing leaders ==
The wing's recorded commanding officer chronology was:

- Commander H.P. Sears, RN, from 28 February 1944
- Commander T.G C. Jameson, RN, from 7 April 1944
- Lieutenant Commander(A) T.W. Harrington, RN, from 9 September 1944
- unidentified, from April 1945

Note: Abbreviation (A) signifies Air Branch of the RN or RNVR.

== See also ==
- Fleet Air Arm
- List of aircraft wings of the Royal Navy
- 1837 Naval Air Squadron
- 1841 Naval Air Squadron
- 1842 Naval Air Squadron
- 47th Naval Fighter Wing
- 2nd Carrier Air Group
- HMS Formidable
- British Pacific Fleet
