= HMS Charger =

Six ships of the Royal Navy have been named HMS Charger.

- HMS Charger (1801) was a gun-brig
- HMS Charger (1835) was a hulk, formerly HMS Courier and HMS Hermes
- HMS Charger (1856) was an Albacore-class gunboat
- HMS Charger (1894) was a Charger-class destroyer that served in the Royal Navy until 1912.
- HMS Charger (D27) was an escort aircraft carrier that served in World War II. Built for the US Navy, she briefly served in the Royal Navy as HMS Charger before returning to US service as USS Charger (CVE-30).
- HMS Charger (P292) is an Archer-class patrol and training vessel.
