= Tommy Walker (events director) =

American festival director (1922–1986)

Thomas Luttgen Walker (November 8, 1922 – October 20, 1986) was an American producer of live entertainment events. He was director of entertainment at Disneyland during its first twelve years of operation, and later produced events at celebrations including three Olympic Games and the centennial of the Statue of Liberty. He was the composer of the six-note "Charge!" fanfare.

== Early life ==
Walker was born in Milwaukee, Wisconsin, on November 8, 1922. His father, Vesey Walker, was a band director. Tommy performed in one of his father's bands at age 11.

== Education and military service ==
Walker attended University of Southern California (USC). His college career was interrupted by World War II; he returned to USC as a junior after serving in the military.

Walker was a drum major in the USC Trojan Marching Band. He would remove his band uniform jacket and take the field to kick conversions. Walker set a Pacific Coast Conference record in 1947 for number of conversions in a season by making 19 of 29 attempts. His nickname was "Tommy the Toe".

While at USC, Walker wrote the fanfare Charge, which was quickly adopted by Trojan fans. He graduated from USC in 1948.

== Career ==
After graduation, Walker turned down a tryout with the Washington Redkins and became assistant band director at USC, later becoming director.

Walker joined the Walt Disney Company in 1954 as director of entertainment and customer relations. He created the opening ceremony for Disneyland. In 1966, he formed Tommy Walker Productions. Walker produced the opening and closing ceremonies for three Olympics, contributed to five World's Fairs and two presidential inaugurations, directed three Super Bowl halftimes (including the first), and directed fireworks for the Statue of Liberty centennial in 1986. A few months before his death, Walker directed the stadium concert finale for the 350th anniversary of Harvard University.

== Personal life and death ==
Walker and his wife, Lucille, lived in Irvine, California, and had three daughters. He died during open-heart surgery in 1986.
