= Robert Hampton Gray =

Recipient of the Victoria Cross

Robert Hampton Gray VC DSC
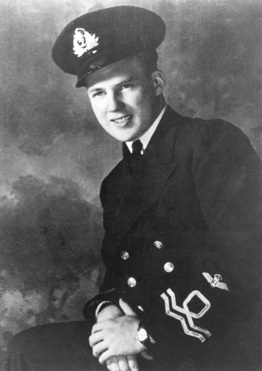
- Born: November 2, 1917; Trail, British Columbia, Canada
- Died: August 9, 1945 (aged 27); Onagawa, Honshū, Japanese Empire
- Military career
- Allegiance: Canada
- Branch: Royal Canadian Naval Volunteer Reserve
- Service years: 1940–45 †
- Rank: Lieutenant
- Nickname: Hammy
- Units: 1841 Squadron, HMS Formidable
- Conflicts: Second World War: North African Campaign; Atlantic War; Operation Goodwood; Pacific War; Volcano and Ryukyu Islands campaign; Battle of Okinawa; Air raids on Japan †
- Awards: Victoria Cross; Distinguished Service Cross; Mentioned in Despatches (2)

Robert Hampton "Hammy" Gray, VC, DSC (November 2, 1917 – August 9, 1945) was a Canadian naval officer, pilot, and recipient of the Victoria Cross during World War II. He and Eugene Esmonde are the only personnel of the Royal Navy's Fleet Air Arm to be decorated the VC in the war. Gray is the last Canadian to be awarded the Victoria Cross.

== Early life ==
Gray was born in Trail, British Columbia, Canada, but resided from an early age in Nelson, where his father was a jeweller.

He completed one year at the University of Alberta before transferring to the Bachelor of Arts program at The University of British Columbia where he was a member of the Phi Delta Theta fraternity.

Before completing university, he enlisted in the Royal Canadian Naval Volunteer Reserve (RCNVR) at HMCS Tecumseh in Calgary, Alberta on July 18, 1940. Originally sent to England for training in September Gray decided to join the Fleet Air Arm. Gray began his training at HMS St Vincent in January 1941 then 24th Elementary Flying Training School in Luton by March. Gray was sent back to Canada to train at RCAF Station Kingston in June. Once completing his training in September, Gray was given the rank of sub-lieutenant and by November was sent back to England to train on the Hawker Hurricane at HMS Heron. While at HMS Heron Gray had the chance to meet his brother Jack, who played the role of an RCAF air gunner in the film Target for Tonight, before being killed in a air accident not long after.

Gray initially joined 757 Naval Air Squadron at Winchester, England at the end of February 1942 where he conducted further training.

== War service ==
=== Africa and Norway ===
Gray was assigned to the African theatre in May 1942, flying Hawker Hurricanes for shore-based squadrons, nos. 795, 803, and 877, where he spent two years at Nairobi. In December Gray served for a brief time aboard the aircraft carrier HMS Illustrious and on December 31 was promoted to lieutenant.

In February 1944 Gray was transferred back to England where trained to fly the Vought F4U Corsair fighter with 748 Naval Air Squadron at HMS Heron and on August 14 he joined 1841 NAS, based on HMS Formidable. From August 24–29, Gray took part in the unsuccessful Operation Goodwood raids against the German battleship Tirpitz, in Norway. On August 29, Gray was Mentioned in Dispatches for his participation in an attack on three German destroyers, during which his plane's rudder was shot off. On January 16, 1945, he received a second Mentioned in Dispatches, "For undaunted courage, skill and determination in carrying out daring attacks on the German battleship Tirpitz."

=== Japan ===
On April 4, 1945, Formidable joined the British Pacific Fleet which was involved in the invasion of Okinawa. On April 16, Gray led a flight of Corsairs during the attacks against Ishigaki and Miyako airfields on Okinawa. Gray conducted combat air patrols for the remainder of April and into May. In the aftermath of the kamikaze strikes on Formidable, the ship returned to Sydney, Australia, on May 22 where Gray helped train replacements from May to July before returning to combat on July 17. On July 18, Gray led a strafing mission against airfields in the Tokyo area and another flight to the inland sea on July 24, which damaged one merchant ship, and damaged two seaplane bases and one airbase. Gray earned a Distinguished Service Cross for aiding in sinking a Japanese destroyer in the area of Tokyo on July 28. The award was not announced until August 21, 1945, when the notice appeared in the London Gazette with the citation, "For determination and address in air attacks on targets in Japan".

==== VC action ====
On August 9, 1945, Gray's original mission was to attack Matsushima airfield, however when it was realized the airfield was out of commission Gray was ordered to attack targets of opportunity. Having spotted Japanese shipping at Onagawa Bay, Miyagi Prefecture, Japan, early in the flight, Gray led the strike force towards the bay. A few hours after the atomic bombing of Nagasaki, Lieutenant Gray (flying Vought F4U Corsair KD658, with 151 as his insignia and an X on the aircraft's tail) led an attack on a group of Japanese naval vessels. Gray scored a direct hit upon the Etorofu-class escort ship Amakusa with a 500-lb bomb which passed through the engine room and detonated a magazine below the gun turret. The resultant explosion blew out the ship's side and caused it to sink rapidly with the loss of 71 crewmen. Gray's plane was damaged by anti-aircraft fire and crashed into the bay. He did not survive.

The citation for his VC, gazetted on November 13, 1945, described as being:

for great valour in leading an attack on a Japanese destroyer in Onagawa Wan, on 9 August 1945. In the face of fire from shore batteries and a heavy concentration of fire from some five warships Lieutenant Gray pressed home his attack, flying very low in order to ensure success, and, although he was hit and his aircraft was in flames, he obtained at least one direct hit, sinking the destroyer. Lieutenant Gray has consistently shown a brilliant fighting spirit and most inspiring leadership.

Gray was one of the last Canadians to die during World War II, and was the last Canadian to be awarded the Victoria Cross. His VC is owned by the Gray family.

== Awards and decorations ==
Gray's personal awards and decorations include the following:

Ribbon	Description	Notes
	Victoria Cross	Citation for Victoria Cross (VC)
	Distinguished Service Cross (DSC)	Citation for Distinguished Service Cross (DSC)
	1939–1945 Star	WWII 1939–1945
	Atlantic Star	WWII 1939–1945
	Africa Star	WWII 1939–1945
	Pacific Star	WWII 1939–1945
	Defence Medal (United Kingdom)	WWII 1939–1945
	Canadian Volunteer Service Medal	WWII 1939–1945 with Overseas Service bar
	War Medal 1939–1945 with Mentioned in dispatches	WWII 1939-1945

== Legacy ==
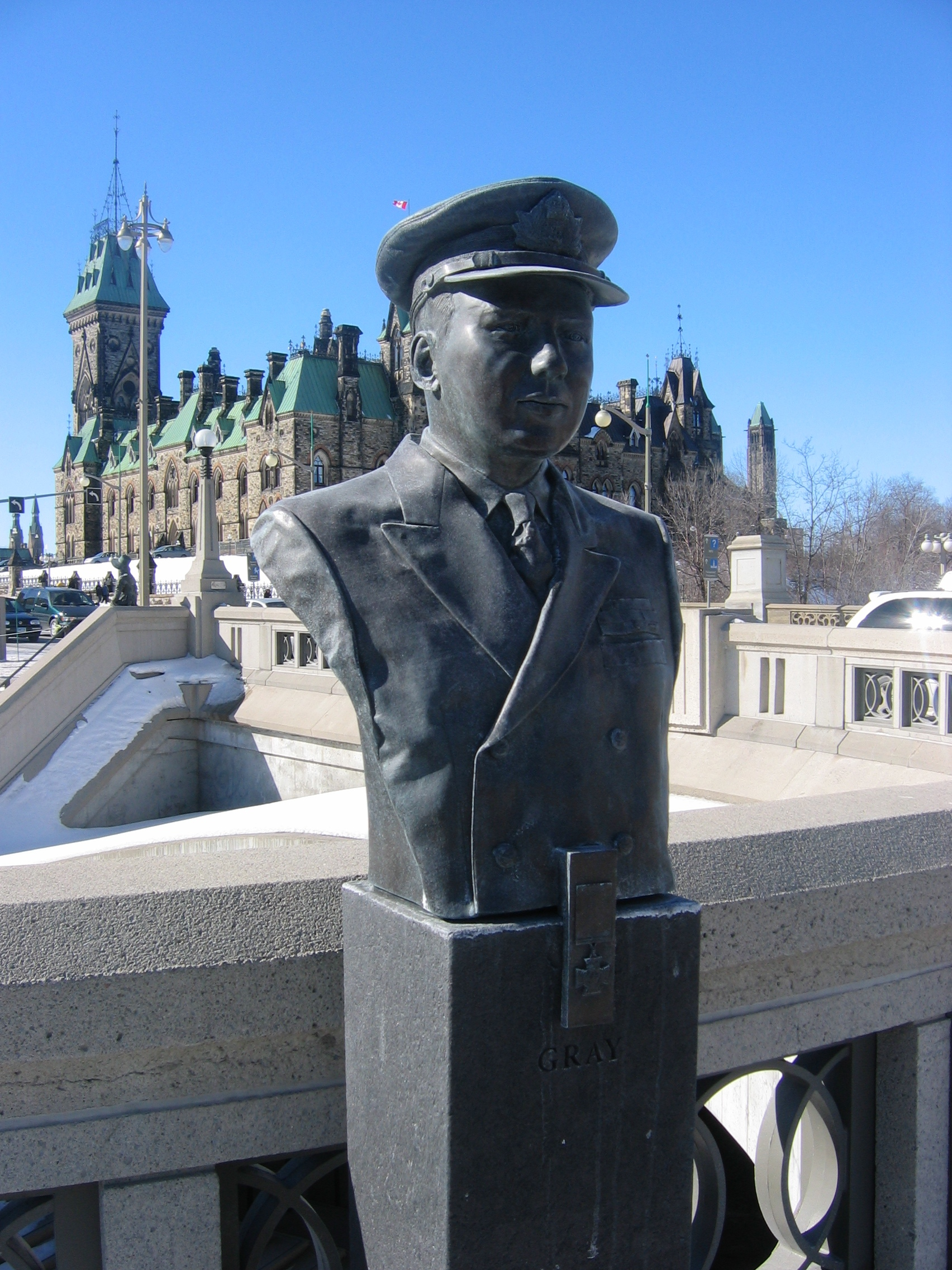
Hampton Gray bust at Valiants Memorial, Ottawa

As Gray's remains were never found, he was listed as missing in action and presumed dead. He is commemorated, with other Canadians who died or were buried at sea during the First and Second World Wars, at the Halifax Memorial in Point Pleasant Park, Halifax, Nova Scotia. His name is listed on the family tombstone in Nelson Memorial Park.

The War Memorial Gym at University of British Columbia, Royal Canadian Legion hall in Nelson, numerous other sites in Nelson, and the wardroom of HMCS Tecumseh (his RCNVR home unit) also bear plaques in his honour.

Gray is one of fourteen figures commemorated at the Valiants Memorial in Ottawa.

A memorial for Gray was erected at Onagawa Bay in 1989 in Sakiyama Park. This is the only memorial dedicated to a foreign soldier on Japanese soil. Following the devastation of the March 11, 2011 earthquake (during which the granite monument itself was knocked over), the monument (with new plaque) was moved from its original location in Sakiyama Park to one beside the hospital (Onagawacho Community Medicine Center) in Onagawa Town. A rededication ceremony was held August 24, 2012.

To celebrate the Centennial of the Canadian Navy, during the 2010 air show season, Vintage Wings of Canada flew at events across Canada in a Corsair bearing the markings of the plane Gray was likely flying that fateful day.

His life is recorded in A Formidable Hero: Lt. R.H. Gray, VC, DSC, RCNVR by Stuart E. Soward, published by Trafford Neptune.

=== Grays Peak, British Columbia ===
On March 12, 1946, the Geographic Board of Canada named a mountain in Kokanee Glacier Provincial Park, British Columbia, after Gray and his brother, Flt Sgt John Balfour Gray, RCAF, who was also killed in World War II. Rising to a height of 2,753 m (9,032 ft), Grays Peak is well known in Canada as the mountain pictured on the label of Kokanee Beer.

=== Hampton Gray Memorial Elementary ===
The elementary school at CFB Shearwater is named after Gray.

=== The Gray Building, Nelson BC ===
The Government of Canada building at 514 Vernon Street, Nelson BC, housing the Canada Post office is dedicated in his name, along with a memorial plaque.

=== Kingston Norman Rogers Airport ===
Gray completed his training at No. 31 Service Flying Training School in Kingston, Ontario. There is a Harvard aircraft, same type of trainer he flew at Kingston, mounted on a pedestal with a memorial dedicated to him. Additionally, the road leading to the airport terminal has been named Hampton Gray Gate.

=== Royal Canadian Sea Cadets ===
The Royal Canadian Sea Cadet Corps in Nelson, BC is named 81 Hampton Gray, VC Royal Canadian Sea Cadet Corps.

=== Royal Canadian Air Cadets ===
In 2012, the Royal Canadian Air Cadets created a new squadron in his honour called 789 Lt. R. Hampton Gray VC Squadron which is located in Mississauga, Ontario.

=== Harry DeWolf-class offshore patrol vessel ===
The sixth Harry DeWolf-class offshore patrol vessel for the Royal Canadian Navy is named for Gray, HMCS Robert Hampton Gray (AOPV 435).

=== Brechin, Angus, Scotland ===
The Gray family headstone in Brechin Cemetery was completely restored in 2021 after it had fallen into a state of disrepair. (The main headstone had been removed from its plinth and positioned on the adjacent grass). The work was carried out and funded by locals. On the 76th anniversary of his death and VC action a short service was conducted at the family grave. The headstone carries the inscriptions for Robert and his brother Flight Sergeant John (Jack) Balfour Gray, RCAF. He was killed on February 27, 1942 serving with 144 Squadron RAF. He is buried in Doncaster (Rosehill) Cemetery.

The Brechin West housing development features a street named after Robert Hampton Gray, Hampton Gray Way.
