= Japanese escort ship Amakusa =

Etorofu-class escort ship

History

Empire of Japan
- Name: Amakusa
- Builder: Hitachi Zosen, Sakurajima
- Laid down: 5 April 1943
- Launched: 1943
- Completed: 20 November 1943
- Fate: Sunk 9 August 1945

General characteristics
- Class & type: Etorofu-class escort ship
- Displacement: 870 long tons (884 t)
- Length: 77.7 m (255 ft)
- Beam: 9.1 m (29 ft 10 in)
- Draught: 3.05 m (10 ft)
- Speed: 19.7 knots (22.7 mph; 36.5 km/h)
- Complement: 150
- Armament: 3 × 120 mm (4.7 in)/45 cal DP guns; Up to 15 × Type 96 25 mm (0.98 in) AA guns; 6 × depth charge throwers; Up to 60 × depth charges

The Japanese escort ship Amakusa was one of fourteen Etorofu-class Kaibōkan destroyer escorts built for the Imperial Japanese Navy during World War II.

== Background and description ==
The Etorofu class was an improved version of the preceding Shimushu class with a greater emphasis on anti-submarine warfare. The ships measured 77.72 meters (255 ft 0 in) overall, with a beam of 9.1 meters (29 ft 10 in) and a draft of 3.05 meters (10 ft 0 in). They displaced 880 metric tons (870 long tons) at standard load and 1,040 metric tons (1,020 long tons) at deep load. The ships had two diesel engines, each driving one propeller shaft, which were rated at a total of 4,200 brake horsepower (3,100 kW) for a speed of 19.7 knots (36.5 km/h; 22.7 mph). The ships had a range of 8,000 nautical miles (15,000 km; 9,200 mi) at a speed of 16 knots (30 km/h; 18 mph).

The main armament of the Etorofu class consisted of three Type 3 120-millimeter (4.7 in) guns in single mounts, one superfiring pair aft and one mount forward of the superstructure. They were built with four Type 96 25-millimeter (1.0 in) anti-aircraft guns in two twin-gun mounts, but the total was increased to 15 guns by August 1943. 36 depth charges were stowed aboard initially, but this later increased by August 1943 to 60 depth charges with a Type 97 81-millimeter (3.2 in) trench mortar and six depth charge throwers. They received Type 22 and Type 13 radars and Type 93 sonar in 1943–44.

== Construction and career ==
Amakusa was damaged by a magnetic mine at Chichi-jima on 20 December 1944. Sailed to Yokosuka and drydocked 13 January 1945. Repairs finished 22 January.

On 26 February 1945 damaged by US Navy aircraft from Task Force 58 east of Izu Shima, 26 crewmen killed. Repaired at Yokosuka with repairs finished on 16 March 1945.

On 9 August 1945, while lying in harbor at the Onagawa Bay, Miyagi Prefecture, Japan, the ship came under attack by a Corsair piloted by Royal Canadian Navy Lieutenant Robert Hampton Gray. Gray scored a direct hit with a 500-lb bomb which passed through the engine room and detonated a magazine below the after gun turret. The resultant explosion blew out the ship's side and caused it to sink rapidly with the loss of 71 crewmen. In return, Gray's aircraft was damaged by anti-aircraft fire and crashed into the bay; he was unable to bail out and was listed as missing. Gray posthumously earned the Victoria Cross.

Memorials dedicated to the crew of the Amakusa and Lt. Gray were erected in Sakiyama Scenic Park, at a spot overlooking Onagawa Bay.
