= Insert Subscriber Data =

Insert Subscriber Data is a Subscriber Data Handling procedure in GSM services. This procedure is used to manage the subscription data of subscriber in MME and SGSN over S6a/S6d interface. IDR is invoked by Home Subscriber Server for subscription data handling. IDR is MAP subscriber management service utilized in GSM/UMTS networks, standardized by 3GPP, and defined in the MAP specification, TS 29.002. This service is used to provide specific subscriber data in the following environments: by an HLR to update a VLR, by an HLR to update a SGSN, and by an HSS to update a MME via IWF in an EPS. This service is primarily used by the home subscriber management entity to update the serving subscriber management entity when there is either a change in a subscriber parameter, or upon a location updating of the subscriber.

== Parameters ==
As of specification released December 2008, the following parameters are supported by the Insert Subscriber Data service:

- Invoke Id
- IMSI
- MSISDN
- Category
- Subscriber Status
- Bearer service List
- Teleservice List
- Forwarding information List
- Call barring information List
- CUG information List
- SS-Data List
- eMLPP Subscription Data
- MC-Subscription Data
- Operator Determined Barring General data
- Operator Determined Barring HPLMN data
- Roaming Restriction Due To Unsupported Feature
- Regional Subscription Data
- VLR CAMEL Subscription Info
- Voice Broadcast Data
- Voice Group Call Data
- Network access mode
- GPRS Subscription Data
- EPS Subscription Data
- Roaming Restricted In SGSN/MME Due To Unsupported Feature
- North American Equal Access preferred Carrier Id List
- SGSN CAMEL Subscription Info
- LSA Information
- IST Alert Timer
- SS-Code List
- LMU Identifier
- LCS Information
- CS Allocation/Retention priority
- Super-Charger Supported In HLR
- Subscribed Charging Characteristics
- Access Restriction Data
- ICS Indicator
- CSG Subscription Data
- Regional Subscription Response
- Supported CAMEL Phases
- Offered CAMEL 4 CSIs
- Supported Features
