= Supercharger (disambiguation) =

A supercharger is an air compressor that increases the pressure or density of air supplied to an internal combustion engine.

Other uses of supercharge, supercharger or supercharged include:

== Arts and entertainment ==
- Supercharger (album), by Machine Head, 2001
- Starpath Supercharger, add-on unit for the Atari 2600 video game console
- Skylanders: SuperChargers, a video game
- Supercharge (band), a 1970s British rock band
- Supercharge (song), by Enter Shikari 2017
- Supercharged (The Offspring album), by The Offspring, 2024
- Supercharged (Tavares album), by Tavares, 1980
- Fast & Furious: Supercharged, a former amusement park attraction at Universal Studios Hollywood
- Dinotrux Supercharged, the sixth through eighth seasons of Dinotrux

== Sports ==
- Big Chill Super Chargers, Philippine basketball team
- Northern Superchargers, English cricket team
- San Diego Super Chargers, fight song of an American football team

== Science and technology ==
- Supercharge, a transformation in theoretical physics
- Tesla Supercharger, a network of DC fast-charging stations for electric cars
- Super-Charged network, or Super-Charger network, a telecommunications term

== See also ==
- The dictionary definition of supercharge at Wiktionary
- The dictionary definition of supercharger at Wiktionary
