= Charge (bugle call) =

Bugle call

Charge (Man overboard)

Charge bugle call

Charge (US Navy, 1940)

"Charge" is a bugle call that signals the command to execute a cavalry or infantry charge. It is especially associated with the United States Cavalry as a result of its frequent use in Western films. A simple unmistakable call, it was even recognizable by experienced horses.

== See also ==
- "Charge" (fanfare)
