= Charge (fanfare) =

Short fanfare played at sporting events

"Charge" is a short fanfare frequently played at sporting events.

Charge (MIDI piano)

It was written by Tommy Walker while a junior at the University of Southern California in the fall of 1946. The fanfare consists of six notes followed by rooters shouting, "Charge!" Occasionally, the fanfare is repeated one or more times in the same key or in successively higher keys, or is preceded by a lead-in vamp.

In 1958 the Brooklyn Dodgers moved to Los Angeles and in the spring of 1959 the Dodgers put on sale, at $1.50 apiece (equivalent to $17 in 2025), 20,000 toy trumpets capable of playing the six notes of the "Charge" fanfare. The fanfare was heard in NBC broadcasts of games 3, 4 and 5 of the 1959 World Series between the Dodgers and the Chicago White Sox and played at cars.

It also appeared in the original The Flintstones 1960s television cartoon series (episode dates uncertain), followed by "Charge!" or "Charge it!", shouted by characters (typically Wilma Flintstone and Betty Rubble) on the way to a shopping spree. Scrappy-Doo, a character that appeared in the 1980s incarnations of the Scooby-Doo franchise, also regularly used the fanfare as a lead-in to his catchphrase, "Puppy Power!" The fanfare was incorporated into the jingles used on Scott Shannon's Rockin American Top 30 Countdown which ran from 1984 through 1992. In the first-person shooter video game Overwatch, the character Bastion makes a noise similar to this fanfare when it uses its ultimate ability. The fanfare is also used in FIRST robotics competitions as the sound cue for the matches to begin.

Bobby Kent, former musical director of the San Diego Chargers, has claimed he invented the "Charge" fanfare in 1978 while working for the Chargers. Kent filed suit against ASCAP for negotiating licenses with MLB, NFL, NBA, NHL, NCAA and NASCAR while failing to secure his consent. The Los Angeles Lakers settled with Kent for $3,000. Kent's claim can be disproven by the fact that Frank Leahy, the Chargers' first general manager in 1960, chose the name "Chargers" after the already existing fanfare.

== See also ==
- Charge (bugle call)
