= Royal Canadian Naval Volunteer Reserve =

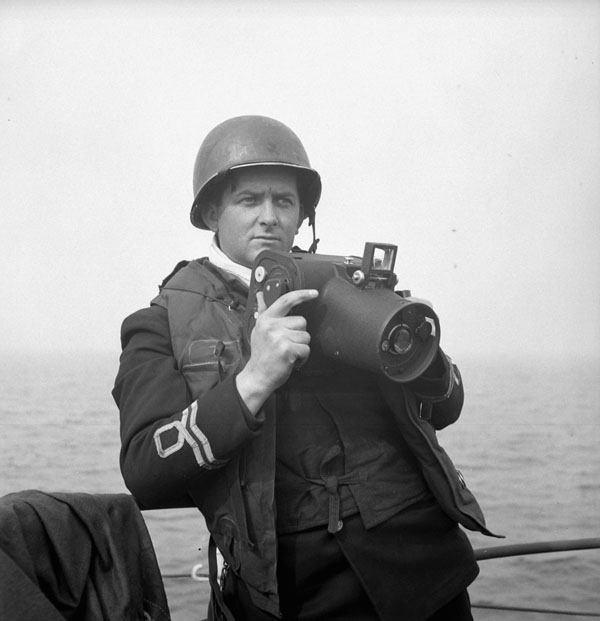
Lieutenant Gilbert A. Milne of the RCNVR, holding a Fairchild K-20 camera

The Royal Canadian Naval Volunteer Reserve (RCNVR) was a naval reserve force of the Royal Canadian Navy from 1923 to 1946. It replaced the Royal Naval Canadian Volunteer Reserve (RNCVR).

== Foundation ==
The RCNVR was created in 1923. The organization was established by Rear-Admiral Walter Hose in a time when the Navy was under drastic budget cuts. Hose saw the establishment of a reserve force as a great way for the fledgling Canadian Navy to build support from coast to coast. Thus he established Naval Reserve Divisions in every major Canadian city.

The initial authorized strength of the RCNVR was 1,000 all ranks. Fifteen Canadian cities were earmarked for a division. Most were to be of “Half-Company” strength, which was 50, all ranks. These cities were Calgary, Charlottetown, Edmonton, Halifax, Hamilton, Ottawa, Prince Rupert, Quebec City, Regina, Saint John, Saskatoon and Vancouver. Three cities were ordered to man to a “Company” strength, which was 100, all ranks. These cities were Toronto, Montreal and Winnipeg. The first commission was given, on March 14, 1923, to Lieutenant Frank Meade, who established a company-sized detachment in Montreal. By the end of that year, twelve units had been formed.

== Role in the Second World War ==
The RCNVR became the backbone of the Canadian Navy, recruiting officers and sailors for the navy. The usefulness of the RCNVR was demonstrated in 1939, at the onset of the Second World War, when the RCNVR was used to recruit and build the navy. By the end of the war, Canada had the third largest navy in the world, with a complement of nearly 100,000. Most of these men and women were members of the RCNVR.

Robert Hampton Gray, a member of the RCNVR from Nelson, British Columbia, was a pilot with the British Pacific Fleet when he sank a Japanese destroyer on August 9, 1945. He was posthumously awarded the Victoria Cross.

After the Second World War, the RCNVR was merged with the RCNR on 1 January 1946 to form the Royal Canadian Navy (Reserve).

| Department title | Years |
|---|---|
| Naval Reserve | 1968–present |
| Royal Canadian Naval Reserve | 1945–1968 |
| Royal Naval Canadian Volunteer Reserve | 1914–1920 |

== Uniforms ==
Officers in the regular navy wore straight stripes on their uniform sleeves while RCNVR officers had wavy stripes, giving rise to the nickname “Wavy Navy”.
