= Charge (youth) =

Youth placed in the care of a un-related or familiar adult

During the European Middle Ages, a charge often meant an underage person placed under the supervision of a nobleman. Charges were the responsibility of the nobleman they were charged to, and they were usually expected to be treated as guests or a member of the household. Charges were at times used more or less openly as hostages, in order to keep their parents in line.

Today, the word is still used to mean anyone that a person is responsible for, such as a parent or chaperone's children, a supervisor's employees, a teacher's students, or a nurse or doctor's patients.

== See also ==
- Ward (law)
- Vassal
