= USS Charger =

United States Navy escort carrier

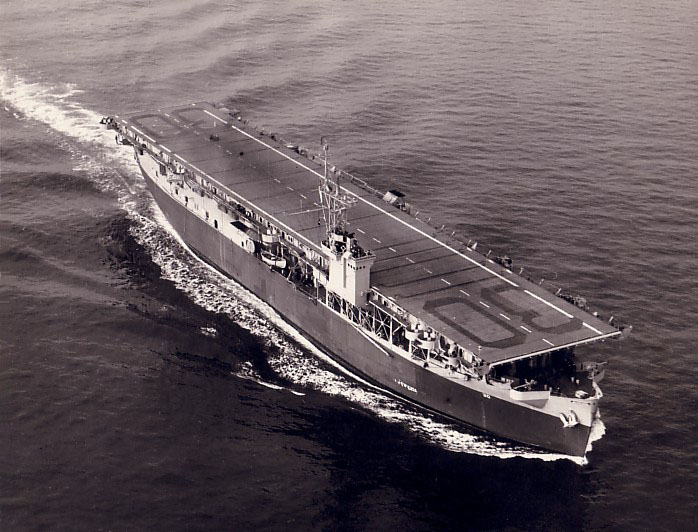
- USS Charger CVE-30

History

United States
- Name: Rio de la Plata (1941); Charger (1941–47); Fairsea (1947–69)
- Namesake: Royal Navy name retained
- Ordered: 29 November 1939
- Builder: Sun Shipbuilding & Drydock Co., Chester, Pennsylvania
- Cost: $2,720,800 (1939 contract)
- Yard number: 188
- Laid down: 19 January 1940
- Launched: 1 March 1941
- Acquired: 1 August 1941 (delivery to Navy for conversion)
- Commissioned: 3 March 1942
- Decommissioned: 15 March 1946
- Reclassified: D27 (R.N. pennant 1941); AVG-30, 24 January 1942; ACV-30, 20 August 1942; CVE-30, 15 July 1943
- Fate: Sold into merchant service, 30 January 1947; Sold for scrap, 1969

General characteristics
- Class & type: Charger-class escort carrier
- Displacement: 15,125 long tons (15,368 t)
- Length: 492 ft (150 m)
- Beam: 69 ft 6 in (21.18 m); 111 ft 2 in (33.88 m) extreme width
- Draft: 26 ft 3 in (8.00 m)
- Speed: 17 knots (31 km/h; 20 mph)
- Complement: 856 officers and enlisted
- Armament: 1 × 5 in (130 mm) gun; 2 × 3"/50 caliber guns; 10 × Oerlikon 20 mm cannon
- Aircraft carried: 30+

USS Charger (CVE-30) was an escort carrier of the United States Navy during World War II converted from a commercial C3-P&C cargo/passenger liner hull built as Rio de la Plata intended for the Moore-McCormack company's American Republics Line serving the east coast of South America. (Note: The others were Rio Hudson, Rio Parana and Rio de Janeiro.) The ship was requisitioned for conversion to an escort carrier type intended for Royal Navy use and initially commissioned as HMS Charger (D27). Days later the transfer was rescinded with the ship returning to U.S. Navy control to become USS Charger which operated throughout the war as a training ship on the Chesapeake Bay with two ferry missions to Bermuda and Guantánamo Bay, Cuba.

After decommissioning in March 1946 the ship was sold in January 1947 to become the Italian Fairsea engaged largely in refugee and immigrant voyages from Europe to Australia. After a disabling engine room fire in January 1969 the ship was sold for scrap in Italy.

== Construction ==
The United States Maritime Commission (MC) accepted Sun Shipbuilding's bid to build the four C3-P&C cargo/passenger liners on 29 November 1939 at a cost of $2,720,800 each. Rio de la Plata was planned as the third of four ships to be built by the Sun Shipbuilding and Drydock Co., Chester, Pennsylvania for the Moore-McCormack company.

The modified C3 type was intended for Moore-McCormack's American Republics Line for serving the east coast of the United States to South America and the first large U.S. passenger ships to be fitted with diesel engines. Two six cylinder Sun Doxford diesels with over 9,000 shaft horsepower drove a single propeller through reduction gears for a design speed of 17.5 kn (20.1 mph; 32.4 km/h). The ships were designed to carry 196 passengers (Note: Karsten-Kunibert Krueger-Kopiske has passenger capacity at 216.) with all passenger spaces air conditioned, another first for passenger ships. The passenger design was not completed due to requisitioning for war service. The passenger-cargo design was to be a 17,500 ton displacement, 9,800 DWT vessel, 492 ft (150.0 m) length overall and 465 ft (141.7 m) length between perpendiculars. Cargo capacity, with conditioned air to avoid moisture, was to be 440,000 cubic feet (12,459.4 m^{3}) (bale measure) with 40,000 cubic feet (1,132.7 m^{3}) of refrigerated space. Passengers were to be quartered in 76 staterooms, 22 single cabins, 34 double cabins and 20 cabins with private verandahs.

The keel for Rio de la Plata, MC hull 61, yard hull 188, was laid 19 January 1940 with launch on 1 March 1941 and delivery on 2 October 1941. The ship was sponsored by Mrs. Felipe A. Espil (Courtney Letts de Espil).

On 20 May 1941, the United States Maritime Commission requisitioned all four unfinished combiliners, for conversion to military use.

== Career ==
=== United States Navy ===
On 1 August 1941 the four ships were delivered to the Navy for conversion before completion as commercial vessels. Conversion for naval duties was by the Newport News Shipbuilding and Drydock Co., Newport News, Virginia. Intended for transfer to the Royal Navy under Lend-Lease, the former Rio de la Plata was commissioned on 2 October 1941 as HMS Charger (D27). However, the transfer was rescinded and the ship returned to United States control on 4 October 1941. The vessel was reclassified AVG-30 on 24 January 1942 and commissioned as USS Charger on 3 March 1942, Captain T. L. Sprague USN in command; and reported to the Atlantic Fleet. (Note: Listed by the United States Navy as the sole ship of the "Charger Type of 1942 (Class)", she actually had several sister ships in HMS Avenger, Biter, and Dasher, all with similar building histories and transferred to the Royal Navy under Lend-Lease.)

Charger's area of operations throughout the war was Chesapeake Bay, and her duty the basic task of training pilots and ships' crews in carrier operations. Men trained on her decks played an important role in the successful contest for the Atlantic with hostile submarines carried out by the escort carrier groups. Reclassified ACV-30 on 20 August 1942, and CVE-30 on 15 July 1943, Charger left Chesapeake Bay for two ferry voyages, one to Bermuda in October 1942, and one to Guantánamo Bay, Cuba, in September 1945. Charger was decommissioned at New York on 15 March 1946.

USS Charger

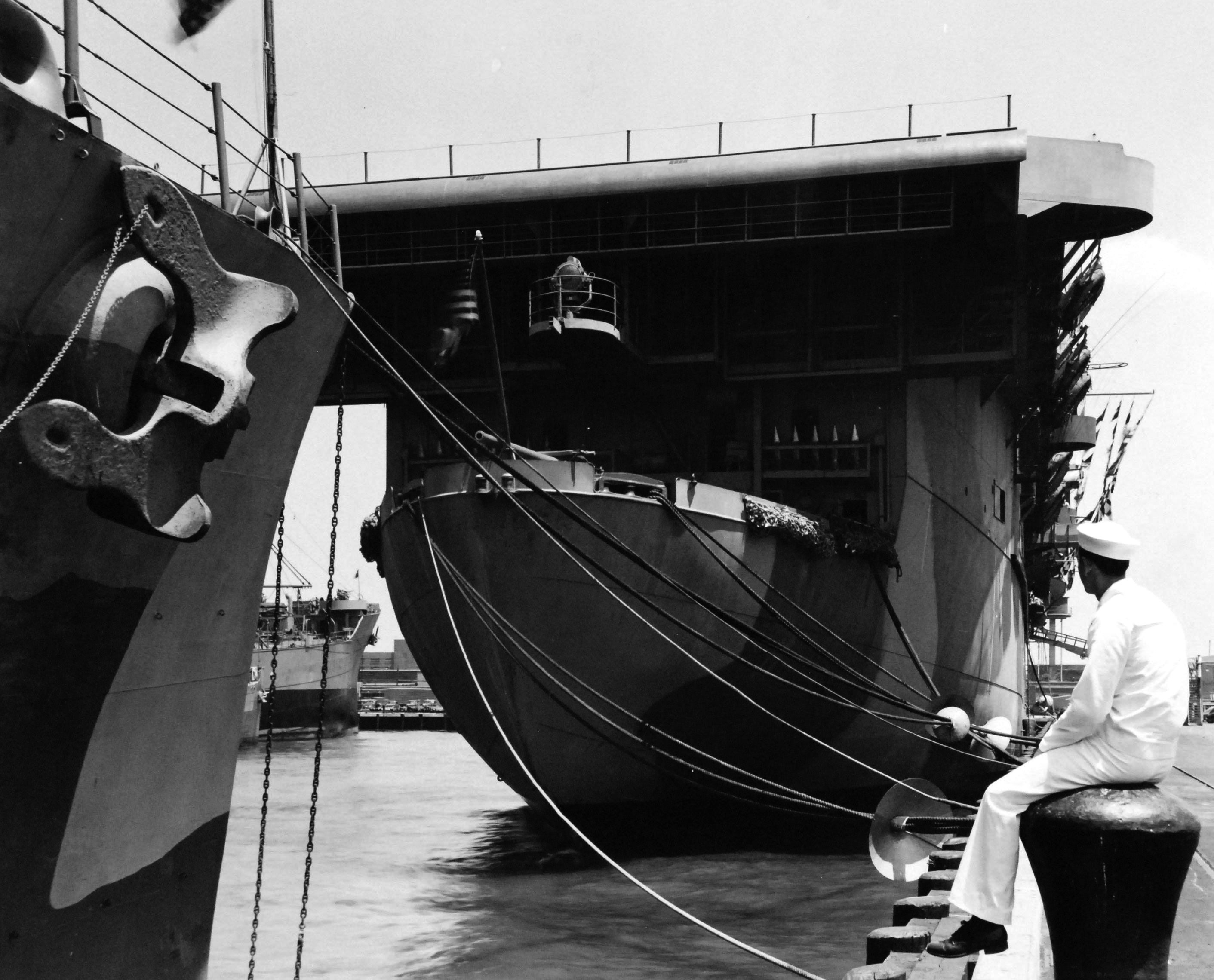
Charger stern view (AVG-30)

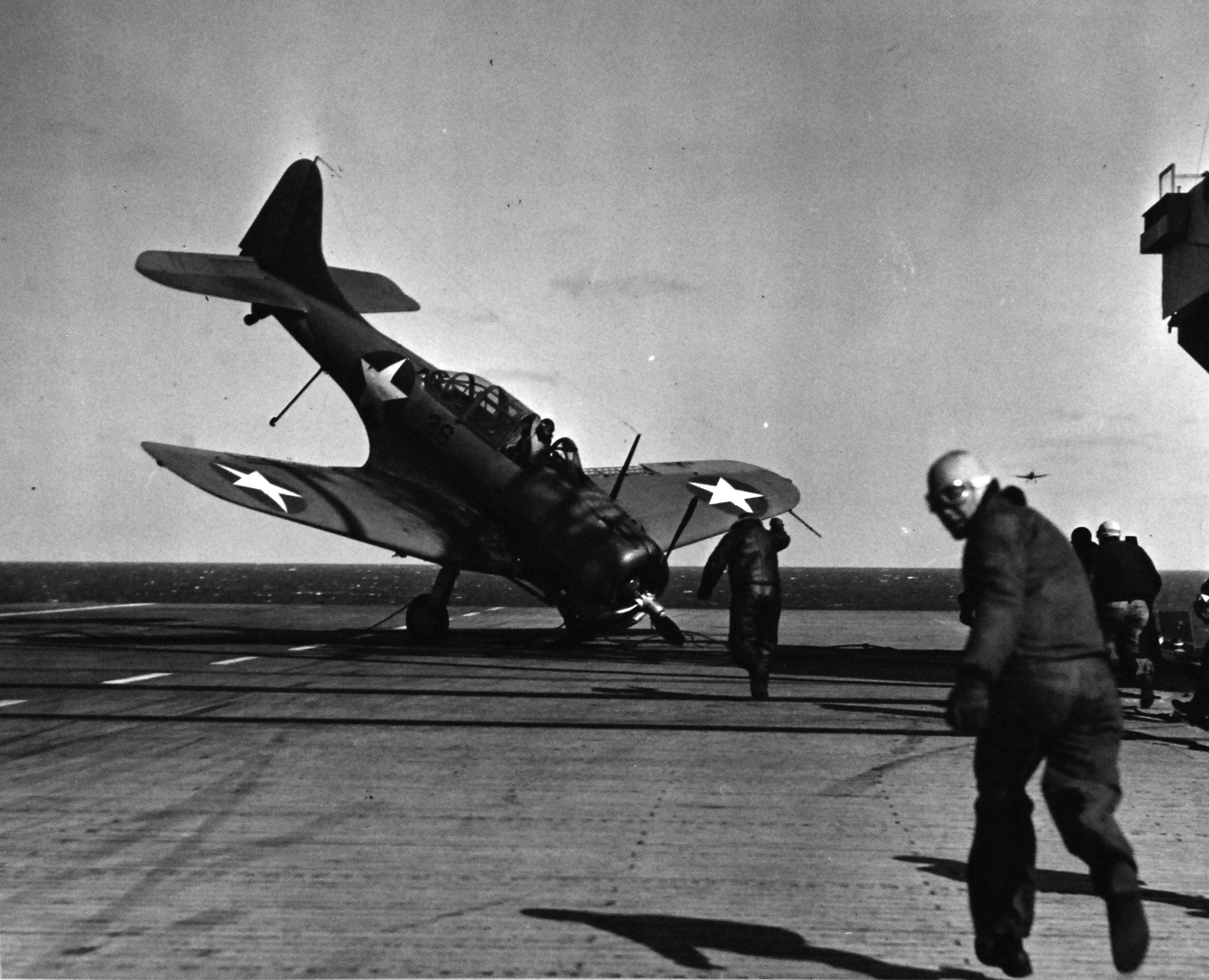
SBD-4 Dauntless crash on Charger (ACV-30)

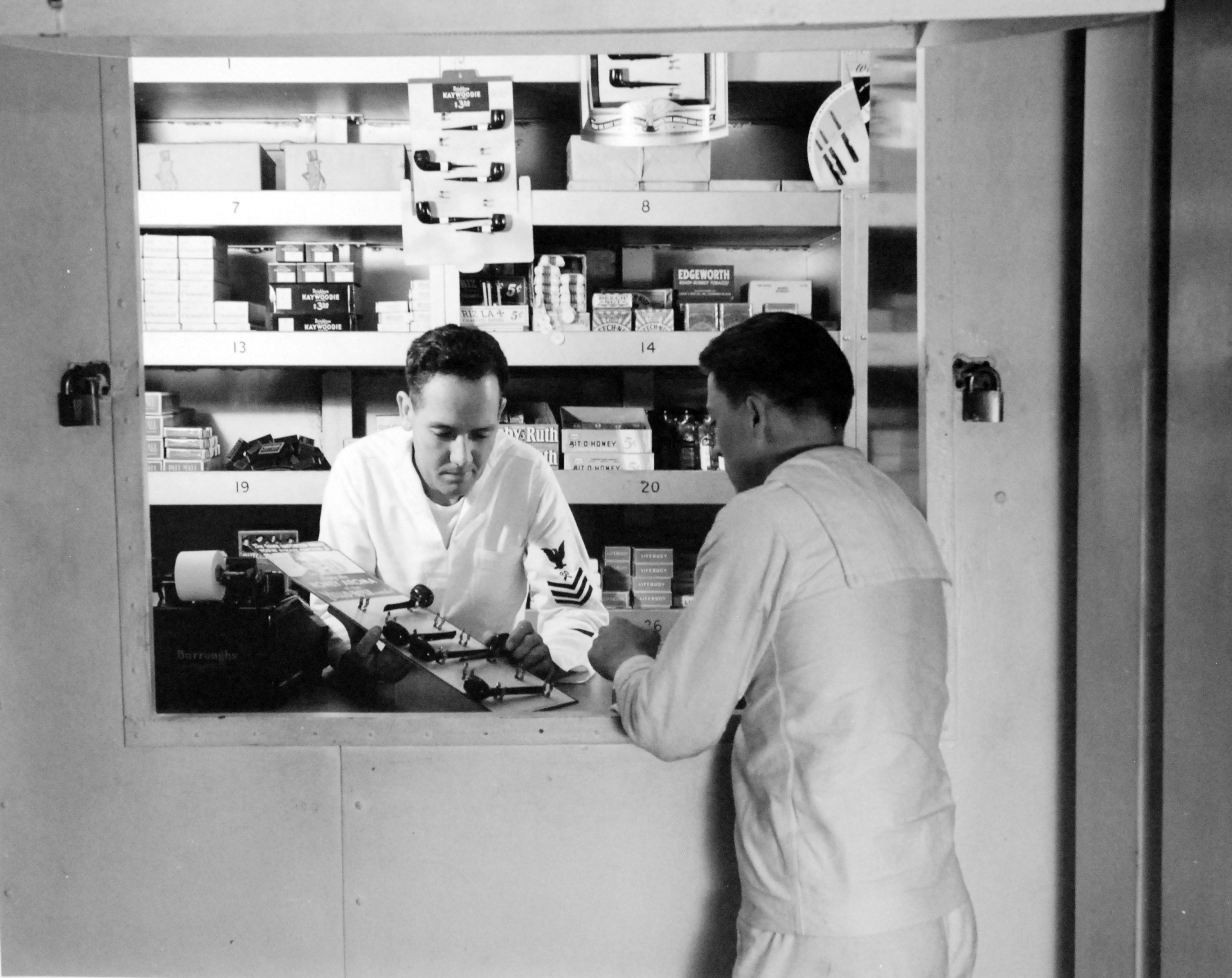
Canteen aboard Charger (ACV-30)

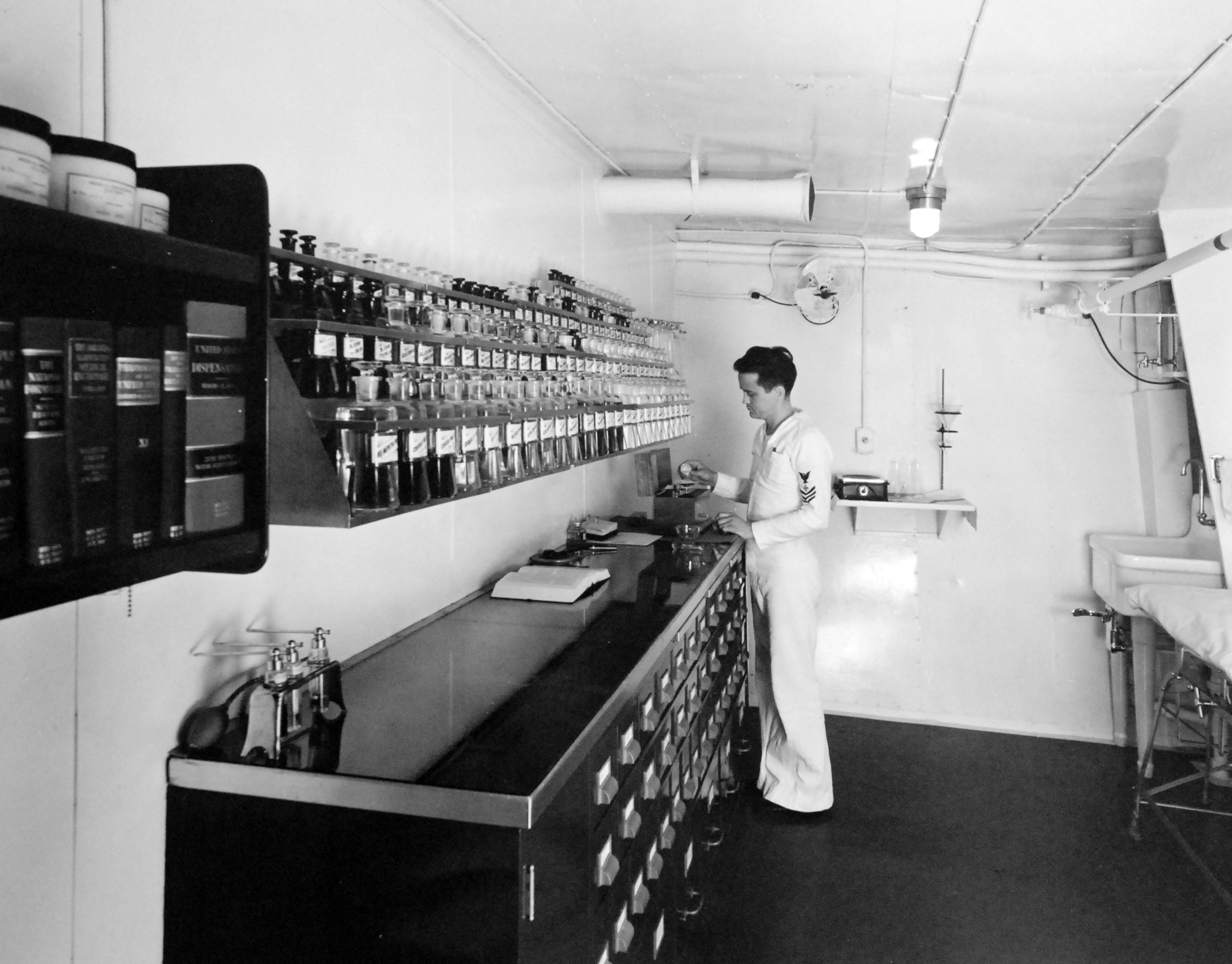
Ship's dispensary on Charger (ACV-30)

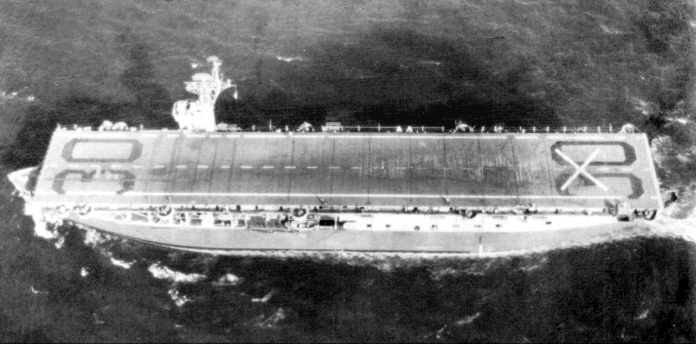
Flight Deck of Charger (CVE-30)

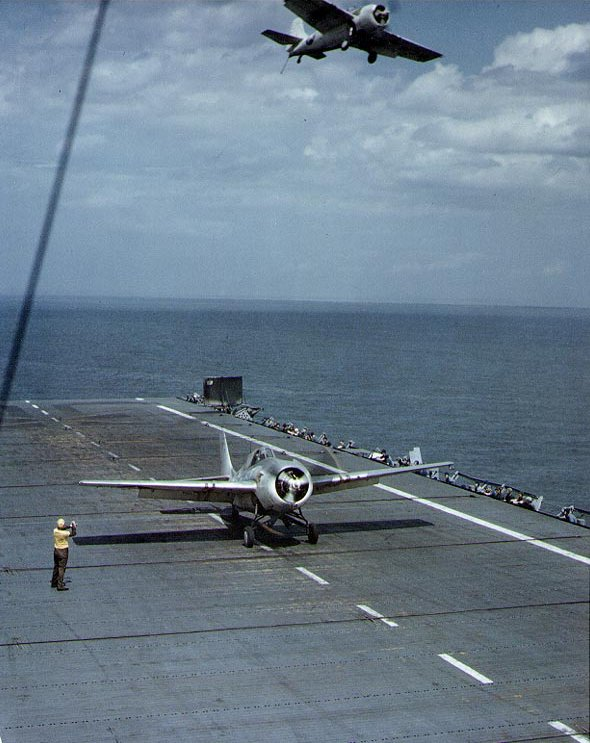
FM-2 "Wildcat" aboard Charger

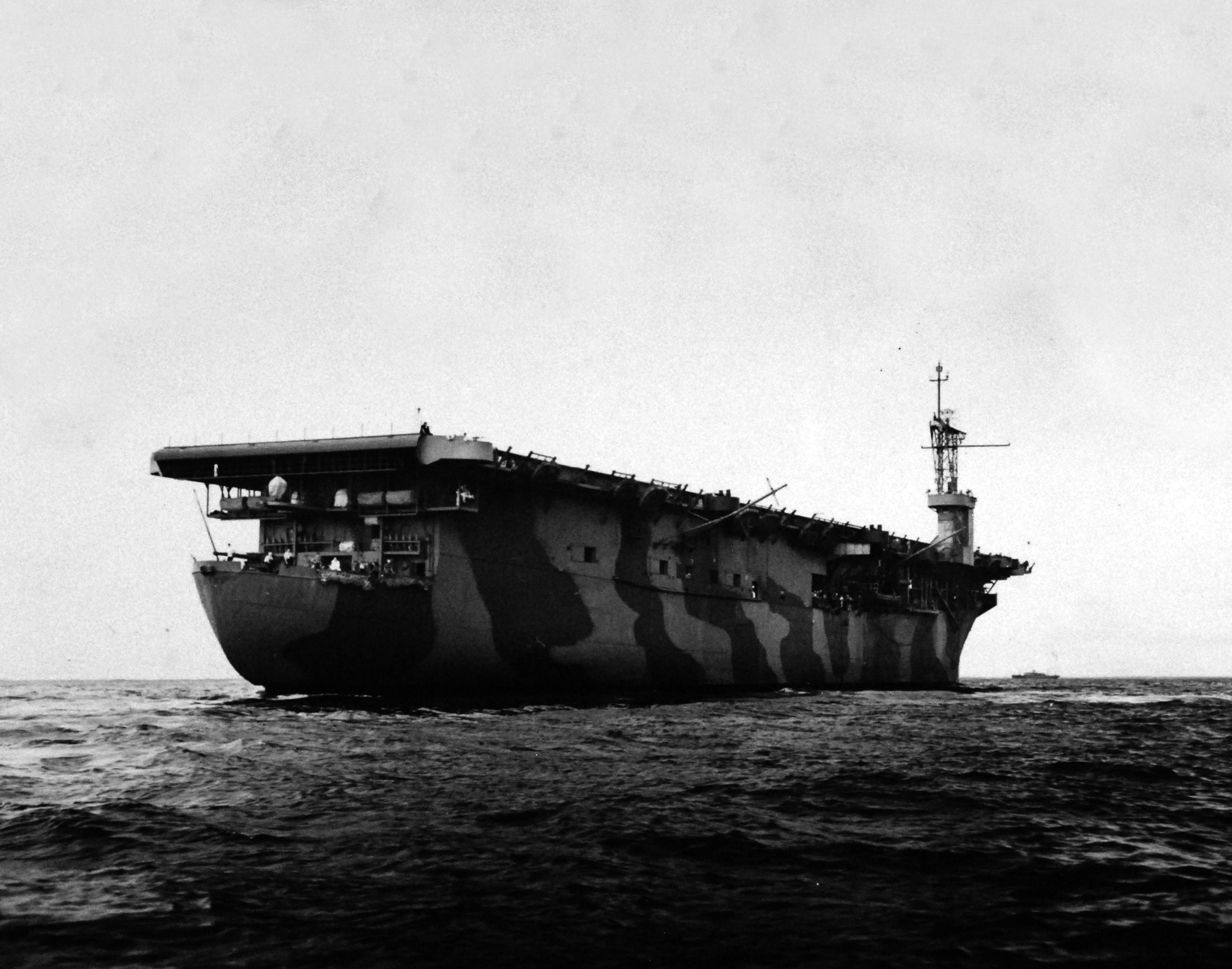
Aft view of Charger (AVG-30) underway

=== Post-war service ===
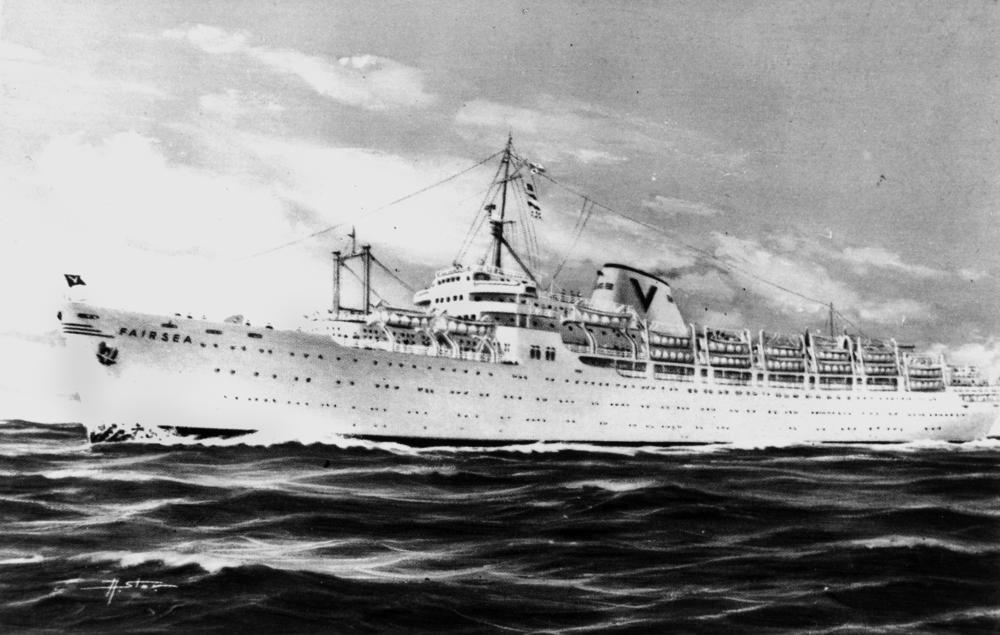
The ship as Fairsea

The ship was sold into merchant service on 30 January 1947 to the Vlasov group. After conversion the vessel became the passenger liner Fairsea, nominally for Vlasov's Italian managed Sitmar Line. Successive accommodation upgrades secured the vessel's long-term employment, mainly as a migrant carrier from Europe to Australia.

Among the immigrants arriving aboard Fairsea in 1958 was the Gibb family with future Bee Gees Barry, Maurice and Robin; and their infant brother, solo singer Andy. Also aboard were Kylie Minogue's parents and Skyhooks guitarist Red Symons.

Fairsea was disabled by an engine-room fire between Tahiti and Panama on 29 January 1969. Primarily due to a lack of spare parts she was sold for scrap in Italy in 1969, the last of the four to cease operation. Her last surviving former sister Biter (later the French Navy's Dixmude), had been returned to the United States and sunk as a target in 1966.

== See also ==
- Fairsky
