= List of aircraft wings of the Royal Navy =

This is a list of aircraft wings of the Royal Navy. The aircraft wings of the Royal Navy were operational groupings of Fleet Air Arm squadrons formed during the Second World War to organise embarked air power aboard fleet, light fleet, and escort carriers. Introduced in 1943, wings were designated either as Naval Fighter Wings or Naval Torpedo‑Bomber‑Reconnaissance (TBR) Wings, reflecting the principal roles of naval aviation at the time. Their numbering system incorporated the word Naval to avoid duplication with Royal Air Force wings, which already used similar numerical sequences.

Wings formed part of a wider Admiralty aviation structure that included the Director of Naval Air Organisation, Director of Naval Air Equipment, and Director of Naval Air Warfare, which oversaw aircraft allocation, operational policy, and training. Although several wings were planned, only a limited number were fully established before the Fleet Air Arm adopted the United States Navy’s Carrier Air Group system in 1945, leading to the disbandment of most wings as their carriers returned to home waters.

The wings listed below represent the first formal attempt to group Fleet Air Arm squadrons into higher‑level operational formations and formed the organisational bridge between early wartime squadron groupings and the post‑war Carrier Air Group structure.

== Background ==
Royal Navy aircraft wings were introduced in 1943 as part of a wider reorganisation of Fleet Air Arm command and control during the Second World War. Each wing grouped several Naval Air Squadrons for embarked operations aboard fleet, light fleet, or escort carriers, and was designated either as a Naval Fighter Wing or a Naval Torpedo‑Bomber‑Reconnaissance (TBR) Wing.

The numbering system incorporated the word Naval to avoid duplication with existing Royal Air Force wings, which already used similar numerical sequences. Wings formed part of a broader Admiralty aviation structure that included the Director of Naval Air Organisation, Director of Naval Air Equipment, and Director of Naval Air Warfare, all responsible for operational policy, aircraft allocation, and training.

Wings were short‑lived. From late 1944 the British Pacific Fleet adopted the United States Navy’s Carrier Air Group system, leading to the disbandment of most wings as their carriers returned to home ports in 1945.

== Structure and roles ==
Naval Air Wings typically consisted of two to four squadrons grouped for embarked operations. Fighter Wings operated Supermarine Seafire or Grumman Helllcat units for fleet air defence, while TBR Wings operated Fairey Barracuda or Grumman Avenger squadrons for torpedo strikes, bombing, and reconnaissance.

Wings were administratively subordinate to the commanding officer of the carrier on which they were embarked, but operational direction was exercised through the Fleet Air Arm and the Admiralty’s naval aviation divisions. Several wings were planned but never formed, including the proposed 31st TBR Wing and a wing intended for Merchant Aircraft Carrier (MAC‑ship) operations.

== Relationship to other Fleet Air Arm formations ==
Aircraft wings represented an intermediate organisational level between individual squadrons and the later Carrier Air Groups. They replaced earlier ad hoc squadron groupings used aboard carriers in the early years of the war. The adoption of the Carrier Air Group model in 1945 aligned British practice with that of the United States Navy and resulted in the dissolution of most wings.

Wings also interacted with shore‑based training and maintenance organisations, including Royal Naval Air Stations and the Department of Naval Air Material, which provided flying training, deck‑landing instruction, aircraft maintenance, and logistical support.

== Unified list of numbered wings ==
The table below covers all the wings that were formed or proposed during World War II.

Aircraft wings of the Royal Navy. Wings were either formed as Fighter wings or Torpedo, Bomber & Reconnaissance (TBR) wings (including the 18th Naval MAC-Ship Wing and the proposed 31st TBR Wing)
Wing		Wing leader(s)	History
2nd Naval TBR Wing	2 Wing	Lieutenant Commander E. M. Britton, RN (24 January 1944)	Formed on 24 January 1944 for HMS Implacable with 828 and 841 Naval Air Squadrons, equipped with Fairey Barracudas. The wing embarked in HMS Implacable in August 1944, with a short detachment ashore. On 28 November 828 Naval Air Squadron absorbed 841 Naval Air Squadron and the wing disbanded. It reformed at RNAS Katukurunda on 10 December as No. 2 Strike Wing, with 820 and 849 Naval Air Squadron equipped with Grumman Avengers, but the two squadrons embarked in different carriers in January 1945, effectively ending the wing.
3rd Naval Fighter Wing	3 Wing	Lieutenant Commander(A) S.J. Hall, RNVR (25 October 1943); Lieutenant Commander(A) R.McD. Hill, RNVR (13 March 1944); Lieutenant Commander N.G. Hallett, DSC, RN (22 May 1944); Lieutenant Commander R.H.P. Carver, DSC, RN (30 September 1944); Lieutenant Commander(A) B.H.C. Nation, RN (16 November 1944); Major P.P. Nelson-Gracie, RM (11 February 1945); Lieutenant Commander R.H.P. Carver, DSC, RN (8 April 1945)	Formed at RNAS Burscough on 25 October 1943 with 808, 886 and 897 Naval Air Squadrons, initially providing Supermarine Seafire fighter squadrons for HMS Hunter, HMS Attacker and HMS Stalker. It subsequently incorporated 885 Naval Air Squadron and operated from RNAS Lee-on-Solent in support of the Normandy landings. After moving to RAF Ballyhalbert, the wing re-equipped with Grumman Hellcats and included 800 and 1840 Naval Air Squadrons, operating with escort carriers in the British Pacific Fleet. The wing continued operations in the Far East in 1945 and was disbanded on 9 December 1945.
4th Naval Fighter Wing	4 Wing	Lieutenant Commander(A) A.C. Wallace, RNVR (25 October 1943); Lieutenant Commander(A) G.C. Baldwin, DSC, RN (3 June 1944)	Formed at RNAS Burscough on 25 October 1943 with 807, 809 and 879 Naval Air Squadron. Equipped with Supermarine Seafires, it subsequently operated in the Mediterranean, supporting operations in Italy and the southern France landings, before serving in the Aegean Sea and moving to the Eastern Fleet. The wing returned to the United Kingdom after the war and was disbanded at RAF Nutts Corner on 25 January 1946.
5th Naval Fighter Wing	5 Wing	Commander H.P. Sears, RN (28 February 1944); Commander T.G.C. Jameson, RN, Senior Officer Air (7 April 1944); Lieutenant Commander(A) T.W. Harrington, RN (9 September 1944)	Formed at RNAS Eglinton in December 1943 with 1839 and 1844 Naval Air Squadron, equipped with Grumman Hellcats, for HMS Begum. The squadrons later transferred to HMS Indomitable, and the wing operated with the Eastern Fleet before joining the British Pacific Fleet. On 30 June 1945 the squadrons were absorbed into the 11th Carrier Air Group, although the wing remained associated with HMS Indomitable until disbandment on 30 November 1945.
6th Naval Fighter Wing	6 Wing	Commander H.P. Sears, RN (28 February 1944); Major R.C. Hay, DSO & Bar DSC, RM (24 May 1944); Lieutenant Commander(A) R.L. Bigg-Wither, RN (14 August 1944)	Formed at RNAS Burscough in February 1944, initially with 1837 Naval Air Squadron. It embarked in HMS Atheling and subsequently transferred to HMS Illustrious and HMS Victorious, where it was absorbed into the 47th Naval Fighter Wing. Reformed with 1841 and 1842 Naval Air Squadrons for HMS Formidable, it took part in operations against the German battleship Tirpitz and subsequently operated in the Pacific. The wing was absorbed into the 2nd Carrier Air Group on 30 June 1945.
7th Naval Fighter Wing	7 Wing	Lieutenant Commander(A) M.F. Fell, DSO, RN (30 October 1943)	Formed at RNAS Eglinton on 30 October 1943 with 804 and 808 Naval Air Squadrons for HMS Emperor, 881 and 896 Naval Air Squadrons for HMS Pursuer, and 882 and 898 Naval Air Squadrons for HMS Searcher. Equipped with Grumman Wildcat and Grumman Hellcats, the squadrons operated from the three escort carriers in the Mediterranean and Indian Ocean areas. The wing was disbanded on 16 December 1944.
8th Naval TBR Wing	8 Wing	Lieutenant Commander R.S. Baker-Falkner, DSC, RN (25 October 1943); Lieutenant Commander R.D. Kingdon, DSC, RNVR (15 July 1944)	Formed on 25 October 1943 for HMS Furious with 827 and 830 Naval Air Squadrons, equipped with Fairey Barracudas. The wing participated in repeated attacks on the German battleship Tirpitz and other targets in Norwegian waters, including operations associated with the Operation Tungsten, Operation Mascot and Operation Goodwood attacks. Following the loss of Baker-Faulkner in July 1944, Kingdon assumed command. The wing disbanded on 3 October 1944 when 830 Naval Air Squadron was absorbed into 827 Naval Air Squadron.
9th Naval TBR Wing	9 Wing	Lieutenant Commander(A) A.J.I. Temple-West, RN (11 February 1944); Lieutenant Commander(A) W.R. Nowell, RN (1 August 1944)	Formed on 11 February 1944 with 820 and 826 Naval Air Squadrons for HMS Indefatigable, equipped with Fairey Barracudas. The wing operated off Norway, including attacks against Tirpitz, and participated in the carrier's operations in the Norwegian approaches. On 23 October 1944, 820 Naval Air Squadron absorbed 826 Naval Air Squadron, bringing the wing's existence to an end.
10th Naval Fighter Wing	10 Wing	Major P.P. Nelson-Gracie, RM (14 October 1944)	Formed at RNAS Eglinton on 14 October 1944 with 1843 and 1845 Naval Air Squadrons for the British Pacific Fleet, equipped with Vought Corsairs. In December 1944 the two squadrons embarked separately in Ruler-class escort carriers, so the wing did not subsequently operate as an intact formation. 1845 Naval Air Squadron temporarily ceased to exist in April 1945 before reforming, and both squadrons were ultimately absorbed into the 3rd Carrier Air Group on 30 June 1945.
11th Naval TBR Wing	11 Wing	Unidentified (21 April 1944)	Formed at RAF Ulunderpet, India, on 21 April 1944 by renumbering the 45th Naval TBR Wing. It comprised 822 and 823 Naval Air Squadrons, equipped with Fairey Barracudas. On 6 July 1944, 823 Naval Air Squadron was absorbed into 822 Naval Air Squadron, bringing the wing to an end.
12th Naval TBR Wing	12 Wing	Lieutenant Commander E.M. Britton, RN	Formed on 24 January 1944 with 815 and 817 Naval Air Squadrons and initially allocated to HMS Begum. The Barracuda-equipped squadrons subsequently transferred to HMS Indomitable and operated in the Eastern Fleet. The wing was disbanded on 28 December 1944.
15th Naval Fighter Wing	15 Wing	Lieutenant Commander J.W. Sleigh, DSC, RN (8 November 1943); Lieutenant Commander(A) R.J. Cork, DSO, DSC, RN (2 December 1943); Lieutenant Commander(A) A.M. Tritton, DSC and 2 Bars, RNVR (15 April 1944)	Formed at RNAS Stretton on 8 November 1943 with 1830, 1831 and 1833 Naval Air Squadrons, equipped with Vought Corsairs. After training and working-up, the wing joined HMS Illustrious and operated with the Eastern Fleet, including strikes in the Indian Ocean and operations against Japanese forces in the East Indies. It subsequently served with the British Pacific Fleet before returning to the United Kingdom and disbanding on 28 July 1945.
18th Naval MAC-Ship Wing	18 Wing	No leader identified; proposed wing	The 18th Naval MAC-Ship Wing was a proposed formation intended to coordinate Fleet Air Arm aircraft operating from Merchant Aircraft Carriers (MAC-ships). The concept was associated with the Fairey Swordfish-equipped 836 Naval Air Squadron, whose Flights operated from MAC-ships, but the proposed wing was not established as a normal operational wing.
21st Naval TBR Wing	21 Wing	Lieutenant Commander N.R. Corbet-Milward, RN (25 October 1943); Lieutenant Commander B.E. Boulding, DSC, RN (18 November 1943); Lieutenant Commander(A) A.J.B. Forde, RN (27 February 1944)	Formed at RNAS Machrihanish on 25 October 1943 with 810 and 847 Naval Air Squadrons, equipped with Fairey Barracudas, for HMS Illustrious. The wing joined the carrier and operated with the Eastern Fleet, but on 30 June 1944 810 Naval Air Squadron absorbed 847 Naval Air Squadron and the wing was disbanded.
24th Naval Fighter Wing	24 Wing	Lieutenant Commander N.G. Hallett, DSC, RN (31 December 1943); Lieutenant Commander B.F. Wiggington, DSC, RNVR (22 May 1944); Lieutenant Commander (A) A.J. Thomson, DSC, RNVR (1 November 1944); Lieutenant Commander N.G. Hallett, DSC, RN (12 March 1945)	Formed at RNAS Henstridge on 25 October 1943 with 887 and 894 Naval Air Squadrons, equipped with Supermarine Seafires. The wing joined HMS Indefatigable and operated initially in the Western Approaches and off Norway, including operations associated with the Operation Tungsten and Operation Offspring attacks. It subsequently accompanied HMS Indefatigable to the Eastern Fleet and took part in operations against Japanese targets, including the Palembang strikes and Operation Iceberg. The wing was absorbed into the 7th Carrier Air Group on 30 June 1945.
30th Naval Fighter Wing	30 Wing	Lieutenant Commander C.P. Campbell-Horsfall, RN (10 October 1944)	Formed at RNAS Machrihanish on 10 October 1944 for HMS Implacable with 801 and 880 Naval Air Squadrons, equipped with Supermarine Seafires. The wing embarked in HMS Implacable during November 1944 and sailed for the British Pacific Fleet in March 1945. It reached the Far East but was absorbed into the 8th Carrier Air Group on 30 June 1945, before it could undertake operations as a wing.
31st Naval TBR Wing	31 Wing	Lieutenant Commander W.H. Crawford, RN (proposed, 20 October 1943)	Proposed in October 1943 at RNAS Hatston for HMS Victorious, with 832 and 845 Naval Air Squadrons, both equipped with Fairey Barracudas. HMS Victorious was unavailable for the intended arrangement and formation of the wing was cancelled in November. The two squadrons were instead allocated to HMS Engadine for passage to the Far East. The proposed wing was therefore never operationally formed.
45th Naval TBR Wing	45 Wing	Lieutenant Commander B.E. Boulding, DSC, RN (25 October 1943); Lieutenant Commander G. Douglas, DFC, RN (1 December 1943); Leader unidentified (31 January 1944); Renumbered 11th Naval TBR Wing, 21 April 1944.	Formed on 25 October 1943 for service in HMS Indefatigable, with 822 and 823 Naval Air Squadrons, both equipped with Fairey Barracuda torpedo and dive bombers. The two squadrons subsequently embarked their aircraft aboard HMS Atheling for passage to the Eastern Fleet in February 1944. HMS Atheling arrived at Colombo, Ceylon, on 4 April, and subsequently proceeded to Madras, India, where the Fairey Barracudas of 822 and 823 Squadrons were unloaded on 11 and 12 April respectively for onward delivery to RAF Ulunderpet. On 21 April the wing was renumbered the 1th Naval TBR Wing.
47th Naval Fighter Wing	47 Wing	Lieutenant Commander(A) F.R.A. Turnbull, DSC, RN (17 January 1944); Major R.C. Hay, DSC, RM (14 August 1944; Lieutenant Colonel 12 December 1944)	Formed at RNAS Stretton on 17 January 1944 with 1834 and 1836 Naval Air Squadrons, equipped with Vought Corsairs, for HMS Victorious. 1837 Naval Air Squadron joined the wing in August 1944, after which the formation operated with HMS Victorious in the Indian Ocean and Pacific theatres. It participated in operations against Japanese forces, including strikes during the Okinawa campaign, before being absorbed into the 1st Carrier Air Group on 30 June 1945.
52nd Naval TBR Wing	52 Wing	Lieutenant Commander J.C.N. Shrubsole, RN (26 November 1943); Lieutenant Commander E.M. Britton, RN (5 January 1944); Lieutenant Commander(A) F.H. Fox, RN (24 January 1944); Lieutenant Commander V. Rance, OBE, RN (15 February 1944)	Formed on 26 November 1943 and initially allocated to HMS Victorious with 815 and 817 Naval Air Squadrons. Those squadrons instead embarked in HMS Begum and the formation became the 12th Naval TBR Wing. The 52nd Wing subsequently re-formed for HMS Victorious with 829 and 831 Naval Air Squadrons, later adding 827 Naval Air Squadron. It took part in operations against Tirpitz before 831 Naval Air Squadron absorbed 829 Naval Air Squadron and the wing disbanded on 9 July 1944.

Note: Abbreviation (A) signifies Air Branch of the RN or RNVR.

== Wing Codes 1943-1945 ==
The Fleet Air Arm also assigned letter codes to its naval air wings during the period 1943–45. The system used the letters A to Z, but the codes did not correspond numerically to the wing numbers: for example, the 15th Naval Fighter Wing was coded A, the 4th D, the 24th H, the 3rd K, the 6th L, and the 47th T. Of the 26 numbered formations represented in the code sequence, only 13 were actually formed or proposed, with the remainder allocated to wings that were never established. The system covered both Fighter and Torpedo, Bomber and Reconnaissance (TBR) wings, as well as the proposed 18th Naval MAC-Ship Wing, coded M. The codes therefore provided a separate means of identifying the wings alongside their numerical designations, rather than constituting an alternative numbering system.

List of Wing Codes of the Fleet Air Arms Naval Air Wings, applied between 1943 and 1945.
Letter	Wing	Active date
A	15th Naval Fighter Wing	November 1943 - July 1945
B	26	(not formed)
C	29	(not formed)
D	4th Naval Fighter Wing	October 1943 - November 1945
E	16	(not formed)
F	35	(not formed)
G	28	(not formed)
H	24th Naval Fighter Wing	November 1943 - June 1945
I	11th Naval TBR Wing	April 1944 - July 1944
J	44	(not formed)
K	3rd Naval Fighter Wing	November 1943 - October 1945
L	6th Naval Fighter Wing	February 1944 - June 1945
M	18th Naval MAC-Ship Wing	May 1943 - July 1945
N	40	(not formed)
O	10th Naval Fighter Wing	October 1944 - February 1945
P	30th Naval Fighter Wing	October 1944 - June 1945
Q	43	(not formed)
R	5th Naval Fighter Wing	December 1943 - June 1945
S	49	(not formed)
T	47th Naval Fighter Wing	January 1944 - June 1945
U	22	(not formed)
V	42	(not formed)
W	7th Naval Fighter Wing	October 1943 - December 1944
X	33	(not formed)
Y	37	(not formed)
Z	13	(not formed)

== Carrier Air Groups ==
The Fleet Air Arm began replacing aircraft wings with Carrier Air Groups (CAGs) in late 1944 as part of the reorganisation undertaken for operations with the British Pacific Fleet. The CAG system followed United States Navy practice, grouping fighter and torpedo‑bomber squadrons into a single, permanently associated embarked air unit rather than the separate wing structure used earlier in the war.

This change provided a more integrated command arrangement, simplified aircraft allocation, and aligned British carrier aviation with the operational doctrine of the Allied fleet.

As carriers returned to home waters in 1945, the remaining Naval Fighter and TBR Wings were disbanded and replaced by numbered Carrier Air Groups, marking the end of the wing system introduced only two years earlier.

== See also ==
- List of Fleet Air Arm aircraft squadrons
- List of aircraft units of the Royal Navy
- List of aircraft carriers of the Royal Navy
- List of escort carriers of the Royal Navy
- List of air stations of the Royal Navy
