= List of aircraft units of the Royal Navy =

This is a List of aircraft units of the Royal Navy.

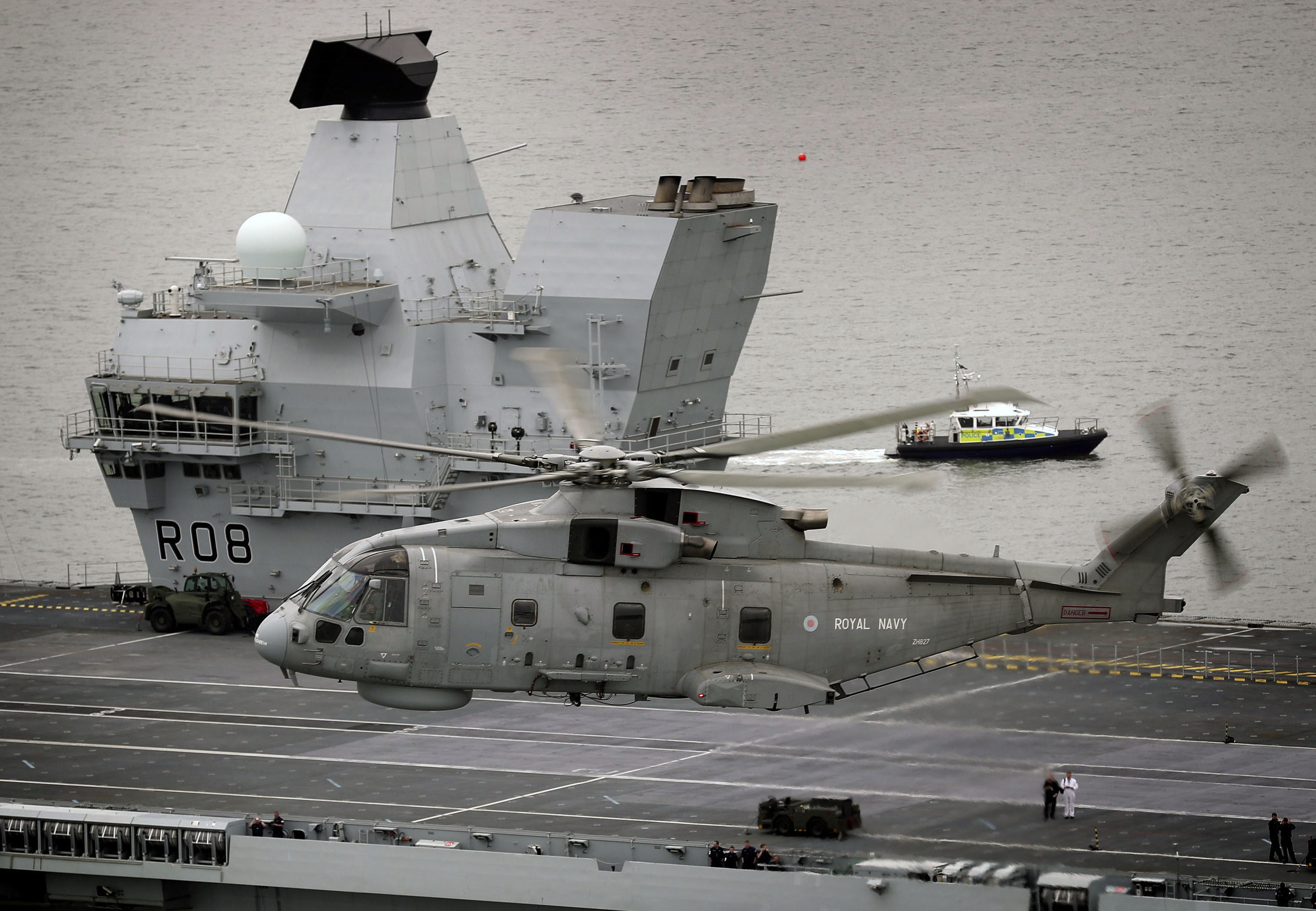
Merlin HM2 of 820 Squadron in flight over HMS Queen Elizabeth

== Naval Air Wings 1943 - 1945 ==
List of Royal Navy, Fleet Air Arm, Naval Air Wings between 1943 and 1945:

- 2nd Naval TBR Wing (24 January 1944 - Unknown) renamed No. 2 Strike Wing on 10 December 1944
- 3rd Naval Fighter Wing (25 October 1944 - 9 December 1945)
- 4th Naval Fighter Wing (25 October 1943 - 25 January 1946)
- 5th Naval Fighter Wing (December 1943 - 30 November 1945)
- 6th Naval Fighter Wing (February 1944 - 30 June 1945)
- 7th Naval Fighter Wing (30 October 1943 - 16 December 1944)
- 8th Naval TBR Wing (25 October 1943 - 3 October 1944)
- 9th Naval TBR Wing (11 February 1944 - 23 October 1944)
- 10th Naval Fighter Wing (14 October 1944 - 30 June 1945)
- 11th Naval TBR Wing (21 April 1944 - 6 July 1944)
- 12th Naval TBR Wing (24 January 1944 - 28 December 1944)
- 15th Naval Fighter Wing (8 November 1943 - 28 July 1945)
- 18th Naval MAC-Ship Wing - see 836 Naval Air Squadron
- 21st Naval TBR Wing (25 October 1943 - 30 June 1944)
- 24th Naval Fighter Wing (25 October 1943 - 30 June 1945)
- 30th Naval Fighter Wing (10 October 1944 - 30 June 1945)
- 45th Naval TBR Wing (25 October 1943 - 21 April 1944)
- 47th Naval Fighter Wing (17 January 1944 - (30 June 1945)
- 52nd Naval TBR Wing (26 November 1943 - 9 July 1944)

== Carrier Air Groups 1945 - 1954 ==
List of Royal Navy, Fleet Air Arm, Carrier Air Groups between 1945 and 1954:

- 1st Carrier Air Group (June - October 1945, October 1947 - May 1951)
- 2nd Carrier Air Group (June - October 1945)
- 3rd Carrier Air Group (August - October 1945)
- 7th Carrier Air Group (June 1945 - March 1946) reformed as the 7th Night Air Group
- 7th Night Air Group (December 1950 - June 1951)
- 8th Carrier Air Group (June 1945 - April 1946)
- 11th Carrier Air Group (June - November 1945)
- 13th Carrier Air Group (June 1945 - August 1946, October 1946 - November 1950, August 1951 - December 1952)
- 14th Carrier Air Group (June 1945 - July 1946, October 1946 - December 1947, January 1948 - May 1952)
- 15th Carrier Air Group (June 1945 - March 1947, May 1947 - January 1952)
- 16th Carrier Air Group (June 1945 - October 1947)
- 17th Carrier Air Group (October 1947 - October 1949, October 1949 - May 1950, March - December 1952)
- 20th Carrier Air Group (March 1946 - July 1948)

== Training Air Groups 1946 - 1954 ==
List of Royal Navy, Fleet Air Arm, Training Air Groups between 1946 and 1954:

- 50th Training Air Group (May 1948 - January 1952)
- 51st Training Air Group (May - November 1946)
- 51st Miscellaneous Air Group (July 1948 - January 1950)
- 52nd Training Air Group (August 1946 - March 1947, February 1950 - August 1951)
- 53rd Training Air Group (June 1950 - January 1952)

== Aircraft Force ==
Various Aircraft Force Commanders managed FAA aircraft under the Command of Fleet Assistant Chief of Staff (Aviation), later ACNS (Aviation and Carriers).

- Commando Helicopter Force (CHF) (June 1984 - present)
- Lynx Helicopter Force (LHF) (June 2001 - July 2012) became Lynx Wildcat Maritime Force (LWMF)
- Lynx Wildcat Maritime Force (LWMF) (July 2012 - March 2017) became Wildcat Maritime Force (WMF)
- Wildcat Maritime Force (WMF) (March 2017 - present)
- Merlin Helicopter Force (MHF) (January 2000 - present)
- Sea King Helicopter Force (SKF) (September 2001 - September 2018)
- Sea Harrier Force (SHAR) (April 2000 - March 2006)
- Naval Strike Wing (NSW) (March 2007 - April 2010)
- Fixed Wing Force (FWF) (May 2013 - present)

== Carrier Ships' Flights ==
List of aircraft carriers and their ships’ flights active dates:

- HMS Albion (September 1954 - July 1958)
- HMS Ark Royal (March 1955 - June 1977)
- HMS Begum (July - October 1945)
- HMS Bulwark (September 1954 - October 1957)
- HMS Campania (April - December 1952)
- HMS Centaur (July 1954 - September 1965)
- HMS Eagle (January 1953 - January 1972)
- HMS Emperor (May - November 1944)
- HMS Formidable (June - July 1944)
- HMS Glory (1947 - September 1954)
- HMS Hermes (May 1960 - April 1978)
- HMS Illustrious (1945 - December 1954)
- HMS Implacable (1948-1950)
- HMS Indomitable (November 1941 - April 1953)
- HMS Invincible (April - December 1980)
- HMS Ocean (September 1946 - September 1957)
- HMS Premier (August - September 1945)
- HMS Theseus (November 1946 - October 1953)
- HMS Triumph (January 1947 - December 1955)
- HMS Unicorn (June 1950 - March 1953)
- HMS Venerable (February 1946 - February 1947)
- HMS Vengeance (April 1947 - May 1951)
- HMS Victorious (January 1945 - March 1968)
- HMS Warrior (October 1953 - October 1957)

== Station flights ==
- RNAS Abbotsinch
  - Stinson Reliant I, Supermarine Sea Otter, de Havilland Dominie, Hawker Sea Hawk FB.3, Fairey Gannet T.2 & T.5, de Havilland Sea Vampire T.22 & Boulton Paul Sea Balliol T.21
- RNAS Anthorn
  - Airspeed Oxford, Beech Traveller I, Fairey Swordfish II, Supermarine Seafire III & F.17, de Havilland Tiger Moth II, Avro Anson I, North American Harvard IIa, de Havilland Dominie, Westland Dragonfly HR.3, Fairey Firefly FR.5 & T.2, Fairey Gannet T.2, Hawker Sea Hawk F.1 & de Havilland Sea Venom FAW.20
- RNAS Arbroath
- RNAS Ayr
- RNAS Ballyhalbert
- RNAS Bankstown
- Belfast?
- RNAS Bramcote
- RNAS Brawdy
- Brunswick
- RNAS Burscough
- RNAS China Bay
- RNAS Colombo Racecourse
- RNAS Church Fenton
- RNAS Culdrose
- RNAS Culham
- RNAS Dale
- Dkeheila?
- RNAS Donibristle
- RNAS Drem
- RNAS Dunino
- East Haven?
- Eastleigh (Kenya or Southampton?)
- RNAS Eglinton
- RNAS Evanton
- RNAS Fearn
- RNAY Fleetlands
- RNAS Ford
- HMS Siskin (Gosport)
- HMS Falcon (Hal Far)
- RNAS Hatston
- RNAS Henstridge
- RNAS Heston
- RNAS Inskip
- HMS Nabswick (Jervis Bay)
- RNAS Kai Tak
- HMS Ukussa (Katukurunda)
- RNAS Lee-on-Solent
- RAF Linton-on-Ouse
- RNAS Lossiemouth
- RNAS Machrihanish
- RNAS Maryborough
- RNAS Maydown
- RNAS Merryfield
- RNAS Piarco
- HMS Naboran (Ponam)
- RNAS Portland
- RNAS Prestwick
- Puttalam?
- RNAS Rattray
- RNAS Ronaldsway
- RNAS St Merryn
- HMS Nabthorpe (Schofields)
- RNAS Sembawang
- RAF Speke
- RNAS Stretton
- Tambaram?
- Tanga?
- RNAS Twatt
- RNAS Woodvale
- RNAS Worthy Down
- RNAS Yeovilton

== Air Station Helicopter SAR Flights ==
List of Air Station Search and Rescue (SAR) Flights, (generally parented by Station Flights, usually not part of a numbered squadron):

- RNAS Anthorn (December 1953 - November 1956), part of Station Flight.
- RNAS Brawdy (March 1953 - January 1971), part of Station Flight.
- RNAS Culdrose (May 1953 - June 1974), part of Station Flight.
- RNAS Eglinton (December 1952 - March 1959), part of Station Flight from February 1954.
- RNAS Hal Far (December 1952 - August 1965), part of Station Flight 1953 - 63.
- RNAS Lee-on-Solent (November 1972 - March 1982), independent SAR Flight. (February 1983 - August 1985), 772 NAS 'C' Flight. (August 1985 - March 1988), independent SAR Flight.
- RNAS Lossiemouth (March 1955 - February 1973), part of Station Flight.
- RNAS Portland (May 1959 - March 1964), Station Flight. Resident helicopter squadrons from March 1964.
- RNAS Prestwick (July 1989 - December 2015), autonomous SAR Flight.
- RNAS Yeovilton (December 1955 - January 1974), part of Station Flight.

== Aircraft Ferry Units 1942 - 1968 ==
List of various FAA Ferry Units:

- Ferry Pool, Arbroath
- Ferry Pool Anthorn (November 1944 - February 1945, 1949 - 1958) became No.4 Ferry Pool in 1945.
- Ferry Pool Belfast (September 1945 - March 1946)
- Ferry Pool Culham (September 1945 - January 1946)
- Ferry Pool Donibristle (April 1942 - November 1945), became No. 5 Ferry Squadron.
- Ferry Pool Stretton (September 1945 - January 1946), became No. 5 Ferry Pool.
- Ferry Pool Worthy Down (June - November 1945), became No. 6 Ferry Pool.
- No. 1 Ferry Pool (February 1946 - September 1946), became No. 1 Ferry Squadron.
- No. 2 Ferry Pool (February 1946 - May 1947), became No. 2 Ferry Flight.
- No. 4 Ferry Pool (February 1945 - June 1947), became No. 3 Ferry Flight.
- No. 5 Ferry Pool (January 1946)
- No. 6 Ferry Pool (November 1945 - February 1946)
- No. I Ferry Squadron (September 1946 - February 1947), became No. 1 Ferry Flight.
- No. 2 Ferry Squadron (January 1946 - June 1947), became No. 2 Ferry Flight.
- No. 5 Ferry Squadron (November 1945 - September 1946), became No. 4 Ferry Flight.
- No. 1 Ferry Flight (February 1947 - August 1950)
- No. 2 Ferry Flight (May 1947 - 1950)
- No. 3 Ferry Flight (June 1947 - 1949), became Ferry Pool Anthorn in 1949.
- No. 4 Ferry Flight (September 1946 - 1950)
- Naval Ferry Flight Belfast (1950-1954), civilian operated.
- Shorts Ferry Flight Rochester (November 1950 - January 1968), civilian operated.

== Westland Sea King Flights 1990 - 2006 ==
List of Westland Sea King HAS.5, HU.5 and HAS.6 helicopter flights between 1990 and 2017, (these are for autonomous single aircraft units, not detachments from squadrons):

- A Flight (active 10 December 1989 - disbanded 31 August 1998)
  - parent 826 Naval Air Squadron, to 819 Naval Air Squadron 30 July 1993, to 810 Naval Air Squadron 1 November 1994
- A Flight (active 2 July 2001 - disbanded 4 December 2002)
  - parent 810 Naval Air Squadron, to 771 Naval Air Squadron 26 July 2001
- A Flight (active 1 July 2003 - disbanded 8 May 2006)
  - parent 771 Naval Air Squadron
- B Flight (active 13 May 1990 - disbanded 8 May 2006)
  - parent 826 Naval Air Squadron, to 819 Naval Air Squadron 30 July 1993, to 810 Naval Air Squadron 1 November 1994, to 771 Naval Air Squadron 26 July 2001
- C Flight (active 1 January 1993 - disbanded 9 November 1994)
  - parent 826 Naval Air Squadron, to 819 Naval Air Squadron 30 July 1993
- D Flight (active 1 January 1993 - disbanded 9 November 1994)
  - parent 826 Naval Air Squadron, to 819 Naval Air Squadron 30 July 1993

== Westland Lynx Flights 1977 - 2017 ==
List of Westland Lynx HAS.2, HAS.3 and HMA.8 helicopter flights since 1977, (parented by 700L Naval Air Squadron from July 1977, then by 702 Naval Air Squadron on formation in January 1978, then by 815 Naval Air Squadron on formation in January 1981. Some flights transferred to 829 Naval Air Squadron in September 1986, but returned to 815 NAS in March 1993):

- 200 Flight (active 4 July 1977 - disbanded 1 April 2014)
- 201 Flight (active 1 November 1977 - transferred to JRRF 11 September 2005)
- 202 Flight (active 3 January 1978 - disbanded 21 September 2015)
- 203 Flight (active 3 January 1978 - 30 May 1983, 6 August 1983 - disbanded 31 August 2015)
- 204 Flight (active 11 April 1978 - 18 April 1994, 2 April 1997 - transferred to JRRF 1 September 1995)
- 205 Flight (active 8 May 1978 - absorbed by 220 Flight 11 April 1982)
- 206 Flight (active 14 August 1978 - disbanded 1 March 2016)
- 207 Flight (active 26 July 1978 - lost with ship Falklands 22 May 1982, 5 September 1985 - disbanded 10 September 2016)
- 208 Flight (active 9 October 1978 - 15 April 1991, 22 November 1991 - disbanded 31 March 2017)
- 209 Flight (active 20 November 1978 - transferred to JRRF 30 November 2005)
- 210 Flight (active 18 December 1978 - disbanded 31 August 2015)
- 211 Flight (active 25 June 1979 - 18 February 1983, 14 March 1983 - disbanded 31 March 2015)
- 212 Flight (active 8 March 1979 - lost with ship Falklands 25 May 1982, 9 February 1987 - disbanded 1 February 2011)
- 213 Flight (active 24 September 1979 - lost with ship Falklands 10 May 1982)
- 214 Flight (active 21 January 1980 - disbanded 1 December 2015)
- 215 Flight (active 25 June 1979 - 10 August 2000, 1 July 2002 - disbanded 31 March 2017)
- 216 Flight (active 18 October 1979 - lost with ship Falklands 24 May 1982, 1 July 1985 - disbanded 4 August 2000)
- 217 Flight (active 1 August 1979 - 30 June 1982, 1 June 1985 - disbanded 10 December 2015)
- 218 Flight (active 14 July 1980 - disbanded 22 March 2010)
- 219 Flight (active 16 October 1980 - disbanded 10 December 2015)
- 220 Flight (active 1 July 1981 - disbanded 31 August 1987)
- 221 Flight (active 25 February 1980 - disbanded 10 May 2010)
- 222 Flight (active 17 November 1980 - disbanded 1 February 1994)
- 223 Flight (active 6 September 1982 - disbanded 30 July 1993)
- 224 Flight (active 23 April 1982 - disbanded 6 November 1990)
- 226 Flight (active 2 October 1989 - disbanded 21 September 2015)
- 227 Flight (active 31 August 1983 - transferred to JRRF 18 April 2005)
- 228 Flight (active 12 July 1982 - disbanded 31 January 2013)
- 229 Flight (active 20 June 1983 - disbanded 31 March 2017)
- 230 Flight (active 16 April 1980 - became Lynx Operational Flying Training Unit (LOFTU) 31 August 1989)
- 231 Flight (active 22 October 1984 - disbanded 10 December 1993)
- 232 Flight (active 6 September 1982 - disbanded 31 March 1994)
- 233 Flight (active 2 March 1987 - disbanded 31 March 1994)
- 234 Flight (active 30 August 1988 - disbanded 20 January 2016)
- 235 Flight (active 14 June 1982 - disbanded 17 October 2000)
- 236 Flight (active 29 November 1982 - became 238 Flight 30 June 1990)
- 237 Flight (active 2 May 1989 - disbanded 31 March 1992)
- 238 Flight (active 2 July 1990 - disbanded 24 April 1992)
- 239 Flight (active 1 June 1981 - disbanded 31 March 2017)
- 240 Flight (active 17 April 1982 - became 205 Flight 10 September 1982)
- 241 Flight (active 14 June 1982 - disbanded 3 October 2000)
- 242 Flight (active 7 July 1982 - absorbed into Lynx OEU 2 June 1993)
- 243 Flight (active 7 June 1982 - disbanded 30 March 1992)
- 244 Flight (active 2 July 1984 - transferred to JRRF 16 September 2005)
- 245 Flight (active 1 November 1988 - disbanded 18 November 1994)
- 246 Flight (active 9 January 1989 - transferred to JRRF 16 September 2006)

== AgustaWestland Wildcat Flights 2014 - present ==
List of AgustaWestland Wildcat HMA.2 helicopter flights since 2014, (parenting of the Flights is shared between 815 and 825 Naval Air Squadrons):

- 201 Flight (active 1 May 2014 - present) [note parented by 700W Naval Air Squadron between 1 May 2014 and 1 August 2014], then 825 Naval Air Squadron.
- 202 Flight (active October 2016 - present) parent 815 Naval Air Squadron.
- 204 Flight (active 1 November 2015 - present) parent 825 Naval Air Squadron.
- 205 Flight (active 1 October 2015 - present) parent 825 Naval Air Squadron.
- 209 Flight (active 1 March 2016 - present) parent 825 Naval Air Squadron.
- 212 Flight (active 24 April 2016 - present) parent 815 Naval Air Squadron.
- 213 Flight (active 31 March 2016 - present) parent 815 Naval Air Squadron.
- 216 Flight (active 2016 - present) parent 815 Naval Air Squadron.

== Communications flights ==
- HMS Bherunda (Ceylon (Sri Lanka))
- Christchurch?
- RNAY Sulur (Coimbatore)
- HMS Grebe (Dekheila)
- RNAS Donibristle (Donibristle)
- RAF Fayid (Fayid)
- RAF Ta' Qali (Malta, Ta Kali)

== Other flights ==
- RN Night Fighter Flight -> RN Fighter Flight
- Test Flight, Trincomalee

== See also ==
- List of aircraft wings of the Royal Navy
- List of Fleet Air Arm aircraft squadrons
- List of Fleet Air Arm groups
