= 11th Naval TBR Wing =

Royal Navy Fleet Air Arm aircraft wing

11th Naval TBR Wing 45th Naval TBR Wing
- White Ensign
- Active: 25 October 1943 – 6 July 1944
- Country: United Kingdom
- Branch: Royal Navy
- Type: Naval TBR Wing
- Role: Carrier-based Torpedo, bomber and reconnaissance
- Size: Two squadrons
- Part of: Fleet Air Arm
- Engagements: World War II

Aircraft flown
- Bomber: Fairey Barracuda

11th Naval TBR Wing ("11 Wing") was a Fleet Air Arm torpedo bomber reconnaissance formation of the Royal Navy during the Second World War. Originally formed as the 45th Naval TBR Wing on 25 October 1943 intended for service aboard the aircraft carrier HMS Indefatigable, it was formed of 822 and 823 Naval Air Squadrons, both equipped with Fairey Barracuda torpedo and dive bomber aircraft. The wing was renumbered the 11th Naval TBR Wing on 21 April 1944, after the squadrons' aircraft had been transported to India aboard HMS Atheling for service with the Eastern Fleet. The wing ceased to exist on 6 July 1944, when 823 Squadron was absorbed into 822 Squadron.

== History ==
=== Formation as the 45th Naval TBR Wing ===
The 45th Naval TBR Wing was formed on 25 October 1943 intended for service aboard the Implacable-class aircraft carrier HMS Indefatigable. It comprised 822 and 823 Naval Air Squadrons, both equipped with Fairey Barracuda, a British carrier-borne torpedo and dive bomber. Although the two squadrons were assigned to the wing, they did not assemble as a combined formation before their movement to the Eastern Fleet.

The aircraft of the squadrons were transported east on the Ruler-class escort carrier HMS Atheling. On 26 February 1944, twelve Fairey Barracuda Mk.IIs from 822 Naval Air Squadron were flown out from RNAS Burscough in Lancashire, while twelve aircraft from 823 Naval Air Squadron were loaded as cargo from Renfrew, Renfrewshire. HMS Atheling, assigned to the Eastern Fleet, departed on 3 March as part of convoy KMF.29A and arrived in Colombo, Ceylon, on 4 April. After continuing to Madras, India, the vessel unloaded the aircraft from 822 and 823 Squadrons on 11 and 12 April, respectively, for subsequent delivery to RAF Ulunderpet, Tamil Nadu, India.

=== Renumbering and disbandment ===
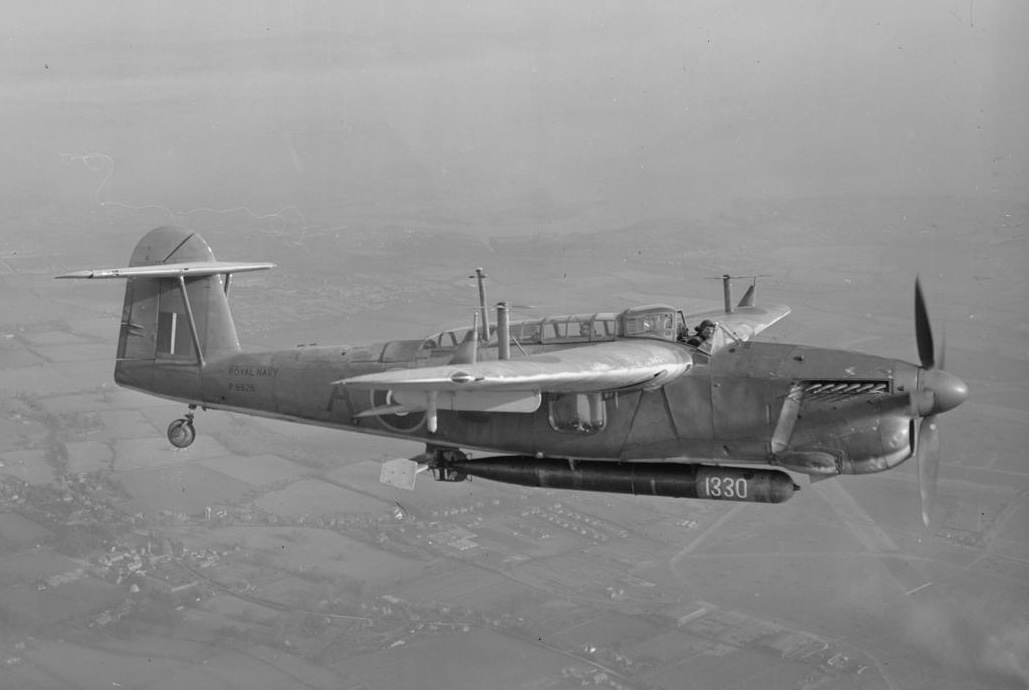
Fairey Barracuda Mk.II

On 21 April 1944, the 45th Naval TBR Wing was renumbered the 11th Naval TBR Wing at RAF Ulunderpet. The Wing continued to comprise 822 and 823 Naval Air Squadrons, operating with the Fairey Barracuda aircraft.

The Wing's existence ended on 6 July 1944, when 823 Squadron was absorbed into 822 Squadron. The enlarged 822 Squadron continued to operate Fairey Barracudas after the wing's disbandment, embarking in the Illustrious-class aircraft carrier HMS Victorious for an attack in Sigli, Northern Sumatra; (this activity belonged to the subsequent history of 822 Squadron rather than to the disbanded wing).

== Squadrons ==
The wing was associated with the following Fleet Air Arm squadrons:

- 822 Naval Air Squadron (served in both the 45th and 11th Naval TBR Wings)
- 823 Naval Air Squadron (served in both wing designations)

== Naval air stations and carrier movements ==
- Royal Naval Air Station Burscough (HMS Ringtail), Lancashire.
  - Twelve Fairey Barracuda Mk.IIs of 822 Naval Air Squadron flew out to the escort carrier HMS Atheling on 26 February.
- Renfrew, Renfrewshire.
  - Twelve Fairey Barracuda Mk.IIs of 823 Naval Air Squadron came aboard HMS Atheling at Renfrew, all were stowed as cargo.
- HMS Atheling.
  - Carried the squadrons' aircraft east in February and March 1944. The aircraft were unloaded at Madras in April for onward delivery to RAF Ulunderpet.
- Royal Air Force Ulunderpet, Tamil Nadu, India.
  - The Wing's location when it was renumbered the 11th Naval TBR Wing on 21 April 1944; it remained associated with 822 and 823 Naval Air Squadrons until the latter's absorption into 822 Squadron in July.

== Aircraft ==
Both wing's two constituent squadrons operated with one type of torpedo bomber aircraft:

- Fairey Barracuda Mk.II torpedo and dive bomber (1943 - 1944)

== Wing leaders ==
The recorded commanding officers of the 45th Naval TBR Wing were:

- Lieutenant Commander B.E. Boulding, DSC, RN – 25 October 1943
- Lieutenant Commander G. Douglas, DFC, RN – 1 December 1943
- Unidentified – 31 January 1944

The recorded leader of the 11th Naval TBR Wing was unidentified from 21 April 1944.

== See also ==
- Fleet Air Arm
- List of aircraft wings of the Royal Navy
- 822 Naval Air Squadron
- 823 Naval Air Squadron
- HMS Indefatigable
- HMS Atheling
- Eastern Fleet
