= 823 Naval Air Squadron =

Inactive flying squadron of the Royal Navy's Fleet Air Arm

- Squadron badge
- Active: Royal Air Force: 1933–1939; Royal Navy: 1939–1940; 1941–1944
- Disbanded: 6 July 1944
- Country: United Kingdom
- Branch: Royal Navy
- Type: Torpedo Bomber Reconnaissance squadron
- Role: Carrier-based: anti-submarine warfare (ASW); anti-surface warfare (ASuW)
- Part of: Fleet Air Arm
- Mottos: Vigueur de dessus (French for 'Strength from above')
- Engagements: World War II
- Battle honours: Norway 1940

Insignia
- Squadron Badge Description: White, per fess and barry wavy of four blue and white in chief an eagle volant to the sinister black base a Maltese Cross party per pale white and red ( 1937)
- Identification Markings: 801-806, 820-834 (IIIF ); 801-814 (Seal ); 801-814 (Swordfish); G4A+ (Swordfish May 1939); 4A+ (Swordfish December 1940); single letters (Swordfish November 1941); single letters (Albacore); single letters (Barracuda)

Aircraft flown
- Bomber: Fairey Swordfish; Fairey Albacore; Fairey Barracuda
- Reconnaissance: Fairey IIIF; Fairey Seal

823 Naval Air Squadron (823 NAS), also referred as 823 Squadron, was a Fleet Air Arm (FAA) naval air squadron of the United Kingdom’s Royal Navy (RN). It was active as part of the Royal Air Force (RAF) before World War II and part of the Royal Navy during it. It most recently operated with Fairey Barracuda between June 1943 and July 1944.

The squadron, which was formed in April 1933, functioned as a carrier-based unit established by merging the Fairey III aircraft from the 441 and 448 Fleet (Spotter Reconnaissance) Flights of the Royal Air Force RAF into the newly created Fleet Air Arm of the RAF. During its time with the RAF, the squadron utilised a range of aircraft, such as the Fairey Seal and Fairey Swordfish. After its transition to the Royal Navy, it went on to operate the Fairey Albacore in the midst of the Second World War.

== History ==
=== Pre-war (1933-1939) ===
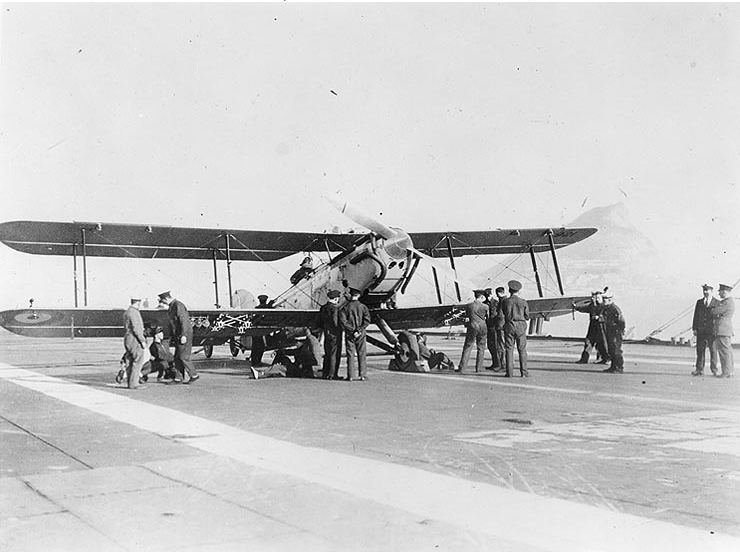
Fairey IIIF; an example of the type used by 823 Squadron

823 Naval Air Squadron was formed on 3 April 1933 by a merger of Nos. 441 and 448 Fleet (Spotter Reconnaissance) Flights aboard HMS Glorious, a battlecruiser converted to an aircraft carrier in the 1920s. The new squadron was equipped with Fairey IIIFs and served in the Mediterranean. The vessel made its way back home in May 1934 for maintenance, while the squadron was temporarily reassigned to sister ships and lead ship of her class HMS Courageous. In December, it was re-equipped with six Fairey Seal aircraft from 820 Squadron, which increased to the full complement of twelve when it departed with six each aboard HMS Glorious and HMS Courageous for the Mediterranean in August 1935. In October, the entire squadron convened with HMS Glorious, and in November 1936, it was re-equipped with twelve Fairey Swordfish torpedo bombers, transforming into a Torpedo Spotter Reconnaissance squadron. It made a brief return home to participate in the Coronation Review Flypast at Spithead on 20 May 1937, before heading back to the Mediterranean.

The squadron was taken over by the Admiralty on 24 May 1939 at RAF Hal Far, Malta.

=== World War II (1939-1944) ===
At the onset of the war, the squadron was embarked in HMS Glorious, which was located in the Mediterranean. The carrier was promptly dispatched to the Red Sea and Indian Ocean, with the dual purpose of safeguarding British and French trade routes and locating German shipping vessels. She made her return to the Mediterranean in January 1940, but was subsequently recalled to home waters following the German invasion of Norway in April 1940.

On June 8, she was sunk by the Scharnhorst-class battleships of Nazi Germany’s Kriegsmarine: Scharnhorst and Gneisenau, while traveling from Norway to Scotland, with half of 823 on board at that moment. Subsequently, the squadron functioned with a diminished capacity of nine aircraft. On 21 June, six aircraft from 821 and 823 Squadrons, operating from RNAS Hatston (HMS Sparrowhawk), Mainland, Orkney,, attempted a daylight torpedo attack on the Scharnhorst, resulting in the loss of one aircraft from 823 Squadron.

The squadron was dissolved at RNAS Hatston on Orkney on 3 December 1940.

On November 1, 1941, the squadron was re-established at RNAS Crail (HMS Jackdaw), Fife, with nine Fairey Swordfish Is. In April 1942, these were replaced by nine Fairey Albacore torpedo bombers, which boarded HMS Furious in August for convoy escort operations, disembarking the subsequent month to conduct anti-submarine patrols in the English Channel alongside RAF Coastal Command. In June 1943, the unit was re-equipped with four Fairey Barracuda Mk IIs, a British carrier-borne torpedo and dive bomber, which increased to twelve by September, just prior to its assignment to the 45th Naval TBR Wing.

However, the aircraft were instead loaded onto the Ruler-class escort carrier HMS Atheling in February 1944, and squadron personnel travelled on HMT Strathnaver in March for their journey east, subsequently continuing on HMT Aronda from Port Said, Egypt. Upon reaching Madras in India, they resumed flying and conducted work-up with the 11th Naval TBR Wing; nevertheless, the squadron was disbanded at RNAS Katukurunda (HMS Ukussa), Ceylon, on 6 July to expand 822 Squadron.

== Aircraft operated ==
The squadron operated a variety of different aircraft and versions:

- Fairey IIIF reconnaissance biplane (April 1933 - December 1934)
- Fairey Seal spotter-reconnaissance aircraft (December 1934 - December 1936)
- Fairey Swordfish I torpedo bomber (November 1936 - December 1940, November 1941 - March 1942)
- Fairey Swordfish II torpedo bomber (February - March 1942)
- Fairey Albacore torpedo bomber (March 1942 - May 1943)
- Fairey Barracuda II torpedo and dive bomber (June 1943 - July 1944)

== Battle honours ==
The following Battle Honours have been awarded to 823 Naval Air Squadron:

- Norway 1940

== Assignments ==
823 Naval Air Squadron was assigned as needed to form part of a number of larger units:

- 45th Naval TBR Wing (25 October 1943 - 21 April 1944)
- 11th Naval TBR Wing (21 April 1944 - 6 July 1944)

== Commanding officers ==
List of commanding officers of 823 Naval Air Squadron with date of appointment:

1933 - 1940

- Lieutenant Commander J.H.F. Burroughs, RN, (Flight Lieutenant, RAF), from 3 April 1933
- Flight Lieutenant M.M. Freehill, DFC, RAF, from 26 May 1933
- Lieutenant Commander C.B. Tidd, RN, (Squadron Leader, RAF), from 18 August 1933
- Flight Lieutenant M.M. Freehill, DFC, RAF, from 1 September 1934
- Lieutenant Commander G.C. Dickins, RN, (Squadron Leader, RAF), from 30 August 1935
- Lieutenant Commander D.W. MacKendrick, RN, (Squadron Leader, RAF), from 21 May 1937 (Commander - 31 December 1937)
- Lieutenant Commander R.A. Kilroy, RN, (Squadron Leader, RAF), from 1 February 1938
- Lieutenant Commander R.D. Watkins, RN, from 24 May 1939
- Lieutenant Commander C.J.T. Stephens, RN, from 21 April 1940 ( † 8 June 1940)
- Lieutenant Commander D.H. Elles, RN, from 3 July 1940
- disbanded - 3 December 1940

1941 - 1944

- Lieutenant Commander(A) A.J.D. Harding, DSC, RN, from 1 November 1941
- Lieutenant Commander J.W. Collett, RN, from 1 August 1942
- Lieutenant R.W. Spackman, RN, from 24 November 1942
- Lieutenant Commander G. Douglas, DFC, RNR, from 22 March 1943
- Lieutenant Commander(A) L.C. Watson, DSC, RNVR, from 1 December 1943
- disbanded - 6 July 1944

Note: Abbreviation (A) signifies Air Branch of the RN or RNVR.
