= Fairey III =

Family of British reconnaissance biplanes

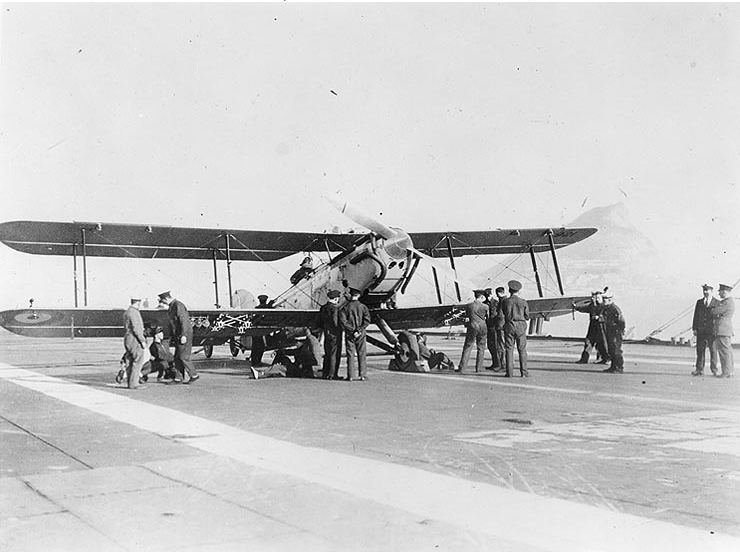
- Fairey IIIF on HMS Furious

General information
- Type: reconnaissance aircraft
- Manufacturer: Fairey Aviation
- Primary users: Royal Air Force Fleet Air Arm
- Number built: 964

History
- Introduction date: 1918
- First flight: 14 September 1917
- Retired: 1942
- Variants: Fairey Gordon; Fairey Seal

The Fairey Aviation Company Fairey III was a family of British reconnaissance biplanes that enjoyed a very long production and service history in both landplane and seaplane variants. First flying on 14 September 1917, examples were still in use during the Second World War.

== Design and development ==
The prototype of the Fairey III was the N.10 floatplane, which was designed and built in 1917 by Fairey Aviation (along with the smaller N.9) to meet Admiralty Specification N.2(a) for a carrier-based seaplane for the Royal Naval Air Service during the First World War. N.10, also known by its constructor's number F.128 was a two-bay biplane with folding wings and powered by a 260 hp (190 kW) Sunbeam Maori engine. It first flew from the Port Victoria seaplane station on the Isle of Grain, Kent on 14 September 1917.

Following tests both as a floatplane and with a conventional wheeled undercarriage, production orders were placed for two versions both powered by the Maori, the IIIA and IIIB, with 50 and 60 aircraft planned, respectively. The Fairey IIIA was a reconnaissance aircraft intended to operate from aircraft carriers, and as such was fitted with a wheeled or skid undercarriage, while the IIIB was intended as a floatplane bomber, with larger span (increased from 46 ft 2 in/14.19 m to 62 ft 9 in/19.13 m) upper wings and a bombload of three 230 lb (105 kg) bombs. While all 50 IIIAs were built, only 28 of the IIIBs were completed as intended, as a new improved bomber/reconnaissance floatplane, the Fairey IIIC was available, of which 36 were produced, which reverted to short equal-span wings like the IIIA but was powered by the much more powerful and reliable 375 hp (280 kW) Rolls-Royce Eagle VIII engine and could still carry a useful bombload. Many of the IIIBs were completed as IIICs.

The first major production model was the IIID, which was an improved IIIC, with provision for a third crewmember and capable of being fitted with either a floatplane or a conventional wheeled undercarriage. It first flew in August 1920, powered by a Rolls-Royce Eagle, and initial production for the Fleet Air Arm, together with aircraft produced for Australia and Portugal retained the Eagle, while later aircraft were powered by the more powerful Napier Lion. The naval variants were usually three-seaters (pilot, observer and gunner); and the wings could be folded back parallel to the fuselage for storage aboard ship. In floatplane configuration, carrier-borne Fairey IIIs would be launched from the deck using a trolley and would land on the water upon their return. The Fairey III floatplane could also be catapult-launched from a ship. The IIID had a wooden, fabric-covered fuselage and usually a wooden, two-blade, fixed-pitch propeller. One IIID was built with metal wings and floats. A total of 207 IIIDs were produced for the Fleet Air Arm and RAF (Royal Air Force), with a further 20 being built for export.

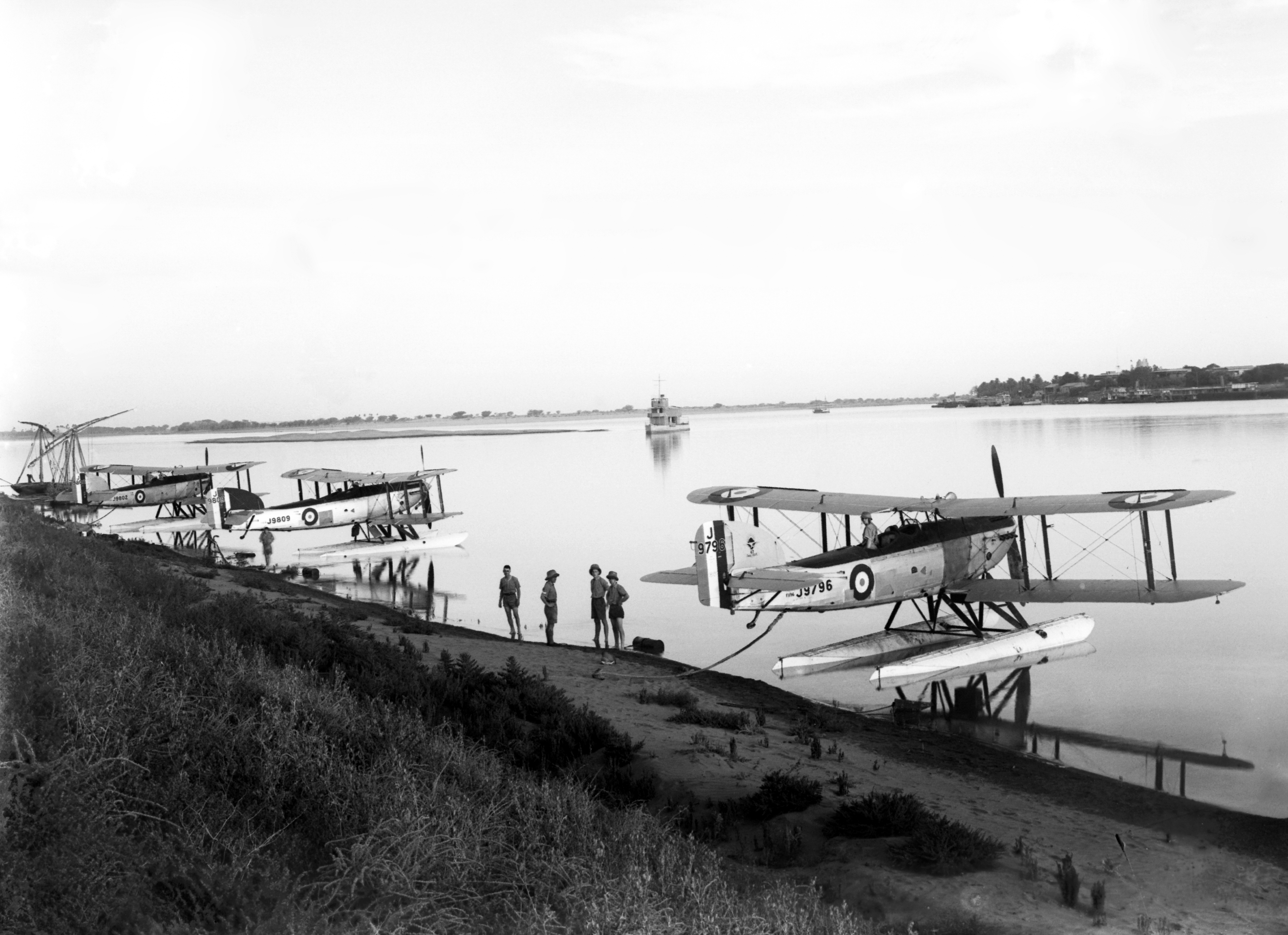
IIIF's of 47 Squadron on the Blue Nile at Khartoum in 1930

A Fairey III floatplane (G-EALQ) with a 450 hp Napier Lion was entered into the Air Ministry Commercial Amphibian Competition of September 1920.

The most prolific and enduring of the Fairey IIIs was the final model, the IIIF, which was designed to meet Air Ministry Specification 19/24 for a three-seat spotter/reconnaissance aircraft for the Fleet Air Arm and a two-seat general purpose aircraft for the Royal Air Force. The IIIF, which first flew on 20 April 1926, had a more streamlined engine installation and initially a fuselage of mixed metal and wooden construction, with wings similar to the IIID's, although later production aircraft were fitted with all-metal fuselages and wings.

Over 350 IIIFs were operated by the Fleet Air Arm, making it the most widely used type of aircraft in Fleet Air Arm service between the wars and also the second most produced British military aircraft of the inter-war years behind the Hawker Hart family.

Three IIIFs were modified as a radio-controlled gunnery trainer, known as the Fairey Queen. The Fairey IIIF was also the basis for development of the Gordon and Seal.

== Operational history ==
=== Early versions ===
The IIIA and IIIB saw limited service towards the end of the war, with some IIIBs being used for mine-spotting duty from the seaplane station at Westgate-on-Sea. The IIIC entered service in November 1918, but did not carry out any combat patrols owing to the Armistice ending hostilities with Germany. Seven IIICs were deployed to Arkhangelsk in 1919 by the seaplane tender HMS Pegasus in support of the North Russian Expeditionary Force. They were used to carry out bombing attacks against Bolshevik shipping and rail communications.

=== IIID ===
The IIID was operated by the Royal Air Force and Fleet Air Arm as well as the Naval Aviation of Portugal (11 aircraft) and the air forces of Australia.

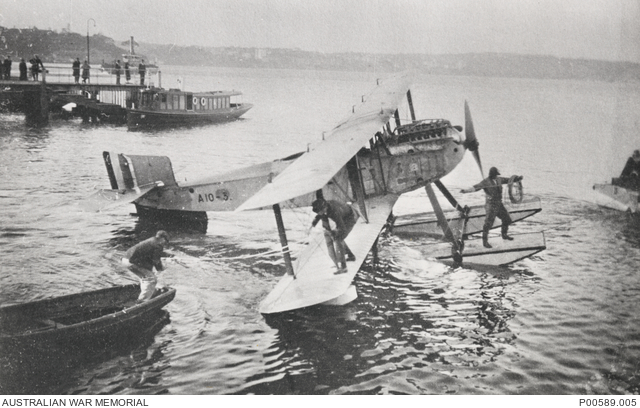
Fairey IIID floatplane during a circumnavigation of Australia in 1924

Australia received six IIIDs, the first being delivered in August 1921. In 1924, the third of the Australian IIIDs, designated ANA.3 (or Australian Naval Aircraft No. 3), flown by Stanley Goble (later Air Vice Marshal) and Ivor McIntyre was awarded the Britannia Trophy by the Royal Aero Club for circumnavigating Australia in 44 days. The IIID remained in Australian service until 1928.

Portugal ordered its first IIIDs in 1921. Its first aircraft, modified as the F.400 and named "Lusitânia", was used for an attempt to fly across the South Atlantic and demonstrate the new aerial navigation system devised by Gago Coutinho, the navigator. The voyage started on 30 March 1922 (Flyers Day in Portugal), stopping at Las Palmas, São Vicente, Cape Verde and achieving the main navigation goal of Saint Peter and Paul Rocks, where it was lost during refuelling. The journey was finished using another two standard aircraft (the second of which was immediately lost in the sea), completing the first aerial crossing of the South Atlantic, 72 days after their departure from Lisbon. The last aircraft, "Santa Cruz", is currently displayed at the Museu de Marinha, in Portugal.

The IIID entered Fleet Air Arm Service in 1924, operating from shore bases, aircraft carriers and floats until replaced by the IIIF in 1930. The RAF Cape Flight used four IIIDs to carry out a long distance formation flight from Cairo to Cape Town and back in 1926, the first long range formation flight by the RAF and the first RAF flight to South Africa. Fleet Air Arm IIIDs were used to defend British interests in Shanghai against rebel Chinese forces in 1927.

=== IIIF ===
Fairey IIIF of the New Zealand Permanent Air Force

The IIIF entered service with the RAF in Egypt and with Fleet Air Arm Catapult flights in 1927, and with the Royal New Zealand Air Force shortly after. The RAF used the IIIF to equip general-purpose squadrons in Egypt, Sudan, Aden and Jordan, where its ability to operate from both wheels and floats proved useful. The Westland Wapiti carried out similar roles in Iraq and India. The IIIF was used for colonial policing and for further long distance flights. The RAF replaced the Airco DH.9A with the IIIF in the home based Day-Bomber role, and, in the absence of sufficient long range flying boats, used them for maritime patrol duties by 202 Squadron from Hal Far Malta.

In the Fleet Air Arm, the IIIF replaced the IIID as a spotter-reconnaissance aircraft, operating on floats from the Royal Navy's cruisers and battleships, and with wheels, from the aircraft carriers HMS Furious, Eagle, Courageous, Glorious and Hermes.

The IIIF remained in front line service well into the 1930s, with the last front line RAF squadron, 202 Squadron, re-equipping with Supermarine Scapas in August 1935. The final front line Fleet Air Arm squadron, 822 Squadron retained the IIIF until 1936. The IIIF remained in use in second line roles, and despite being declared obsolete in 1940, some were still in use as target tugs as late as 1941.

=== Civil use ===
The first prototype III was purchased back by Fairey in 1919, fitted with new, single bay wings and a Napier Lion engine and entered into the 1919 Schneider Trophy race, on 10 September. The race was abandoned due to fog, however.

Four IIICs were civilianised, some with an extra cockpit between the two standard ones and sometimes with an enlarged rear cockpit. One carried five passengers, one in the extra cockpit and four in the rear. One three seat civilianised IIIC (G-EBDI) was part of a Daily News sponsored multi-aircraft round the world flight in 1922, with Norman Macmillan, W T Blake and cine-photographer G.H. Malins. The aircraft, with Macmillan and Malins aboard was finally lost between Lakhidia Char and Chittagong, but the crew were rescued.

A small number of civil operated IIIDs and IIIFs were used for survey duties in the 1920s and 30s, while in October 1934 a single IIIF was entered into the MacRobertson Air Race, reaching the finishing line in Melbourne but too late to be classed as completing the race.

== Variants ==
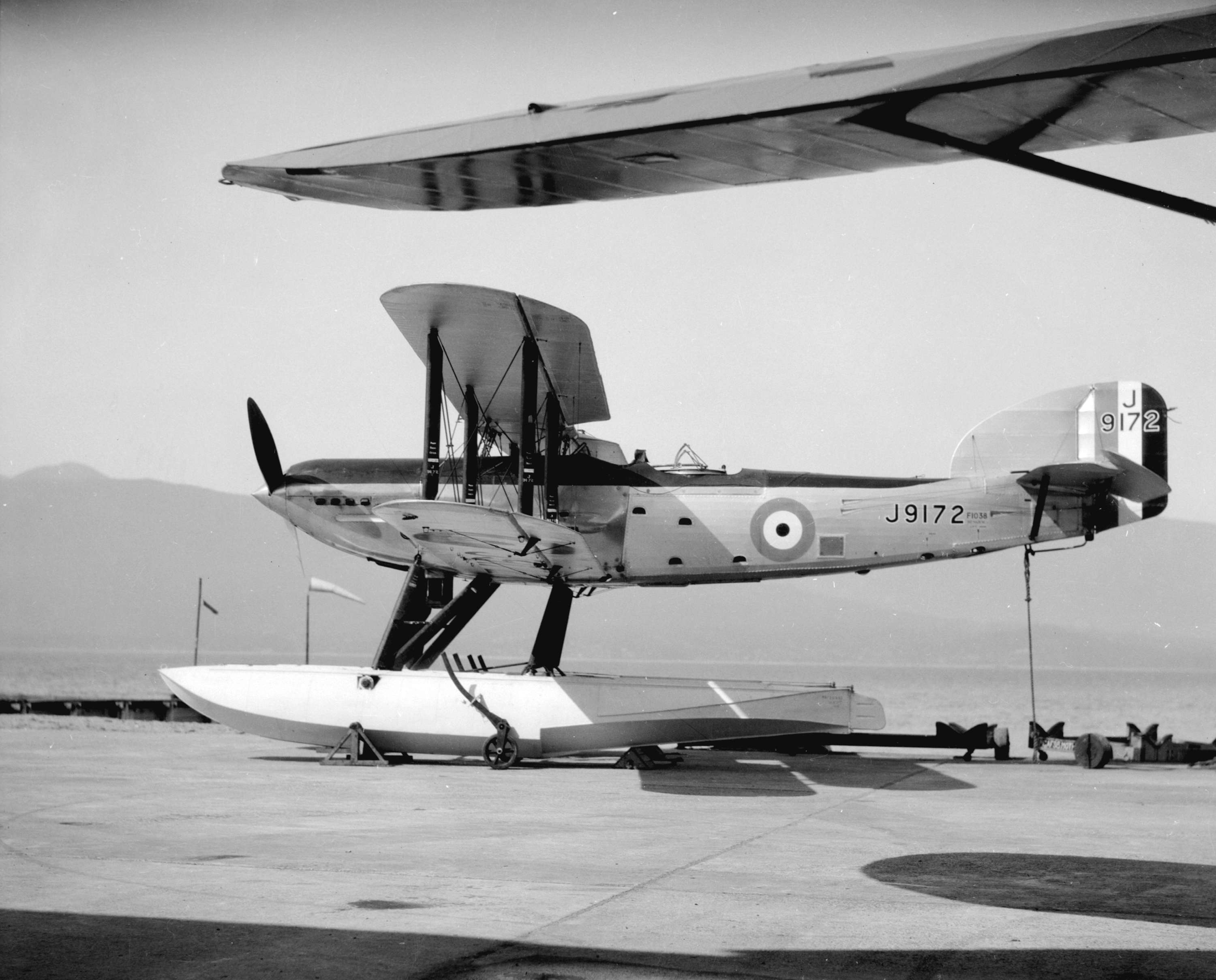
Fairey III F IV - single example used by RCAF for testing

Fairey N.10
The first Fairey III prototype.
Fairey IIIA
Two-seat reconnaissance biplane, powered by a 260 hp (190 kW) Sunbeam Maori II V-12 piston engine; 50 built.
Fairey IIIB
Three-seat patrol, bomber seaplane, powered by a Sunbeam Maori II V-12 piston engine, it had the same fuselage as the IIIA but the fin, wing and rudder had a larger area, it also had larger floats then the IIIA; 30 built.
Fairey IIIC
Two-seat reconnaissance, bomber and general-purpose seaplane, powered by a 375 hp (280 kW) Rolls-Royce Eagle V-12 piston engine; 36 built.
Fairey IIID
Two-seat general-purpose biplane, powered by a 375 hp (280 kW) Rolls-Royce Eagle V-12 or 450 hp (336 kW) Napier Lion W-12 piston engine; 227 built.
Fairey IIIE
Designation sometimes used for Fairey Ferret radial-engine reconnaissance and general purpose aircraft. Three built.
Fairey IIIF
Two-seat general-purpose biplane or three-seat spotter-reconnaissance biplane, powered by a Napier Lion W-12 piston engine.
Fairey IIIF Mk.I
First production version of the Fairey IIIF. Three-seat spotter-reconnaissance biplane, powered by a Napier Lion VA W-12 piston engine, of composite wood and metal construction. 55 built.
Fairey IIIF Mk.II
Three-seat spotter-reconnaissance biplane, powered by a Napier Lion XIA W-12 piston engine, of composite wood and metal construction; 33 built.
Fairey IIIF Mk.III
Three-seat spotter-reconnaissance biplane, powered by a Napier Lion XIA piston engine, with a fabric-covered all-metal structure; 291 built.
Fairey IIIF Mk.IV
Two-seat general purpose biplane for the RAF, in both composite construction and all-metal versions. Powered by a Napier Lion XIA W-12 piston engine; 243 built.
Fairey IIIF Mk.V
The original designation of the Gordon.
Fairey IIIF Mk.VI
Original designation of the Seal.
Queen IIIF
Radio-controlled gunnery training aircraft; Three built.
Fairey IIIM
Civil version; three built.
Fairey F.400
The first IIID (manufacturers serial number F.400) for the Portuguese Navy was delivered as a special long-range variant with an extended wing-span of 61 feet. It was also referred to as the Fairey Transatlantic and given the name Luzitania when it was used for an attempt to fly across the South Atlantic in 1922, stopping at Las Palmas, São Vicente, Cape Verde before being lost making a refuelling stop at the Saint Peter and Paul Rocks.

== Operators ==
Australia

- Royal Australian Air Force - IIID (Six originally ordered by the Royal Australian Navy but transferred to the newly formed air force)

Argentina

- Argentine Naval Aviation - Purchased six IIIF MkIIIM (Special) powered by 450 hp (336 kW) Lorraine Dietrich Ed12 engine in 1928. They entered service in 1929. The remaining aircraft were re-engined with Armstrong Siddeley Panthers in 1935, with the last aircraft being retired in 1942.

Canada

- Royal Canadian Air Force - One Fairey IIIC aircraft, one IIIF aircraft

Chile

- Chilean Air Force - IIIF
- Chilean Navy - IIIF

Egypt

- Egypt bought a single IIIF in 1939.

Greece

- Hellenic Air Force
- Hellenic Navy - IIIF

Ireland

- Irish Air Corps - purchased a single IIIF MkII in 1928, being destroyed in a crash in 1934.

Netherlands

- Netherlands Naval Aviation Service - IIID

New Zealand

- Royal New Zealand Air Force - New Zealand purchased two IIIF MkIIIMs in 1928, adding another in 1933, with one remaining in use in 1940.

Portugal

- Portuguese Air Force
- Portuguese Naval Aviation - IIID

Soviet Union

- Soviet Air Force - One Fairey IIIF aircraft, used for tests and trials.

Sweden

- Royal Swedish Navy - IIID

United Kingdom

- Royal Air Force - IIIA, IIIB, IIIC, IIIF
  - No. 8 Squadron RAF
  - No. 14 Squadron RAF
  - No. 22 Squadron RAF
  - No. 24 Squadron RAF
  - No. 35 Squadron RAF
  - No. 45 Squadron RAF
  - No. 47 Squadron RAF
  - No. 202 Squadron RAF
  - No. 203 Squadron RAF
  - No. 207 Squadron RAF
  - No. 219 Squadron RAF
  - No. 229 Squadron RAF
  - No. 230 Squadron RAF
  - No. 267 Squadron RAF
- Fleet Air Arm - IIID, IIIF
  - 820 Naval Air Squadron
  - 822 Naval Air Squadron
  - 823 Naval Air Squadron
  - 824 Naval Air Squadron
  - 825 Naval Air Squadron

== Surviving aircraft ==
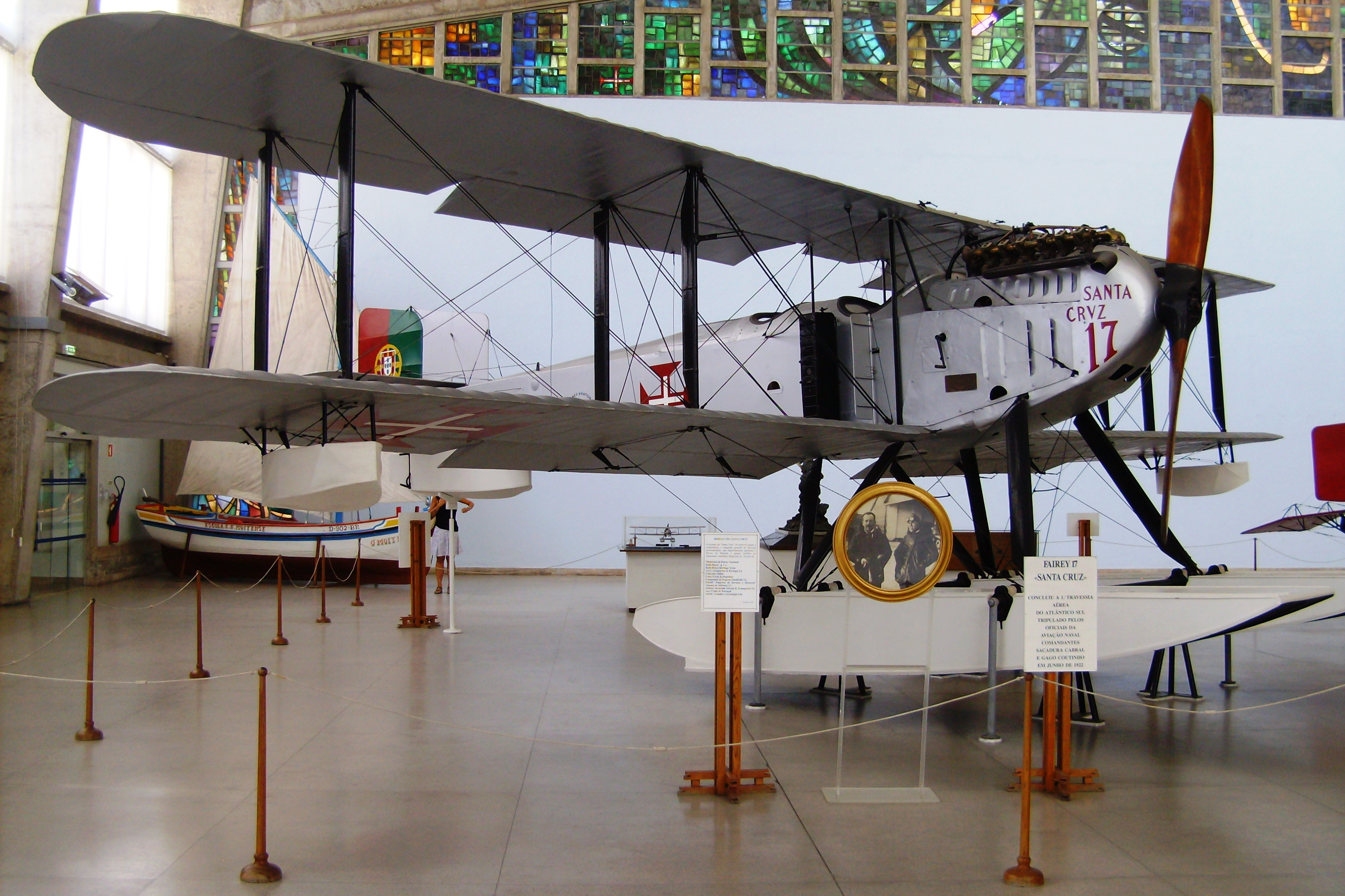
Fairey IIID preserved at the Portuguese Museu de Marinha

A single example of the Fairey III is preserved in Portugal's Museu de Marinha (Naval Museum). This is the aeroplane that finished the first aerial crossing of the South Atlantic. The British Fleet Air Arm Museum has a fuselage.

== Specifications (Fairey IIIF Mk.IV) ==
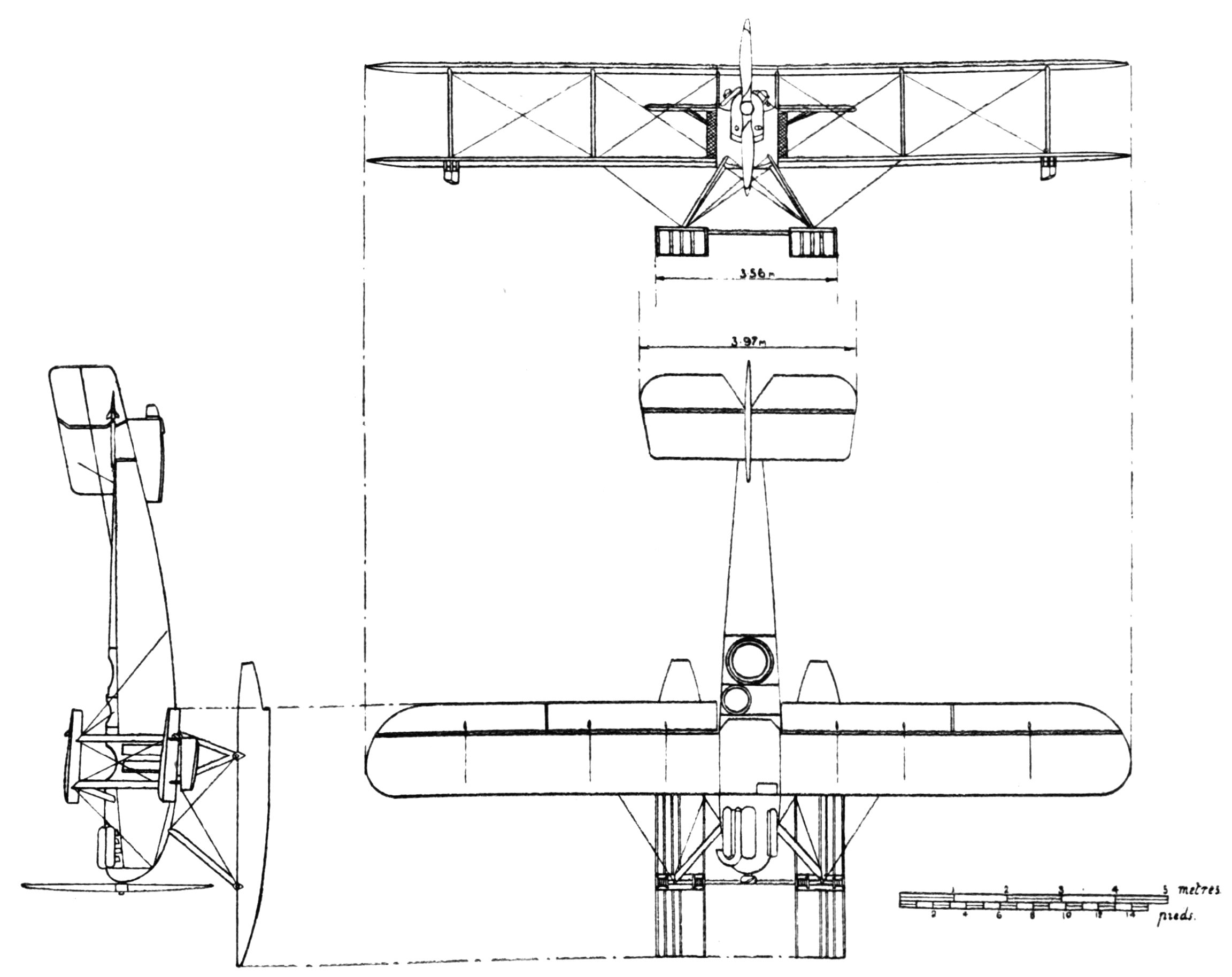
Fairey III 3-view drawing from L'Aéronautique May,1926

Data from Fairey Aircraft since 1915

General characteristics

- Crew: 2-3
- Length: 34 ft 4 in (10.46 m)
- Wingspan: 45 ft 9 in (13.94 m)
- Height: 12 ft 5 in (3.78 m)
- Wing area: 439 sq ft (40.8 m^{2})
- Empty weight: 3,855 lb (1,749 kg)
- Gross weight: 6,041 lb (2,740 kg)
- Powerplant: 1 × Napier Lion XI W-12 water-cooled piston engine, 570 hp (430 kW)
- Propellers: 2-bladed fixed-pitch propeller

Performance

- Maximum speed: 120 mph (190 km/h, 100 kn) at 10,000 ft (3,000 m)
- Range: 1,520 mi (2,450 km, 1,320 nmi) maximum fuel, no bombs
- Service ceiling: 20,000 ft (6,100 m)
- Rate of climb: 833 ft/min (4.23 m/s)
- Wing loading: 13.8 lb/sq ft (67 kg/m^{2})
- Power/mass: 0.094 hp/lb (0.155 kW/kg)

Armament

- Guns:

- 1 × forward firing .303 in (7.7 mm) Vickers machine gun
- 1 × .303 in (7.7 mm) Lewis Gun in flexible mount for observer

- Bombs:

- Up to 500 lb (227 kg) bombs can be carried under wings

== See also ==
Related development

- Fairey Gordon
- Fairey Seal
