= 822 Naval Air Squadron =

Inactive flying squadron of the Royal Navy's Fleet Air Arm

- Squadron badge
- Active: Royal Air Force: 1933–1939; Royal Navy: 1939; 1941–1946
- Disbanded: 19 February 1946
- Country: United Kingdom
- Branch: Royal Navy
- Type: Torpedo Bomber Reconnaissance squadron
- Role: Carrier-based: anti-submarine warfare (ASW); anti-surface warfare (ASuW)
- Part of: Fleet Air Arm
- Engagements: World War II
- Battle honours: North Africa 1942-43; Arctic 1943; East Indies 1944

Insignia
- Squadron Badge Description: White, an eagle displayed black armed and langued red crowned with the naval crown gold and holding in the dexter talon a winged thunderbolt white and in the sinister a grenade white both inflamed proper (1937)
- Identification Markings: 701-714 (IIIF); 901-921 (IIIF September 1935); 901-912 (Seal/Shark/Swordfish); U5A (Swordfish May 1939); single letters (Swordfish from October 1941); 4A+ (Albacore); single letters (Barracuda); single letters (Firefly)

Aircraft flown
- Bomber: Blackburn Shark; Fairey Swordfish; Fairey Albacore; Fairey Barracuda
- Fighter: Fairey Firefly
- Reconnaissance: Fairey IIIF; Fairey Seal

822 Naval Air Squadron (821 NAS), sometimes known as 822 Squadron, is an inactive Fleet Air Arm (FAA) naval air squadron of the United Kingdom’s Royal Navy (RN). It was active as part of the Royal Air Force (RAF) before World War II and part of the Royal Navy during it. It most recently operated with Fairey Firefly FR.1 fighter/reconnaissance aircraft between September 1945 and February 1946 and disbanded at RNAS Machrihanish (HMS Landrail).

The squadron, established in April 1933, was a carrier-based unit created through the merger of the Fairey III aircraft from 442 and 449 Flight (Fleet Torpedo Reconnaissance) Flights of the Royal Air Force RAF into the newly constituted Fleet Air Arm of the RAF. Throughout its tenure with the RAF, the squadron employed various aircraft, including the Fairey Seal, Blackburn Shark, and Fairey Swordfish. Following its transition to the Royal Navy, it subsequently operated Fairey Albacore during the Second World War, and later, it also utilised Fairey Barracuda.

== History ==
=== Pre-war (1933-1939) ===
822 Naval Air Squadron was established at RAF Netheravon, Wiltshire, on 3 April 1933 as a Torpedo Reconnaissance unit, originating from 442 (Fleet Torpedo Reconnaissance) Flight merged with 449 (Fleet Torpedo Reconnaissance) Flight.

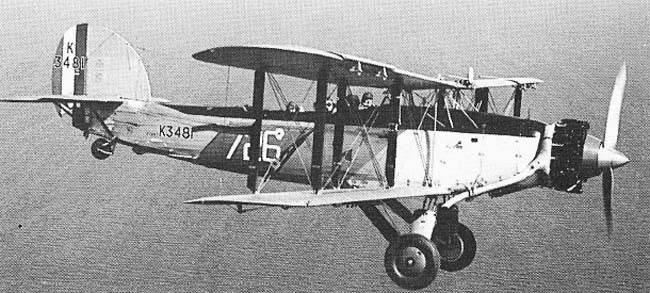
Fairey Seal; an example of the type used by 822 Squadron

It was posted to the Home Fleet aboard HMS Furious and from March to November 1936 it was equipped with Fairey Seals passed on from 821 Squadron, soon replaced by Blackburn Sharks, to carry out a Torpedo Spotter Reconnaissance role. These latter were flown at the Coronation Review Flypast at Spithead on 20 May 1937. In August 1937 the squadron received Fairey Swordfish aircraft, which it continued to operate from HMS Furious until February 1939, when the squadron was re-allocated to HMS Courageous as a deck landing training unit.

The squadron was taken over by the Admiralty on 24 May 1939, however, it disbanded on the same day at RNAS Donibristle (HMS Merlin), Fife, merging with 811 Squadron to form 767 Naval Air Squadron. The squadron was reconstituted from one of its flights, designated 822A, which subsequently transformed into the new 822 Squadron on 1 July 1939.

=== Second World War (1939-1945) ===
At the commencement of hostilities, the squadron was deploying its Fairey Swordfish aircraft from HMS Courageous, which was ultimately destroyed when it was torpedoed and sunk on 17 September 1939 and the squadron ceased to exist.

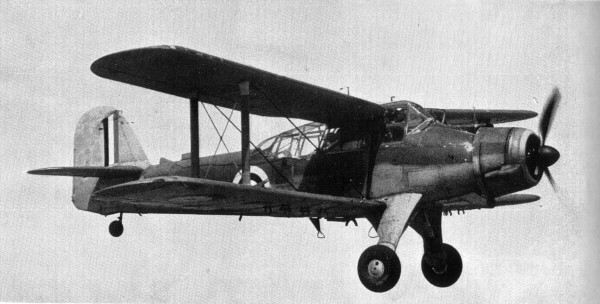
Fairey Albacore; an example of the type used by 822 Squadron

On 15 October 1941, 822 was reformed as a Torpedo Bomber Reconnaissance unit, equipped with nine Fairey Swordfish Is at RNAS Lee-on-Solent (HMS Daedalus), Hampshire. Although these aircraft were designated for the Avenger-class escort carrier HMS Biter, the squadron transitioned to nine Fairey Albacore torpedo bombers in March 1942 before her arrival from the USA. The Fairey Albacores were subsequently deployed on HMS Furious in July, where they participated in convoy escort operations.

In November, the squadron provided support for the North African landings and subsequently participated in a coordinated assault on La Senia Airfield on the 10 and 11, resulting in the destruction of forty-seven enemy aircraft. However, the squadron suffered the loss of four aircraft, including that of the commanding officer, Lieutenant J.G.A. McI. Nares. The remaining aircraft were disembarked in Gibraltar to compensate for the losses incurred, and in January 1943, anti-submarine operations were conducted off the coast of Algeria prior to rejoining HMS Furious in the Home Fleet for duty related to Arctic convoys.

The squadron underwent re-equipment with twelve Fairey Barracudas, a British torpedo and dive bomber aircraft, in July 1943 at RNAS Lee-on-Solent, subsequently integrating into the 45th Naval TBR Wing in October 1943. By April 1944, the squadron had reached St Thomas Mount, a Royal Air Force installation located in southern India, with personnel and aircraft making their journeys separately. In July 1944, the squadron incorporated 823 Squadron, increasing its total strength to 21 aircraft.

The squadron joined 11th Naval TBR Wing and embarked on HMS Victorious to conduct a dive-bombing assault on the rail center located at Sigli in northern Sumatra on 18 September. The subpar performance of the Barracudas in the tropical climate resulted in the squadron returning home the following month aboard the Ruler-class escort carrier HMS Rajah, devoid of its aircraft.

On 18 November 1944, the squadron regrouped at RNAS Lee-on-Solent, where it was outfitted with twelve Fairey Barracuda Mk IIIs. Subsequently, it began operations over the English Channel, operating under the authority of RAF Coastal Command, utilising RAF Thorney Island, West Sussex, and later RAF Manston, Kent.

In June 1945, the original aircraft were assigned to the Dutch-operated 860 Naval Air Squadron, while 822 was re-equipped with twelve Fairey Barracuda Mk II aircraft that were outfitted with ASH radar. The squadron was scheduled to join a Colossus-class aircraft carrier in August as part of the 18th Carrier Air Group, intended for deployment with the British Pacific Fleet; however, the occurrence of V-J Dayaltered these plans.

=== Firefly (1945-1946) ===
The squadron re-equipped in September with twelve Firefly FR.1s, while stationed at RNAS Woodvale (HMS Ringtail II), Merseyside. The Fairey Firefly was designed to the Naval Spec N.5/40 and it carried on the tradition, peculiar to the FAA, of the fast two-seater combining the fighter and reconnaissance roles. Production of the Firefly began and the first Mk I was delivered on 4 March 1943. FR Mk Is were the fighter/reconnaissance variant which were fitted with the ASH detection radar. Ultimately the squadron disbanded at RNAS Machrihanish (HMS Landrail), Argyll and Bute, on 19 February 1946.

== Aircraft operated ==
The squadron operated a variety of different aircraft and versions:

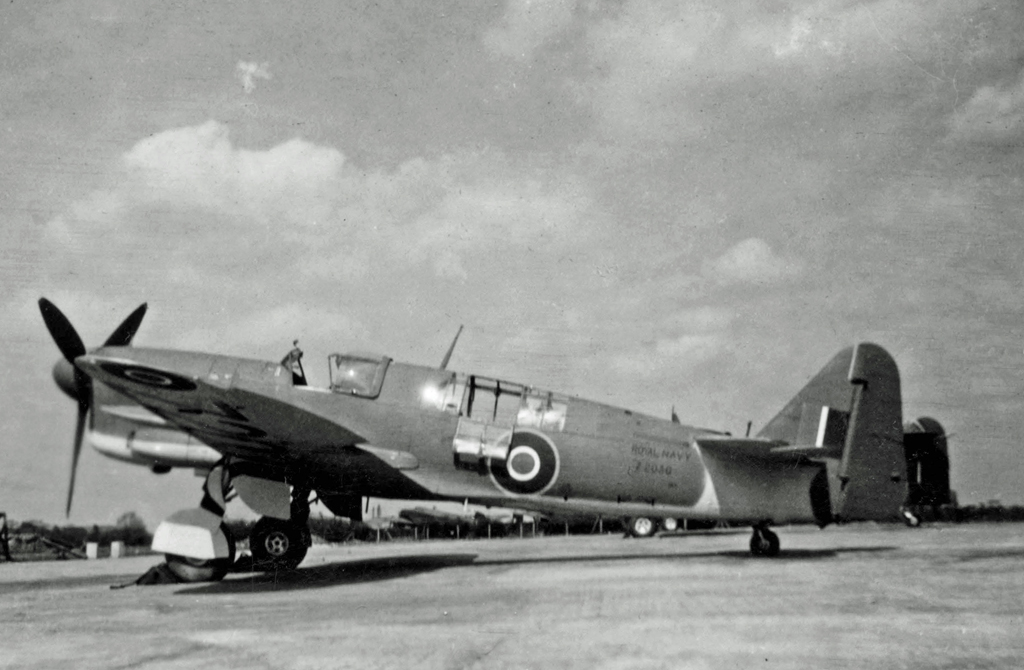
Fairey Firefly FR.1

- Fairey IIIF reconnaissance biplane (April 1933 - July 1936)
- Fairey Seal spotter-reconnaissance aircraft (June - November 1936)
- Blackburn Shark torpedo bomber Mk II (November 1936 - August 1937)
- Fairey Swordfish I torpedo bomber (August 1937 - September 1939)
- Fairey Swordfish II torpedo bomber (October 1941 - March 1942)
- Fairey Albacore torpedo bomber (April 1942 - August 1943)
- Fairey Barracuda Mk II torpedo and dive bomber (July 1943 - October 1944)
- Fairey Barracuda Mk III torpedo and dive bomber (January - June 1945)
- Fairey Barracuda Mk II (ASH) torpedo and dive bomber with radar (June - September 1945)
- Fairey Firefly FR.1 fighter/reconnaissance aircraft (September 1945 - February 1946)

== Battle honours ==
The following Battle Honours have been awarded to 822 Naval Air Squadron:

- North Africa 1942-43
- Arctic 1943
- East Indies 1944

== Assignments ==
822 Naval Air Squadron was assigned as needed to form part of a number of larger units:

- 45th Naval TBR Wing (25 October 1943 - 21 April 1944)
- 11th Naval TBR Wing (21 April 1944 - 6 July 1944)

== Commanding officers ==
List of commanding officers of 822 Naval Air Squadron:

1933 - 1939

- Lieutenant Commander H.L.StJ. Fancourt, RN, (Squadron Leader, RAF), from 6 May 1933 (Commander 31 December 1933)
- Lieutenant Commander E.O.F. Price, RN, (Flight Lieutenant, RAF), from 1 June 1934
- Lieutenant Commander E.B. Carnduff, RN, (Flight Lieutenant, RAF), from 21 June 1934
- Lieutenant Commander A.P. Colthurst, RN, (Squadron Leader, RAF), from 18 August 1934
- Lieutenant Commander A.M. Rundle, RN, (Squadron Leader, RAF), from 14 March 1936
- Lieutenant Commander J.B. Buckley, RN, (Squadron Leader, RAF), from 21 April 1938
- Lieutenant Commander K. Williamson, RN, (Squadron Leader, RAF), from 28 July 1938
- disbanded - 24 May 1939

1939

- Lieutenant Commander W.H.G. Saunt, RN, (Squadron Leader, RAF), from 15 May 1939
- Lieutenant Commander H.L. McCulloch, RN, from 1 June 1939
- Lieutenant Commander P.W. Humphreys, RN, from 1 July 1939
- disbanded - 17 September 1939

1941 - 1946

- Major A.R. Burch, DSC, RM, from 15 October 1941
- Lieutenant(A) J.G.A. McI. Nares, RN, from 6 August 1942 ( † 8 November 1942)
- Lieutenant H.A.L. Tibbetts, RCNVR, from 10 November 1942
- Lieutenant J.W. Collett, RN, from 10 February 1943
- Lieutenant Commander(A) P.F. King, RN, from 3 March 1943
- Lieutenant Commander B.E. Boulding, DSC, RN, from 10 August 1943
- Lieutenant(A) T.M. Bassett, RNVR, from 20 October 1943
- Lieutenant Commander(A) G.A. Woods, RNVR, from 1 December 1943
- Lieutenant Commander(A) L.C. Watson, DSC, RNVR, from 13 July 1944
- Lieutenant Commander(A) D.A. Davies, DSC, RNVR, from 4 April 1945
- Lieutenant Commander(A) J.M. Brown, DSC, RNVR, from 10 January 1946
- disbanded - 19 February 1946

Note: Abbreviation (A) signifies Air Branch of the RN or RNVR.
