= Ulundurpettai Airport =

Unused airport in Tamil Nadu, India

Ulundurpettai Airport is an unused airport near Ulundurpettai town. This airport was operated as an airbase by the British during World War II, who later it left unused and turned it into barren land, although the airstrip remains undamaged. This airstrip was last used during the opening ceremony of NLC India ltd, for which Prime Minister Jawaharlal Nehru attended, landing at this airstrip. Post that ceremony, the military rarely uses this strip for minor training purposes.

The Coast Guard of India tried to convert and use this airport, but this work was shelved for unknown reasons. There are also plans to convert this unused airstrip into a Drone port which is first of its kind in entire Nation and to convert it into a Drone training centre by Indian Military Forces. from December 2024, the Drone Port operations were started on a pilot basis by Anna University students with the permission from the Government of Tamil Nadu. there by it became the India's first operational Drone port

Now this airstrip has been taken by the government of India with plans to construct a new airport under the UDAN scheme which is also shelved due to infeasibility.
