= HMS Atheling =

Royal Navy Ruler-class escort carrier

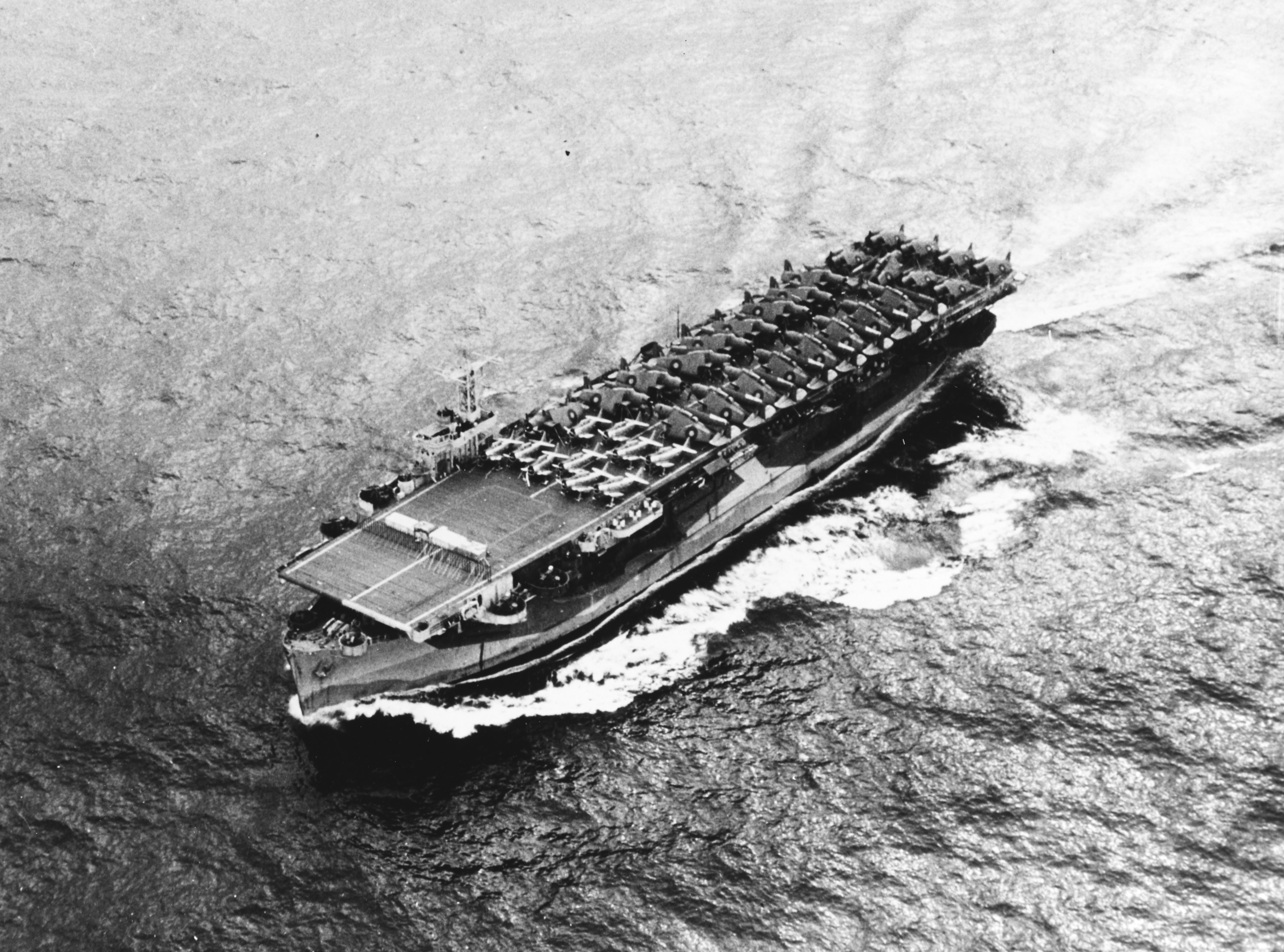
- HMS Atheling (D51) underway on 22 December 1943

History

United States
- Name: USS Glacier
- Builder: Seattle-Tacoma Shipbuilding Corporation
- Laid down: 9 June 1942
- Launched: 7 September 1942
- Commissioned: 13 July 1943
- Decommissioned: 31 July 1943
- Fate: Transferred to Royal Navy

United Kingdom
- Name: HMS Atheling
- Commissioned: 28 October 1943
- Decommissioned: 6 December 1946
- Stricken: 7 February 1947
- Identification: Pennant number:D51
- Fate: Returned to US 13 December 1946. Sold as merchant ship, scrapped 1967

General characteristics
- Class & type: Bogue-class escort carrier (USA); Ruler-class escort carrier (UK)
- Displacement: 7,800 tons (full load)
- Length: 495 ft 7 in (151.05 m)
- Beam: 69 ft 6 in (21.18 m)
- Draught: 26 ft 3 in (8.00 m)
- Propulsion: Steam turbines, 1 shaft, 8,500 shp (6.3 MW)
- Speed: 18 knots (33 km/h)
- Complement: 890 officers and men
- Armament: 2 × 5"/38 guns
- Aircraft carried: 18-24

HMS Atheling (D51) was a Ruler-class escort carrier, built in the United States, which was transferred to Britain's Royal Navy under Lend-Lease during the Second World War. She served almost entirely as an aircraft transport during the war, and per the terms of Lend-Lease, was returned to the United States at the end of hostilities.

== History ==
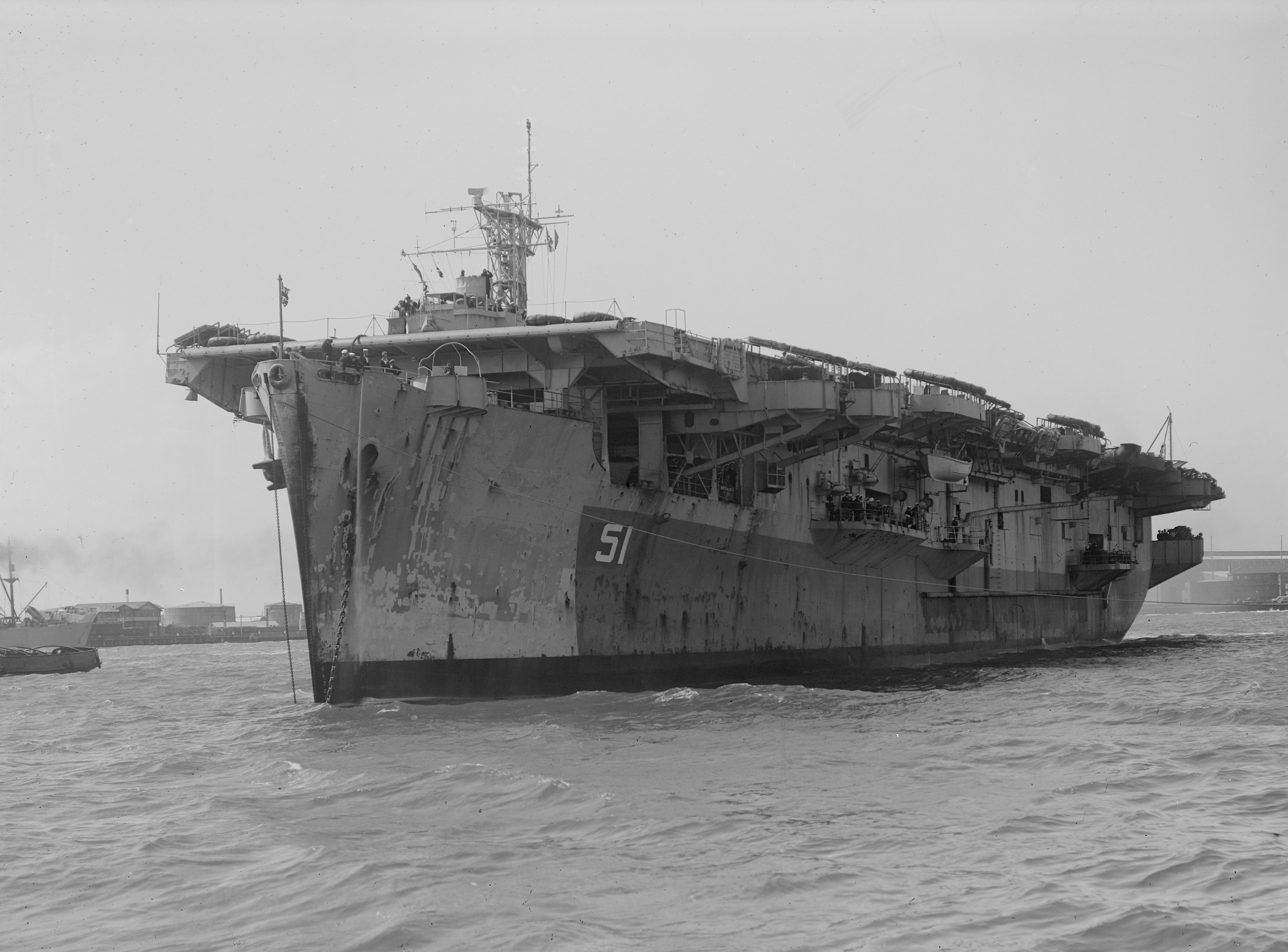
HMS Atheling in December 1945

Atheling was built under a United States Maritime Commission contract at the Seattle-Tacoma Shipbuilding Corporation's Tacoma, Washington yard. Sponsored by Mrys. Richard P. Luker, she was laid down (as MC Hull No. 244) on 2 June 1942; launched on 7 September 1942; towed across Puget Sound to the U.S. Navy Yard at Bremerton, Washington for completion; commissioned into the United States Navy as USS Glacier (ACV-33), under the command of Commander Ward C. Gilbert, on 12 July 1943; redesignated as CVE-33 two days later; sailed to Vancouver, British Columbia, toward the end of July; decommissioned as a U.S. Navy vessel and transferred into British hands on 31 July 1943; and, after further modifications were made, commissioned into the Royal Navy as HMS Atheling on 28 October 1943. She then sailed via the Panama Canal and New York to Scotland, arriving at Greenock in January 1944 and then undergoing still more modifications to allow her to operate fighter aircraft.

In February 1944 Atheling embarked four FAA squadrons as cargo and then, in March, joined a large convoy bound for India via Alexandria and the Suez Canal, disembarking the squadrons at multiple locations around the Indian Ocean. in May 1944 she was sent out on her only real attempt at a combat deployment. With an air group consisting of ten Supermarine Seafires of 889 NAS, and ten General Motors Wildcats of 890 NAS she was assigned to shadow HMS Illustrious in a sweep through the Indian Ocean, providing supplemental fighter cover and a "spare deck" to assist the larger ship. After only three days, however, the speed difference between the two vessels rendered the plan untenable, and Atheling was sent back to base. The fighter squadrons stayed.aboard til late July, but by the end of the month both were disembarked and disbanded.

In August the ship served in a training role; then, in September, she took aboard a flight of four Fairey Swordfish for "trade protection;" but ended up ferrying a full deckload of aircraft from Ceylon to South Africa instead, and as a result could not operate the Swordfish, which were soon sent ashore.

From November 1944 until the end of the war she continued on aircraft ferrying duties, mainly while on loan to the U.S. Navy. After the war she was used as a troopship before return to the US.Atheling put into Norfolk, Virginia, 6 December 1946 for return to the United States. Her name was stricken from the Naval Register 7 February 1947 and she was sold to National Bulk Carriers as the merchant ship Roma 26 November 1947. She was scrapped in Italy in November 1967.

From October 1945 to April 1946, her commanding officer was Capt. John Inglis, who was to become director of Naval Intelligence in July 1954.

== Design and description ==
The hulls of the Ruler class ships were based on the design of the United States Maritime Commission's Type C3-S-A1 or -A2 freighter. However, because they were earmarked for completion as aircraft carriers before they were laid down, it was possible to incorporate a number of modifications--most notably, increased internal subdivision--into their structures early on during construction. Atheling had an overall length of 492 feet 3 inches (150.0 m), a beam of 69 feet 6 inches (21.2 m) and a draught of 25 ft 6 in (7.8 m). Motive power was provided by two boilers feeding a steam turbine, which delivered 9,350 shaft horsepower (SHP) to a single propeller, propelling the ship at 16.5 knots (30.6 km/h; 19.0 mph).

The flight deck measured 450 by 80 feet (137.2 by 24.4 m). Beneath it was a hangar that measured 260 by 62 feet (73.2 by 19.2 m), with a 43 by 34 foot (13.1 by 10.4 m) lift at each end. Other air facilities included a small combined bridge–flight control island on the starboard side, far forward, outside the footprint of the hull and externally braced from beneath; one aircraft catapult; and nine arrestor wires. Armament included two American 5 inch/38 calibre Dual Purpose guns (which, unlike the guns in the preceding Attacker class, were not swapped out for British types upon delivery) in single mounts, sixteen 40 mm Bofors anti-aircraft guns in twin mounts, and twenty 20 mm Oerlikon anti-aircraft cannons in single mounts. The ship had a maximum capacity of twenty-four aircraft, which could be a mixture of Grumman/General Motors Wildcat, Vought Corsair, or Hawker Sea Hurricane fighter aircraft, and Fairey Swordfish or Grumman/General Motors Avenger torpedo bombers, serving in an anti-submarine role.
