= List of Boulton Paul Defiant operators =

This is a list of the Boulton Paul Defiant operators.

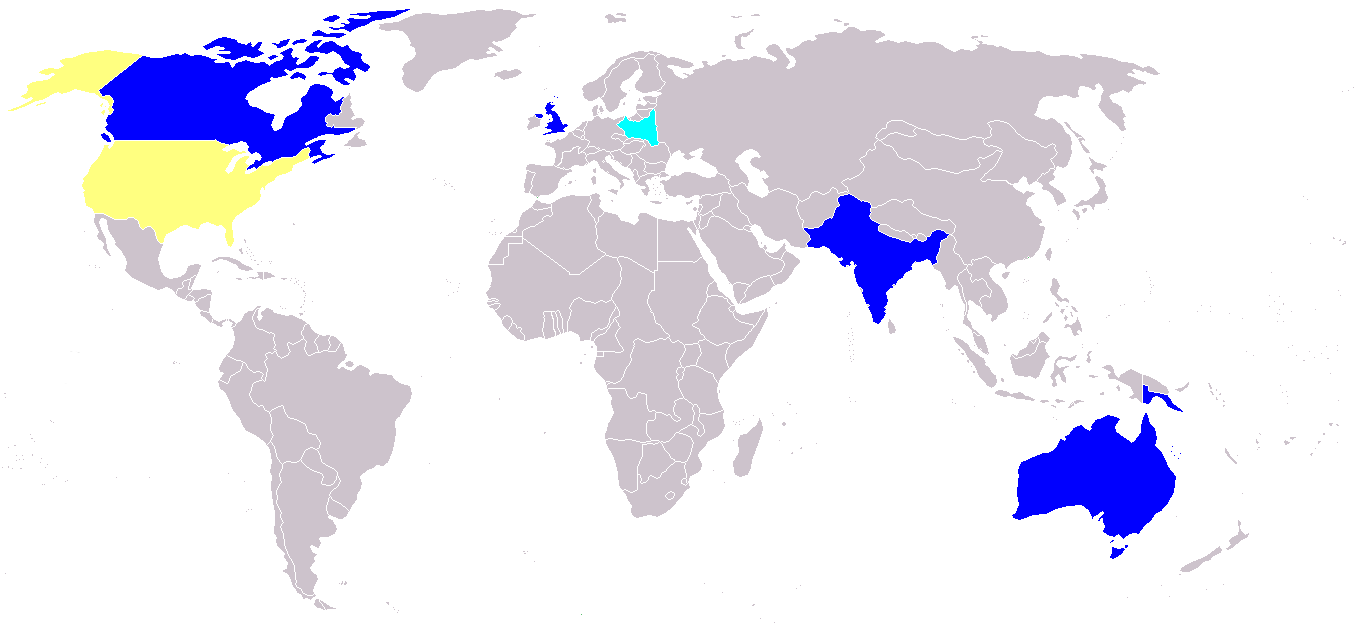
Operators of the Defiant, dark blue = operator, light blue = operator in exile, yellow = training use only.

== Operators ==
=== Australia ===
Royal Australian Air Force

- No. 456 Squadron RAAF used the Defiant between its formation in June 1941 and November 1941 when it converted to Beaufighters. Squadron code letters 'PZ'.

=== British India ===
Royal Indian Air Force

- No.1 Air Gunners School (India)
- No.22 Anti Aircraft Co-Operation Unit

=== Canada ===
Royal Canadian Air Force

- No. 409 (Nighthawk) Squadron used the Defiant on night fighter operations between July 1941 and October 1941, using the squadron code letters 'KP'.
- No. 410 (Cougar) Squadron used the Defiant as a nightfighter between June 1941 and June 1942, using the squadron code letters 'RA'.

=== Poland ===
Polish Air Forces on exile in Great Britain

- No. 307 Polish Night Fighter Squadron "Lwowskich Puchaczy" used the Defiant between September 1940 and August 1941, using the squadron code letters 'EW'. 307 was a new nightfighter Defiant squadron formed but did not become operational until December defending western Britain. One of their aircraft was serial number N1671, EW-D, and is the sole complete surviving Defiant which is on display at the Royal Air Force Museum London at Hendon.

=== United Kingdom ===
Royal Air Force

Squadron	Period	Operations
No. 2 Squadron RAF	August - November 1940	Fighter, Squadron code KO
No. 85 Squadron RAF	January - February 1941	Fighter, probably Squadron code 'VY'.
No. 96 Squadron RAF	March 1941 - July 1942	Fighter, Squadron code 'ZJ'.
No. 125 (Newfoundland) Squadron	June 1941 - April 1942	Night fighter, Squadron code 'VA',
No. 141 Squadron RAF	April 1940 - August 1941	Fighter, Squadron code 'TW',
No. 151 Squadron RAF	December 1940 - July 1942	Nightfighter as radar countermeasures, Squadron code 'DZ', .
No. 153 Squadron RAF	October 1941 - May 1942	fighter, Squadron code 'TB', .
No. 255 Squadron RAF	November 1940 - September 1941	Fighter, Squadron code 'YD',
No. 256 Squadron RAF	November 1940 - June 1942	Fighter, Squadron code 'JT', .
No. 264 Squadron RAF	December 1939 - July 1942	Fighter, Squadron code 'PS', .
No. 275 Squadron RAF	May 1942 - June 1943	air-sea rescue, Squadron code 'PV', .
No. 276 Squadron RAF	May 1942 - May 1943	Air-Sea Rescue, Squadron code 'AQ',
No. 277 Squadron RAF	May 1942 - May 1943	Air-Sea Rescue, Squadron code 'BA', .
No. 280 Squadron RAF	May - December 1942	Air-Sea Rescue, Squadron code 'MY', .
No. 281 Squadron RAF	April 1942 - July 1943	Air-Sea Rescue, Squadron code 'FA', FA-H
No. 285 Squadron RAF	March 1942 - January 1944	Anti-Aircraft Co-operation, Squadron code 'VG', .
No. 286 Squadron RAF	April 1942 - July 1944	Anti-Aircraft Co-operation, Squadron code 'NW'.
No. 287 Squadron RAF	April 1942 - October 1943	Anti-Aircraft Co-operation, Squadron code 'KZ'.
No. 288 Squadron RAF	May 1942 - April 1943	Anti-Aircraft Co-operation, Squadron code 'RP'.
No. 289 Squadron RAF	May 1942 - July 1943	Anti-Aircraft Co-operation, Squadron code 'YE'.
No. 515 Squadron RAF	June 1942 - December 1943	Radar Counter Measures (RCM) operations.
No. 567 Squadron RAF		
No. 667 Squadron RAF	December 1943 - February 1945	Anti-Aircraft Co-operation, Squadron code 'U4'.
No. 691 Squadron RAF	December 1943 - April 1945	Anti-Aircraft Co-operation, Squadron code '5S'

- No. 1422 Flight RAF
- No. 1479 (Anti-Aircraft Co-operation) Flight RAF
- No. 1480 (Anti-Aircraft Co-operation) Flight RAF
- No. 1481 Target Towing and Gunnery Flight RAF
- No. 1482 Target Towing and Gunnery Flight RAF
- No. 1483 (Bombing) Gunnery Flight RAF
- No. 1484 (Bombing) Gunnery Flight RAF
- No. 1485 (Bombing) Gunnery Flight RAF
- No. 1566 (Meteorological) Flight RAF
- No. 1600 (Anti-Aircraft Co-operation) Flight RAF
- No. 1602 (Anti-Aircraft Co-operation) Flight RAF
- No. 1616 (Anti-Aircraft Co-operation) Flight RAF
- No. 1622 (Anti-Aircraft Co-operation) Flight RAF
- No. 1623 (Anti-Aircraft Co-operation) Flight RAF
- No. 1624 (Anti-Aircraft Co-operation) Flight RAF
- No. 1631 (Anti-Aircraft Co-operation) Flight RAF
- No. 1692 (Radio Development) Flight RAF used the Defiant on Radar Counter Measures (RCM) operations

Fleet Air Arm

  - Operated the Defiant Target-Tug
- 721 Naval Air Squadron
- 726 Naval Air Squadron
- 727 Naval Air Squadron
- 728 Naval Air Squadron
- 770 Naval Air Squadron
- 771 Naval Air Squadron
- 772 Naval Air Squadron
- 774 Naval Air Squadron
- 775 Naval Air Squadron
- 776 Naval Air Squadron
- 777 Naval Air Squadron
- 779 Naval Air Squadron
- 788 Naval Air Squadron
- 789 Naval Air Squadron
- 791 Naval Air Squadron
- 792 Naval Air Squadron
- 794 Naval Air Squadron
- 797 Naval Air Squadron

=== United States ===
United States Army Air Forces

- No. 11 Combat Crew Replacement Centre USAAF - 1 aircraft
