= List of Bristol Beaufighter operators =

The following are operators of the Bristol Beaufighter:

== Military operators ==
=== Australia ===
Royal Australian Air Force

- European Theatre
  - No. 455 Squadron RAAF (maritime strike)
  - No. 456 Squadron RAAF (night fighter)
- Pacific Theatre
  - No. 22 Squadron RAAF
  - No. 30 Squadron RAAF
  - No. 31 Squadron RAAF
  - No. 92 Squadron RAAF
  - No. 93 Squadron RAAF

=== Canada ===
Royal Canadian Air Force

- No. 404 Squadron RCAF
- No. 406 Squadron RCAF
- No. 409 Squadron RCAF
- No. 410 Squadron RCAF

=== Dominican Republic ===
Fuerza Aérea Dominicana

- Escuadron de Caza-Bombardeo received 10 TF.X (rebuilt back to VIF standard) aircraft in 1948. Aircraft received numbers from 306 to 315 and were used until June 1954.

=== Israel ===
Israeli Air Force

- 103 Squadron operated 4 TF.X aircraft between July and November 1948.

=== New Zealand ===
New Zealand Squadrons of the Royal Air Force

- No. 488 (NZ) Squadron RAF
- No. 489 (NZ) Squadron RAF

=== Poland ===
Polish Air Forces (in exile in Great Britain)

- No. 307 Polish Night Fighter Squadron "Lwowskich Puchaczy"

=== Portugal ===
Portuguese Navy

- B Squadron of the Navy Air Forces operated 15 TF.X aircraft acquired by Portugal, delivered during March and April 1945. Next two aircraft were delivered in 1946 after overhaul by Bristol company. All aircraft were delivered from RAF stocks.

=== South Africa ===
South African Air Force

- No. 16 Squadron SAAF
- No. 19 Squadron SAAF (also known as RAF No. 227 Squadron)

=== Turkey ===
Turkish Air Force

- First Beaufighters TF.X (at least nine) were delivered in 1944 straight from frontline units. Another 23 TF.X aircraft were bought in 1946.

=== United Kingdom ===
Royal Air Force

- No. 5 Squadron RAF
- No. 17 Squadron RAF
- No. 20 Squadron RAF
- No. 22 Squadron RAF
- No. 25 Squadron RAF
- No. 27 Squadron RAF
- No. 29 Squadron RAF
- No. 30 Squadron RAF
- No. 34 Squadron RAF
- No. 39 Squadron RAF
- No. 42 Squadron RAF
- No. 45 Squadron RAF
- No. 46 Squadron RAF
- No. 47 Squadron RAF
- No. 48 Squadron RAF
- No. 68 Squadron RAF
- No. 69 Squadron RAF
- No. 84 Squadron RAF
- No. 89 Squadron RAF
- No. 96 Squadron RAF
- No. 108 Squadron RAF
- No. 125 Squadron RAF
- No. 141 Squadron RAF
- No. 143 Squadron RAF
- No. 144 Squadron RAF
- No. 153 Squadron RAF
- No. 169 Squadron RAF
- No. 173 Squadron RAF
- No. 176 Squadron RAF
- No. 177 Squadron RAF

- No. 211 Squadron RAF
- No. 216 Squadron RAF
- No. 217 Squadron RAF
- No. 219 Squadron RAF
- No. 227 Squadron RAF
- No. 234 Squadron RAF
- No. 235 Squadron RAF
- No. 236 Squadron RAF
- No. 239 Squadron RAF
- No. 248 Squadron RAF
- No. 252 Squadron RAF
- No. 254 Squadron RAF
- No. 255 Squadron RAF
- No. 256 Squadron RAF
- No. 272 Squadron RAF
- No. 285 Squadron RAF
- No. 287 Squadron RAF
- No. 288 Squadron RAF
- No. 307 Polish Night Fighter Squadron
- No. 515 Squadron RAF
- No. 527 Squadron RAF
- No. 577 Squadron RAF
- No. 598 Squadron RAF
- No. 600 Squadron RAF
- No. 603 Squadron RAF
- No. 604 Squadron RAF
- No. 618 Squadron RAF
- No. 680 Squadron RAF
- No. 684 Squadron RAF
- No. 695 Squadron RAF
- No. 1692 (Radio Development) Flight RAF

Royal Navy/Fleet Air Arm

- 721 Naval Air Squadron
- 726 Naval Air Squadron
- 728 Naval Air Squadron
- 733 Naval Air Squadron
- 736 Naval Air Squadron
- 762 Naval Air Squadron
- 770 Naval Air Squadron
- 772 Naval Air Squadron

- 775 Naval Air Squadron
- 779 Naval Air Squadron
- 781 Naval Air Squadron
- 788 Naval Air Squadron
- 789 Naval Air Squadron
- 797 Naval Air Squadron
- 798 Naval Air Squadron

=== United States ===
United States Army Air Forces

- 414th Night Fighter Squadron
- 415th Night Fighter Squadron
- 416th Night Fighter Squadron
- 417th Night Fighter Squadron

== See also ==
- Bristol Beaufighter
