= Colombo Racecourse =

Sports venue in Colombo, Sri Lanka

Colombo Racecourse Stadium
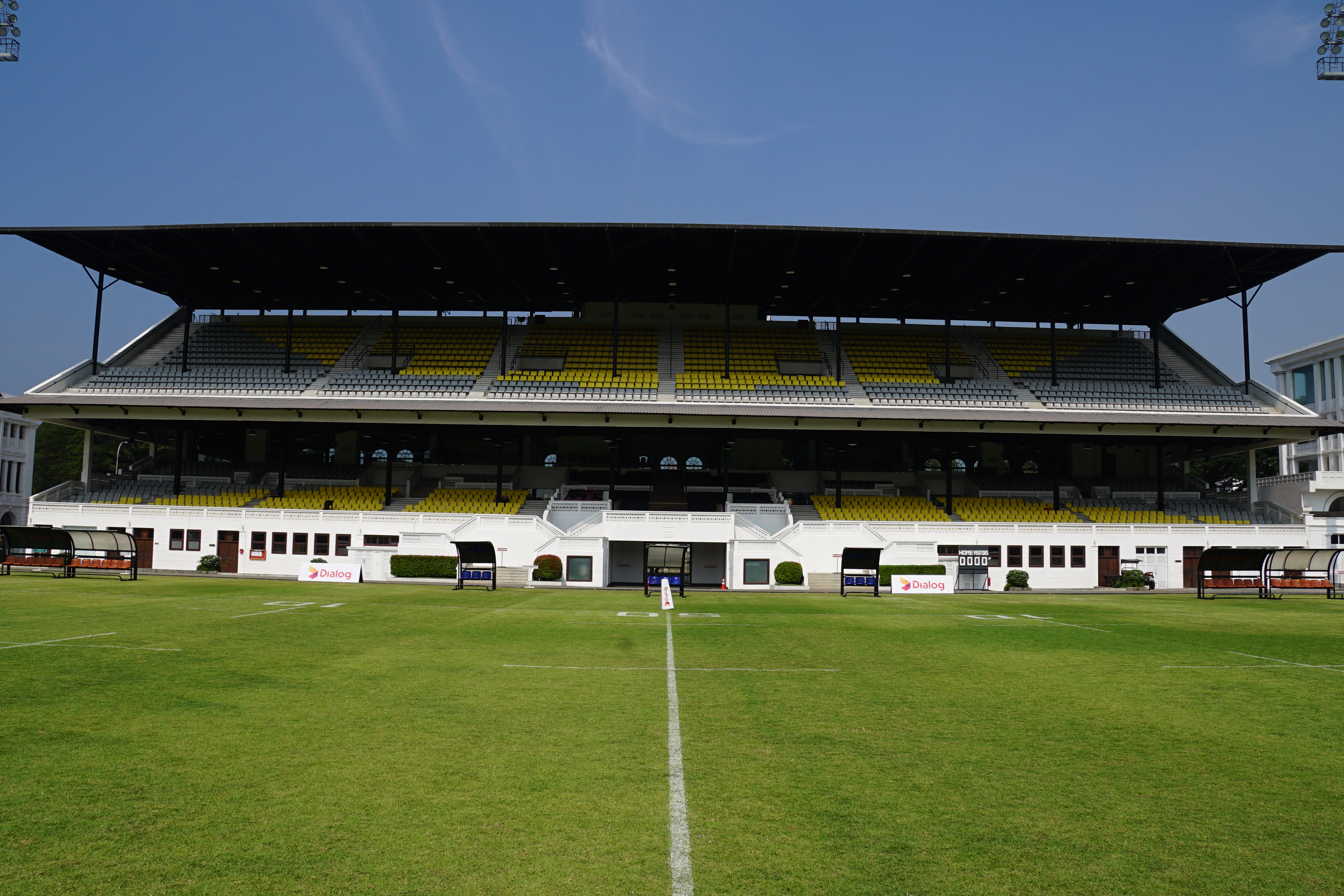

- Location in Colombo Location in Sri Lanka
- Location: Colombo, Sri Lanka
- Coordinates: 6°54′18.5″N 79°51′50.7″E
- Capacity: 10,000
- Surface: Desso GrassMaster

Construction
- Opened: 1893; 133 years ago

Tenants
- Colombo FC; SLRFU; FFSL

Colombo Racecourse (Sinhala: කොළඹ තුරඟ තරඟ පිටිය) is a historical harness racing course in the Cinnamon Gardens, Colombo. During the Second World War, it was used as a temporary airfield. In 2012, it was redeveloped as the Colombo Racecourse Sports Complex to become the first International Rugby Union ground in Sri Lanka to host all the national rugby union side's home matches.

In 2014, the ground went through a major renovation, which included the installation of floodlights and the conversion of a substantial part of the grandstand into a shopping and dining complex. The ground hosted the 2022 SAFF U-17 Championship.

== History ==
=== Horse racing ===
Officially opened for horse racing in 1893 after it was moved from the Colpitty Race Course, as one of the best in terms of design, facilities, and size in the East. In 1922 a totalisator was installed becoming the first race course in the East to have one.

The Colombo Turf Club was based here with its own pavilion and clubhouse next to the grandstand.

=== Airstrip ===
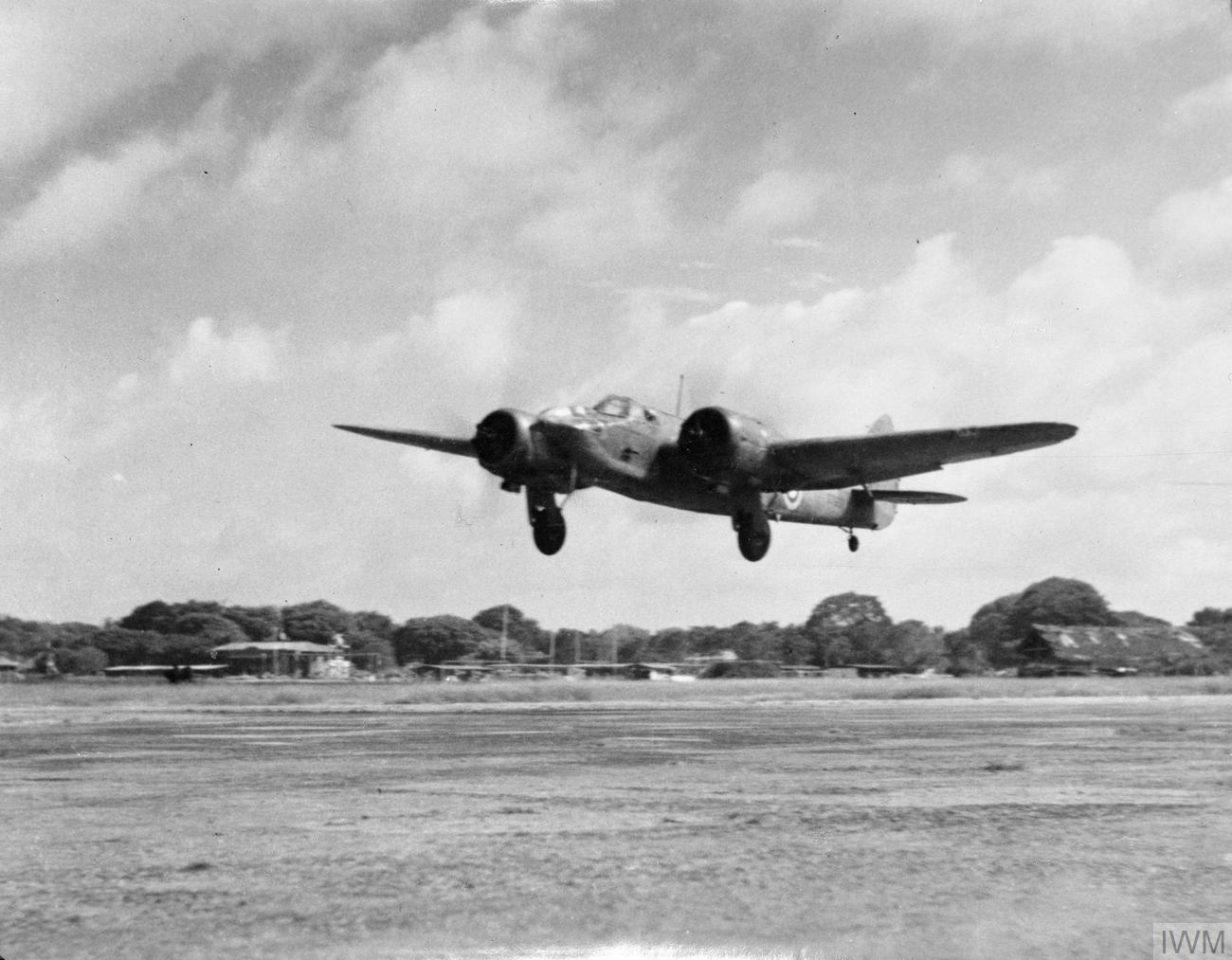
An RAF bomber takes off from Colombo's racecourse in Ceylon during the war.

In late 1941, World War II began in the East. After the fall of Singapore the Royal Navy's East Indies Station was moved to Colombo and then to Trincomalee. Admiral Sir Geoffrey Layton was appointed Commander-in-Chief, Ceylon with Air Vice Marshal John D'Albiac as air officer commanding, No. 222 Group RAF which was based in Ceylon. The order was given to construct an airfield at the Colombo Racecourse. D S Senanayake, Minister of Agriculture and Lands (later the 1st Prime Minister of Ceylon) was given the task of its construction. Consisting only of a single runway, station headquarters and the officers' mess were set up in the bungalows in Cinnamon Gardens and were serviced by a newly established military hospital in the premises of Royal College Colombo.

Two squadrons of the Royal Air Force (RAF) were based at the racecourse. They were No. 258 Squadron RAF with Hawker Hurricanes and No. 11 Squadron RAF with Bristol Blenheims. When the Easter Sunday Raid occurred the Japanese bombed the RAF units at RAF Ratmalana yet passed over the Racecourse Airstrip without knowing it existed. This allowed the Hurricanes of No. 11 Squadron to deploy and intercept the Japanese raiders.

=== Royal Navy ===
The Royal Navy (RN) also established a naval air station here during the Second World War. It was transferred from the RAF on 1 September 1943, then known as Royal Naval Air Station Colombo Racecourse, (or RNAS Colombo Racecourse) and then commissioned a month later as HMS Bherunda on 1 October, under the command of Captain A.F. Campbell, OBE, RN. 797 Fleet Requirements Unit and 742 Communications Squadron were stationed at the airbase, along with accommodation and training facilities for disembarked squadrons, including Fighter Direction training.

There were also a number of sub-units in Colombo including use of the local Rowlands Garage which was acquired for aero engine repairs and the fixing of aircraft wings, and became the Royal Naval Aircraft Repair Depot, Colombo. Additionally there was the Naval Aircraft Embarkation Unit, Colombo, the Royal Naval School of Malarial Control and Tropical Hygiene, and close by the Royal Naval Air Ceylonese Training Establishment Maharagama and the Royal Naval Air Motor Transport Depot, Nugegoda. The airbase 'paid off' on 30 November 1945.

==== Royal Navy Flying Units ====
List of first and second line squadrons, station flight and other flying units based at this location:

- 742 Naval Air Squadron
- 755 Naval Air Squadron
- 756 Naval Air Squadron
- 797 Naval Air Squadron
- 800 Naval Air Squadron
- 803 Naval Air Squadron
- 804 Naval Air Squadron
- 807 Naval Air Squadron
- 808 Naval Air Squadron
- 814 Naval Air Squadron
- 832 Naval Air Squadron
- 845 Naval Air Squadron
- 848 Naval Air Squadron
- 851 Naval Air Squadron
- 888 Naval Air Squadron
- 889 Naval Air Squadron
- 898 Naval Air Squadron
- 1830 Naval Air Squadron
- 1834 Naval Air Squadron
- 1836 Naval Air Squadron
- 1837 Naval Air Squadron
- 1838 Naval Air Squadron
- 1839 Naval Air Squadron
- 1841 Naval Air Squadron
- 1842 Naval Air Squadron
- 1843 Naval Air Squadron
- 1844 Naval Air Squadron

=== Decline ===
Following the end of the war the airfield was dismantled, racecourse was reconverted back to a horse racing track. This was greatly affected after gambling and betting were banned in the country in 1956. This resulted in horse racing stopping completely in Colombo thereafter along with Nuwara Eliya Racecourse (which re-opened in 1981).

The Colombo Racecourse, the Colombo Turf Club and its grounds were taken over by the government and its large land extent was segmented and distributed to government entities. Southern parts went to the University of Colombo, the northern portion to the Department of National Archives while others to the Royal College Sports Complex, Bloomfield Cricket and Athletic Club and sporting bodies.

The Grandstand and the Colombo Turf Club building were neglected and used for different purposes. The Sri Lanka Army used it as a temporary garrison from time to time as well as the Sri Lanka Air Force used what was left of racecourse grounds for landing transport helicopters.

=== Colombo Racecourse Sports Complex ===
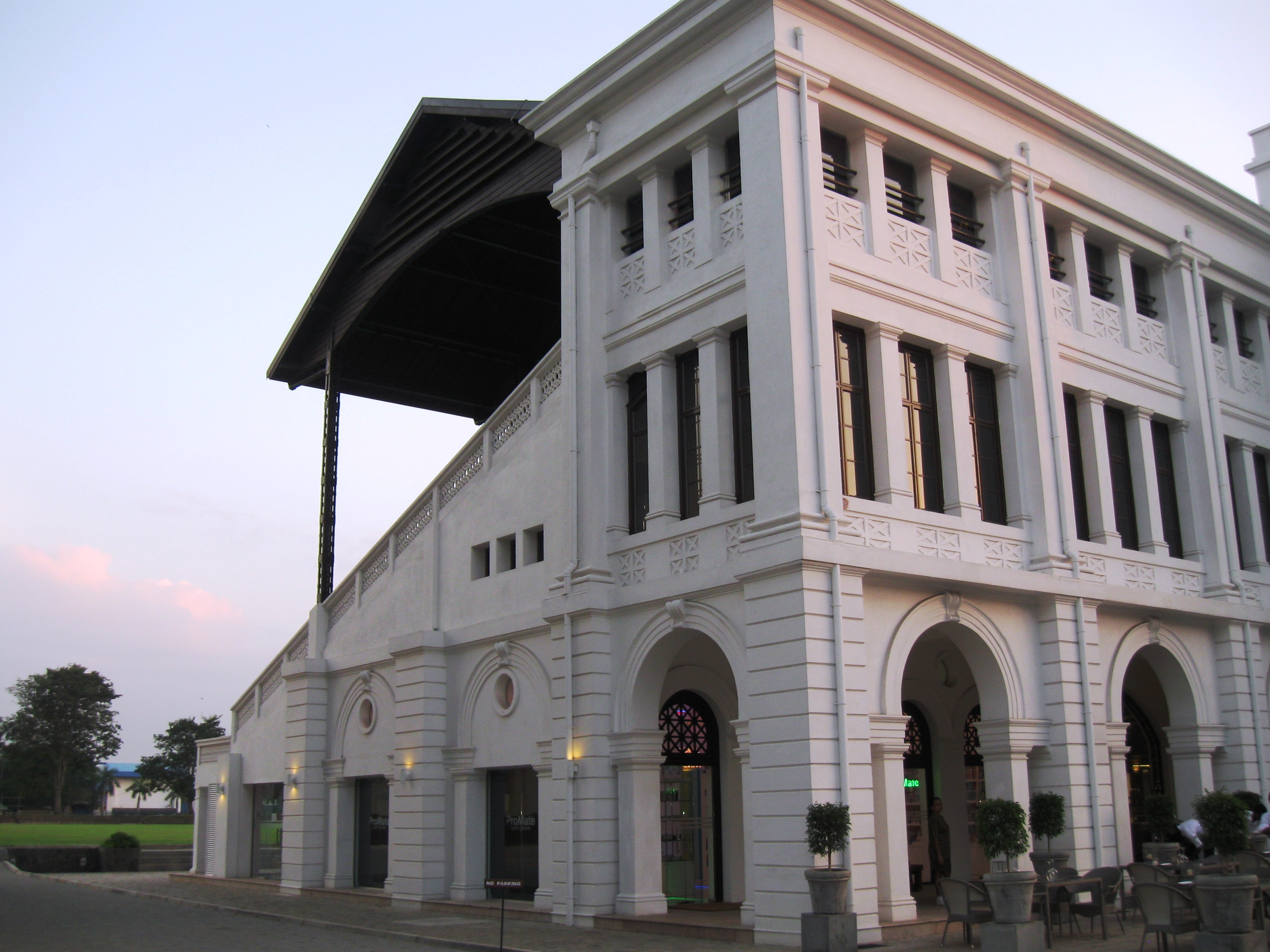
Colombo Racecourse

In 2011 the Urban Development Authority commenced the renovation of the Grand Stand and the Colombo Turf Club building. The structures were renovated by the 6th Engineer Services Regiment and Central Engineering Consultancy Bureau. The remaining grounds were redeveloped into Sri Lanka's first international-grade Rugby Union grounds.
