= EGAD =

EGAD may refer to:

- Embryonic GAD, the GAD25 and GAD44 forms of the enzyme glutamate decarboxylase.
- the ICAO code for Newtownards Airport in Northern Ireland.
