= 722 Naval Air Squadron =

Inactive flying squadron of the Royal Navy's Fleet Air Arm

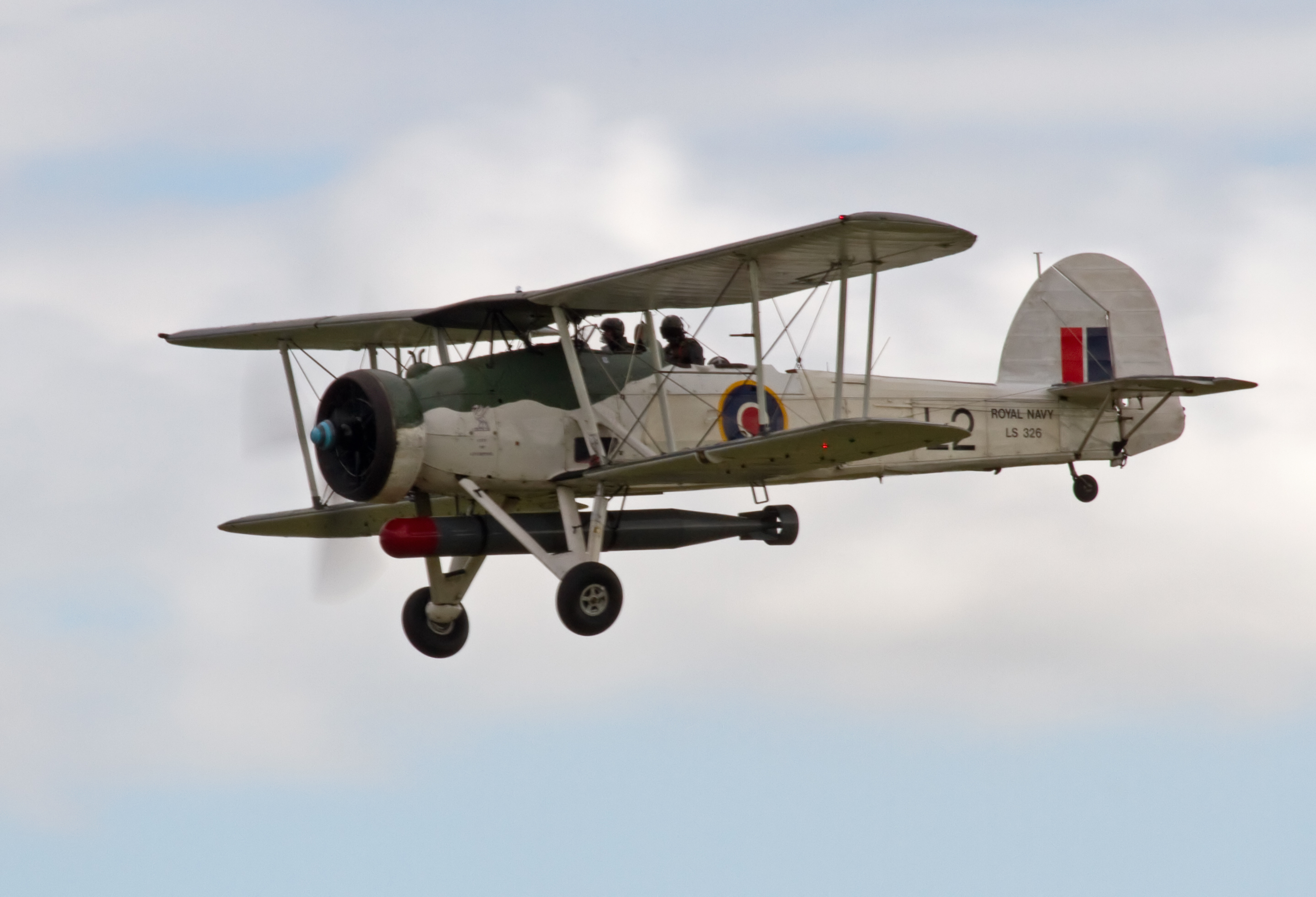
- A Fairey Swordfish similar to ones used by 722 NAS in 1945.
- Active: 1944–1945
- Disbanded: 24 October 1945
- Country: United Kingdom
- Branch: Royal Navy
- Type: Fleet Air Arm Second Line Squadron
- Role: Fleet Requirements Unit
- Size: Squadron
- Part of: Fleet Air Arm
- Home station: RNAS Tambaram

Commanders
- Notable commanders: Lieutenant Commander(A) A.F.E. Payen, RNVR; Lieutenant Commander(A) K.C. Johnson, SANF(V); Lieutenant Commander(A) L.G. Morris, RN

Insignia
- Identification Markings: T9A+

Aircraft flown
- Attack: Fairey Swordfish
- Fighter: Grumman Wildcat
- Patrol: Supermarine Walrus
- Trainer: Miles Martinet; Stinson Reliant

722 Naval Air Squadron (722 NAS), also called 722 Squadron, is an inactive Fleet Air Arm (FAA) naval air squadron of the United Kingdom’s Royal Navy (RN), created on 7 September 1944, as a Fleet Requirements Unit, where it was responsible for assisting in ship and aircraft gunnery practice. On 24 October 1945 the squadron disbanded following the end of the Second World War.

== History ==
=== Fleet Requirements Unit (1944–1945) ===
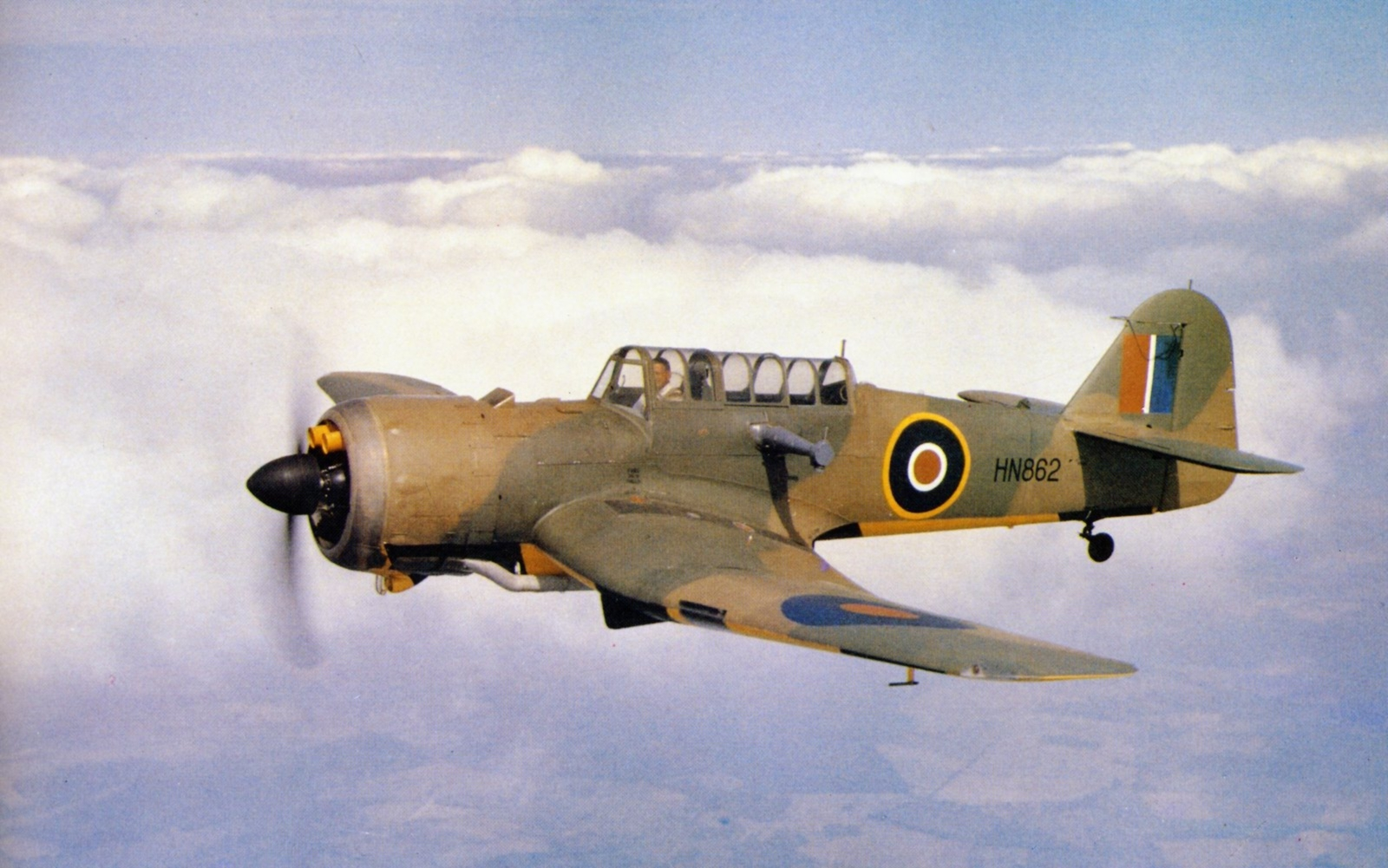
A Miles Martinet similar to ones used by 722 NAS in 1944 and 1945.

The squadron began its operational life in Southern India, with Lieutenant Commander(A) A.F.E. Payen RNVR in command at the squadron's HQ at RNAS Tambaram (HMS Valluru), Madras. Initially the squadron operated twelve Miles Martinet target tug aircraft, one Stinson Reliant, a liaison and training aircraft and one Supermarine Walrus, an amphibious maritime patrol aircraft. It towed target drogues for ships and naval air squadrons based in southern India.

On 7 September 1944 'X' flight was established at RN Air Section Juhu, the Admiralty had lodger facilities for an RN Fleet Requirements Unit at RAF Juhu, and was responsible for East coast duties, with a focus on the area around Bombay, it took over duties previously done by 797 Naval Air Squadron.

On 23 October 1944 Lieutenant Commander(A) K.C. Johnson SANF (V) took command of the squadron. Two months later, on 28 December 1944, 'Y' flight was established at RN Air Section Vizagapatam, the Admiralty having lodger facilities for an RN Fleet Requirements Unit at RAF Vizagapatam, Madras, and was responsible for West coast duties, the detachment consisted four Miles Martinet aircraft used for target towing operations.

Towards the end of the squadron's operational life, it received its third and final commanding officer, when Lieutenant Commander(A) L.G. Morris, RN, assumed command on 8 March 1945, and in the same month it received four Fairey Swordfish, a biplane torpedo bomber and later it also operated with a number of Grumman Wildcat fighter aircraft.

On 18 September 1945, 'X' Flight was moved to RN Air Section Cochin (HMS Kalugu), where lodger facilities from the RAF for an RN Air Section existed. On 24 October 1945 following the end of the Second World War, it was determined the squadron was no longer required and it was disbanded.

== Aircraft operated ==
The squadron operated a variety of different aircraft and versions:

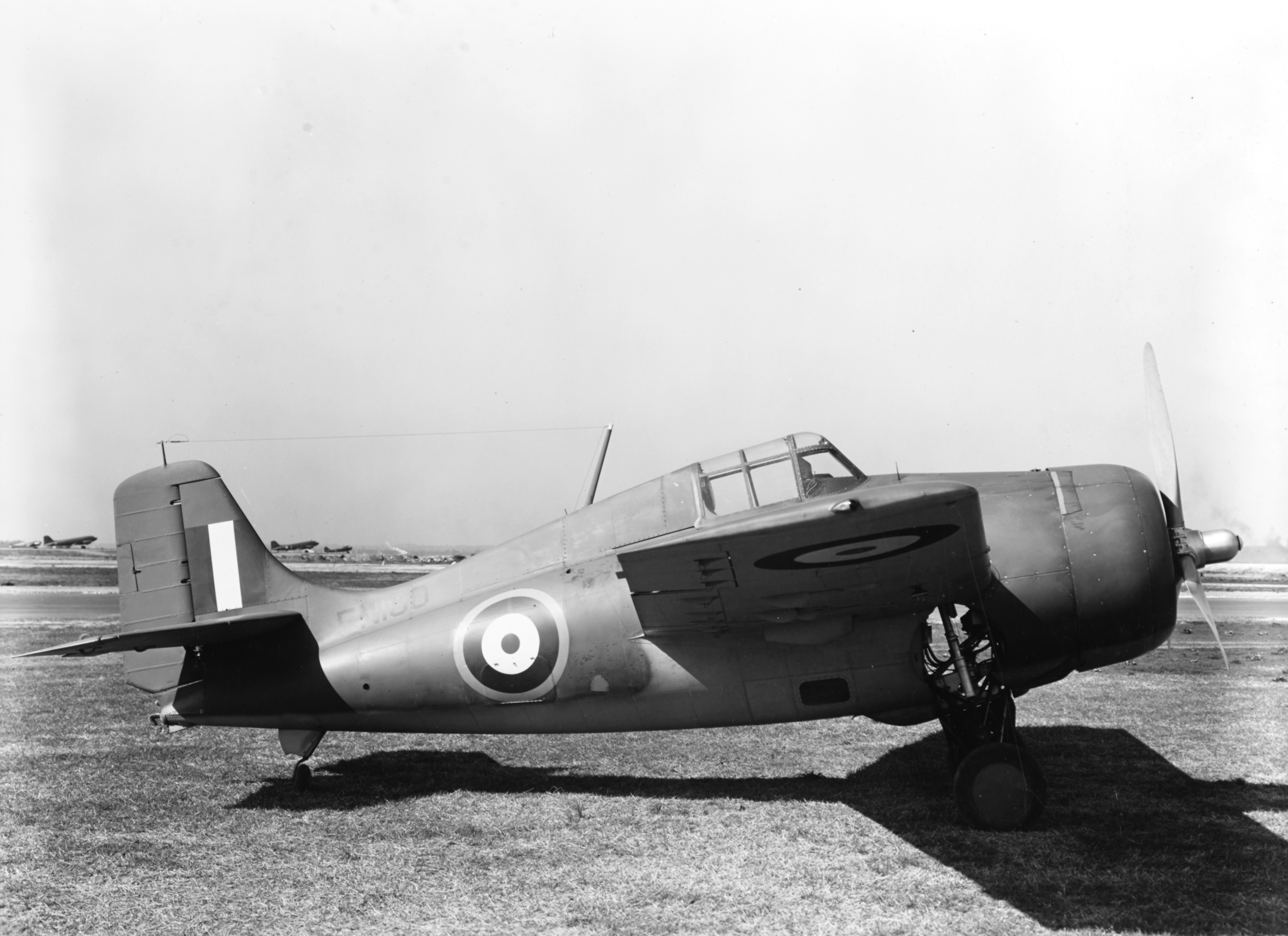
Grumman Martlet Mk IV (later Wildcat)

- Supermarine Walrus amphibious maritime patrol aircraft (September - October 1944)
- Miles Martinet TT.Mk I target tug (September 1944 - October 1945)
- Stinson Reliant liaison and training aircraft (September 1944 - October 1945)
- Fairey Swordfish training aircraft (May - October 1945)
- Grumman Wildcat Mk IV fighter aircraft (July - October 1945)

== Naval air stations ==
722 Naval Air Squadron operated from a number of naval air stations of the Royal Navy and Royal Air Force stations overseas in India:

- Royal Naval Air Station Tambaram (HMS Valluru), India, (1 September 1944 – 24 October 1945)
- disbanded - (24 October 1945)
  - 'X' Flight
    - RN Air Section Juhu, India, (7 September 1944 – 18 September 1945)
    - RN Air Section Cochin (HMS Kalugu), India, (18 September - 14 October 1945)
  - 'Y' Flight
    - RN Air Section Vizagapatam, India, (24 December 1944 – 14 November 1945)

== Commanding officers ==
List of commanding officers of 722 Naval Air Squadron with date of appointment:

- Lieutenant Commander(A) A.F.E. Payen, RNVR, from 1 September 1944
- Lieutenant Commander(A) K.C. Johnson, SANF(V) from 23 October 1944
- Lieutenant Commander(A) L.G. Morris, RN, from 8 March 1945
- disbanded - 24 October 1945

Note: Abbreviation (A) signifies Air Branch of the RN or RNVR.
