= 742 Naval Air Squadron =

Inactive flying squadron of the Royal Navy's Fleet Air Arm

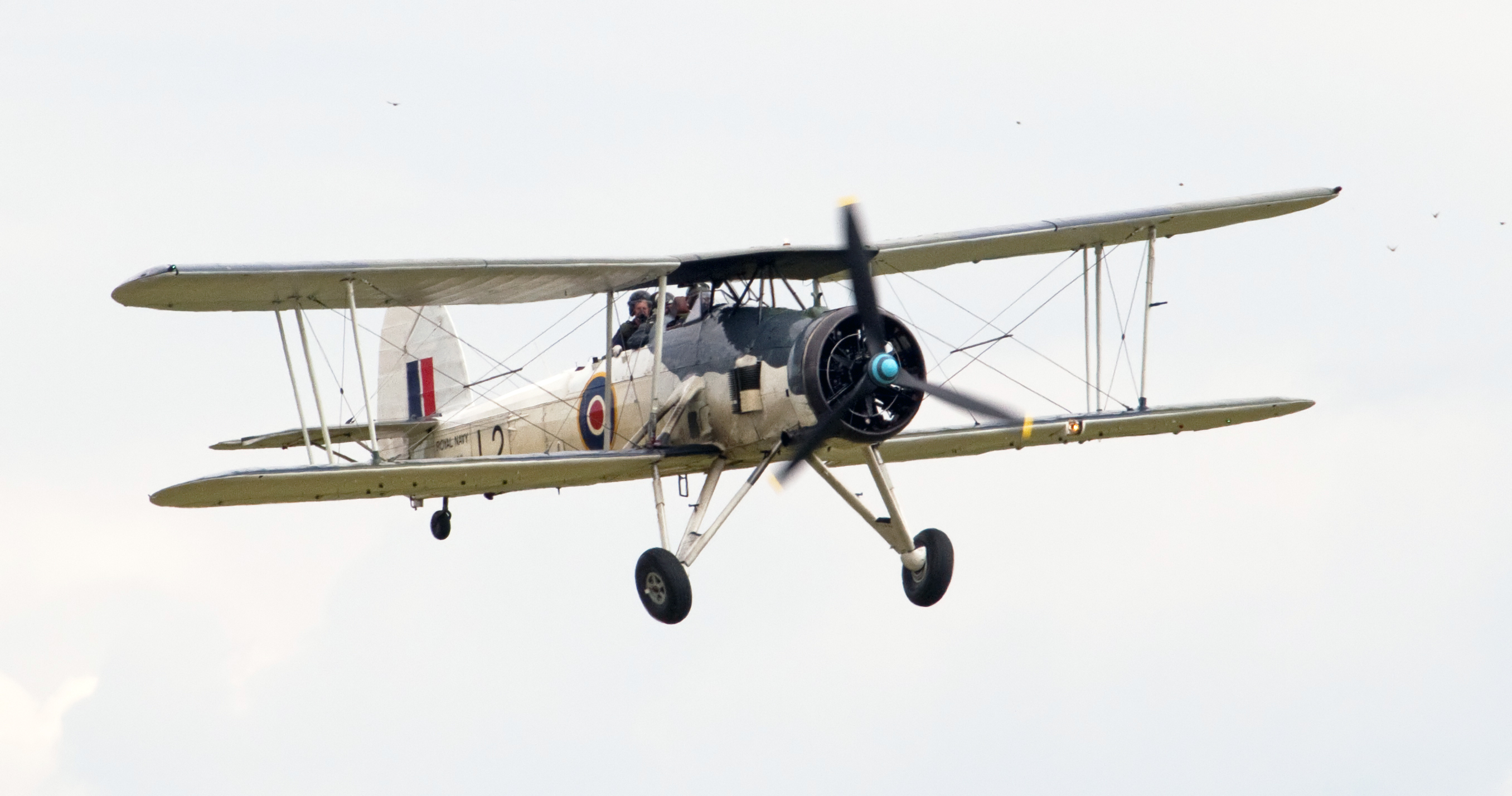
- Fairey Swordfish, an example of the type used by 742 NAS
- Active: 1943–1946
- Disbanded: 31 August 1946
- Country: United Kingdom
- Branch: Royal Navy
- Type: Fleet Air Arm Second Line Squadron
- Role: Communications Squadron; Air Transport Squadron
- Size: Squadron
- Part of: Fleet Air Arm
- Home station: See Naval air stations section for full list.

Commanders
- Notable commanders: Captain Thomas Neville Stack, CVO, AFC

Insignia
- Identification Markings: Uncoded

Aircraft flown
- Attack: Fairey Swordfish
- Patrol: Supermarine Sea Otter; Supermarine Walrus
- Trainer: Avro Anson; Stinson Reliant
- Transport: Beech Expediter II; Beech AT-7 Navigator

742 Naval Air Squadron (742 NAS) was a Fleet Air Arm (FAA) naval air squadron of the United Kingdom's Royal Navy (RN) which disbanded during August 1946. It was active initially from the end of 1943 as a Communications Squadron operating in Sri Lanka and India. It later became a Royal Navy Air Transport Squadron, covering the same geography.

== History ==
=== Communications Squadron (1943–1945) ===
742 Naval Air Squadron formed on 6 December 1943, at RNAS Colombo Racecourse (HMS Bherunda), located in Cinnamon Gardens, Colombo, Ceylon, as a Communications Squadron. it was effectively made up from the Communication Flight of 797 Naval Air Squadron. It was initially equipped mainly with Beech Expeditor, the military version of the Beechcraft Model 18, used as a trainer, transport and utility aircraft, building up to a strength of more than 20 aircraft. It was tasked with providing regular airline type services RN Air Stations in the Far East which included four return trips each day to nearby RNAS Trincomalee (HMS Bambara). Other daily services were operated between RNAS Colombo Racecourse and Madras; RNAS Colombo Racecourse and RNAS Sullur (HMS Vairi) for Coimbatore; RNAS Sullur and R.N. Air Section Cochin (HMS Kalugu); and RNAS Sullur and Madras via Bangalore.

The squadron operated out of RNAS Colombo Racecourse for the next nine months before moving to the RN Aircraft Repair Yard at Royal Naval Air Station Coimbatore (HMS Garuda), in Southern India, on the 15 September 1944. It was equipped primarily with Beech Expeditor C.II and Beech AT.7 Navigator aircraft, however, it also operated a small number of Avro Anson, a British multi-role training aircraft, Stinson Reliant, an American liaison and training aircraft, Supermarine Sea Otter, an amphibious maritime patrol aircraft, Fairey Swordfish, a torpedo bomber and Supermarine Walrus, an amphibious maritime patrol aircraft.

=== Air Transport Squadron (1945–1946) ===
Just after the squadron had moved to RNAS Coimbatore it became the RN Air Transport Squadron in November 1944 and included a detachment at Royal Naval Aircraft Maintenance Yard Tambaran (HMS Valluru), Madras, Southern India. Another move was completed during February 1945 when it moved to RNAS Sullur (HMS Vairi), near Coimbatore, Southern India, on the 1st of the month. with detachments operating from RNAS Colombo Racecourse, in Ceylon, RNAE Ratmalana (HMS Seruwa), Ceylon and RNAS Katukurunda (HMS Ukussa), Ceylon. 'Round Robin' communication flights by the squadron regularly called at Ratmalana.

Following the Japanese surrender in Singapore three aircraft flew to RNAS Sembawang (HMS Nabrock) in Singapore via Malaya, Siam and Burma and flew flights for the Flag Officer, Malaya and Forward Areas. In January 1946 nine Beech Expediter began a 6,500 miles (10,461 km) flight from RNAS Sullur (HMS Vairi) to RNAS Lee-on-Solent (HMS Daedalus), Hampshire, England, in formation and another nine aircraft were transported by sea, with a small number remaining in Ceylon and India. The squadron moved to RNAS Katukurunda (HMS Ukussa) on 26 February. In August the remaining aircraft were transferred to 733 Naval Air Squadron and 742 Naval Air Squadron disbanded in August 1946, having flown millions of miles with only one fatal accident.

== Aircraft flown ==
The squadron has flown a number of different aircraft types, including:

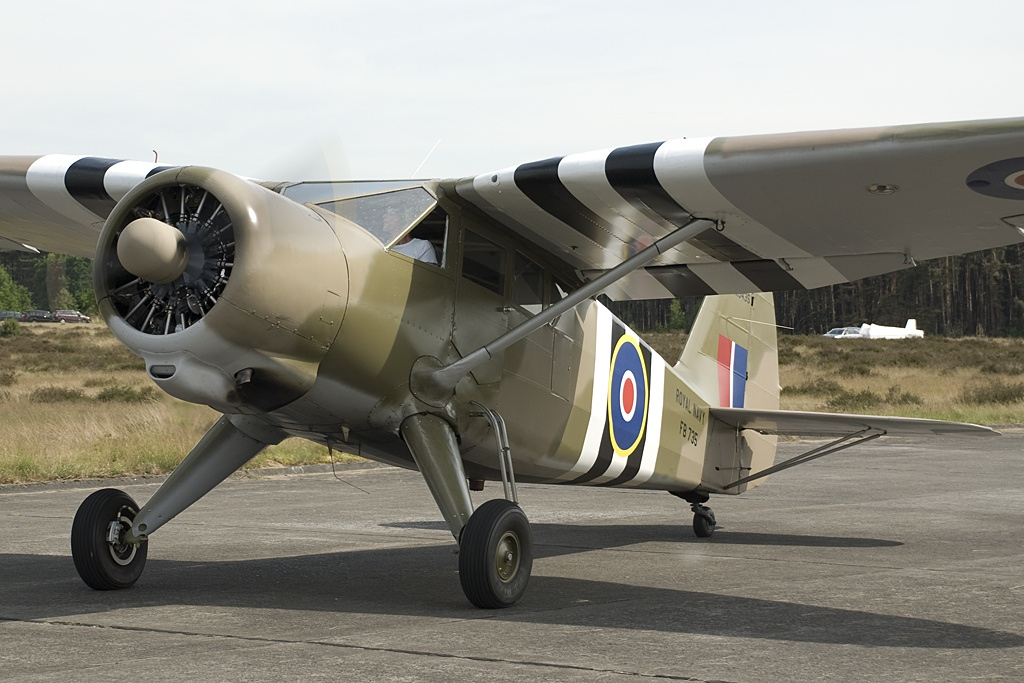
Stinson Reliant

- Beech AT-7 Navigator trainer, transport and utility aircraft (December 1943 - August 1946)
- Stinson Reliant liaison and training aircraft (December 1943 - October 1945)
- Fairey Swordfish torpedo bomber (December 1943 - October 1945)
- Avro Anson Mk I multi-role training aircraft (1944 - 1945)
- Supermarine Sea Otter amphibious maritime patrol aircraft (1944 - 1945)
- Supermarine Walrus amphibious maritime patrol aircraft (1944 - 1945)
- Beech Expediter II trainer, transport and utility aircraft (June 1944 - August 1946)

== Naval air stations and other airbases ==
742 Naval Air Squadron operated from a number of naval air stations of the Royal Navy overseas:

- Royal Naval Air Station Colombo Racecourse (HMS Bherunda), Ceylon, (6 December 1943 - 15 September 1944)
- Royal Naval Aircraft Repair Yard Coimbatore (HMS Garuda), India, (15 September 1944 - 1 February 1945)
  - Royal Naval Aircraft Maintenance Yard Tambaran (HMS Valluru), India, (Detachment from 21 September 1944)
  - Royal Naval Air Station Katukurunda (HMS Ukussa), Ceylon, (Detachment 14 January 1945 - 26 February 1946)
- Royal Naval Air Station Sullur (HMS Vairi), India, (1 February 1945 - 26 February 1946)
  - Royal Naval Air Station Sembawang (HMS Nabrock/HMS Simbang), Singapore, ('D' Flight from August 1945)
  - Royal Naval Air Station Colombo Racecourse (HMS Bherunda), Ceylon, (Detachment 2–31 October 1945)
  - Royal Naval Air Establishment Ratmalana (HMS Seruwa), Ceylon, (Detachment 1 November - 1 December 1945)
- Royal Naval Air Station Katukurunda (HMS Ukussa), Ceylon, (26 February 1946 - 31 August 1946)
- disbanded - (31 August 1946)

== Commanding officers ==
List of commanding officers of 742 Naval Air Squadron with date of appointment:

- Lieutenant(A) T.N. Stack, AFC, RNR, from 6 December 1943
- Lieutenant Commander(A) R. MacDermott, RNVR, from 8 January 1944
- Lieutenant Commander(A) E.W.C. Miller, RNVR, from 9 October 1944
- Lieutenant Commander(A) T.N. Stack, AFC, RNR, from 17 March 1945
- Lieutenant Commander(A) P.H. Parsons, RN, from 15 January 1946
- disbanded - 31 August 1946

Note: Abbreviation (A) signifies Air Branch of the RN or RNVR.
