= Miles Martinet =

Britiah target tug aircraft

M.25 Martinet
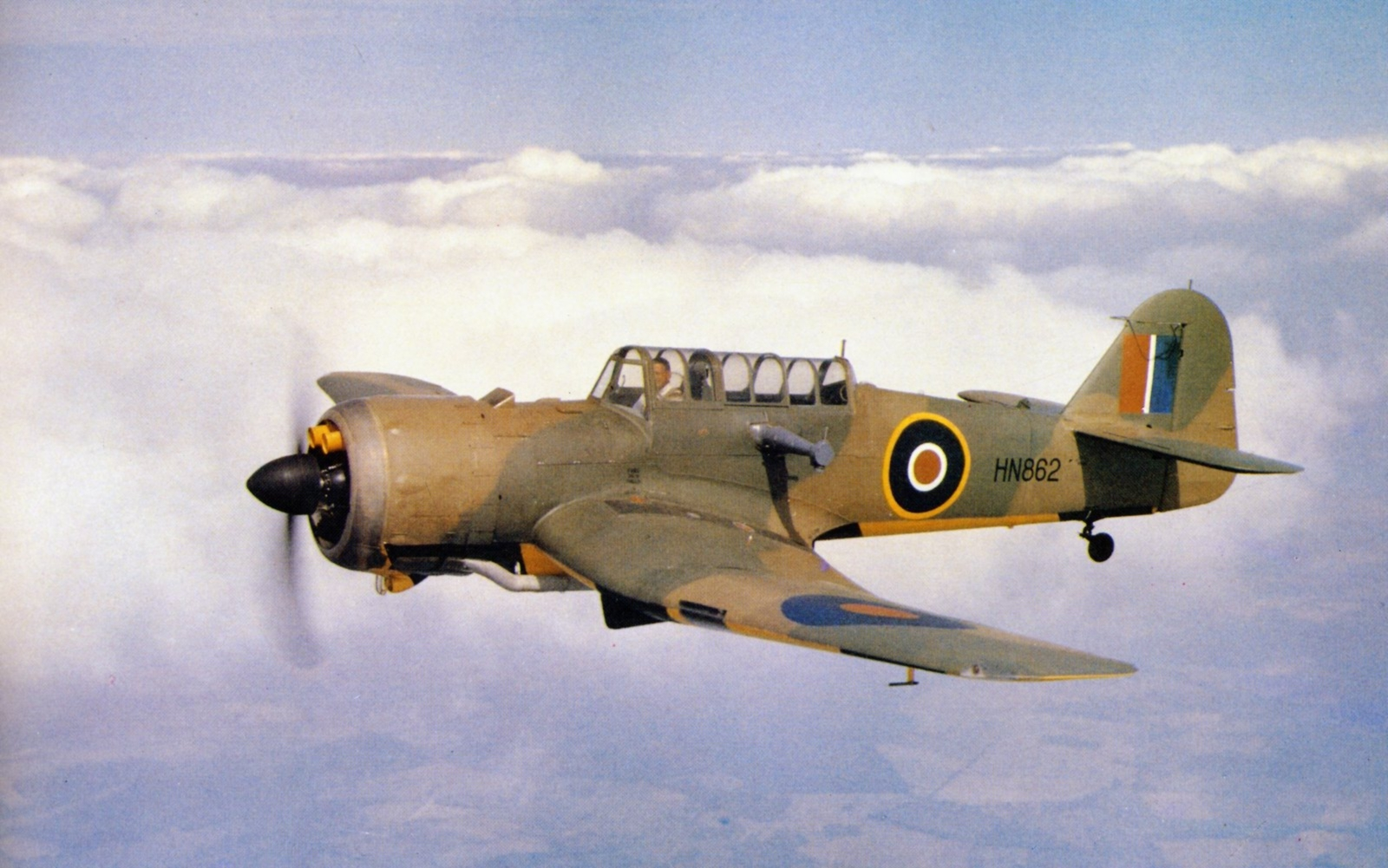

General information
- Type: Target tug
- Manufacturer: Miles Aircraft
- Status: Retired
- Primary users: Royal Air Force Royal Navy; French Air Force; Belgian Air Force
- Number built: 1,724

History
- Manufactured: 1942–1945
- First flight: 24 April 1942
- Developed from: Miles Master

The Miles M.25 Martinet was a target tug aircraft of the Royal Air Force (RAF) and Fleet Air Arm (FAA) that was in service during the Second World War. It was the first British aircraft to be designed specifically for target towing.

Work on the Martinet was started in response to the RAF's shortage of obsolete frontline aircraft for target towing duties. A derivative of the Master trainer, it was designed to have as much in common with existing production aircraft as possible. The prototype Martinet made its maiden flight on 24 April 1942 and quantity production started immediately. A total of 1,724 Martinets were produced, of which the majority were operated either by the RAF or FAA, although some were used by overseas and civilian operators.

The Martinet was also developed into a relatively secret aircraft in response to Specification Q.10/43, which called for a radio-controlled target drone. This aircraft, designated the M.50 Queen Martinet, was only produced in small numbers, and its existence was a state secret until 1946. Several other derivatives of the basic airframe were also produced, including a glider tug and a trainer variant.

== Development ==
=== Origins ===
Before 1941, the target tug role had been met by reusing former frontline aircraft which had either become obsolete or were surplus to requirements. However, while the crucial Battle of Britain was being waged and attrition rates were driven high amongst either side, the RAF found itself with a shortage of frontline aircraft. Seeking to avoid withdrawing existing combat-capable aircraft to perform as target tugs, the Air Ministry opted to procure new build aircraft specifically for this need, approaching Miles Aircraft Ltd with a request to rapidly produce a specialised target tug aircraft based upon the Miles Master trainer aircraft.

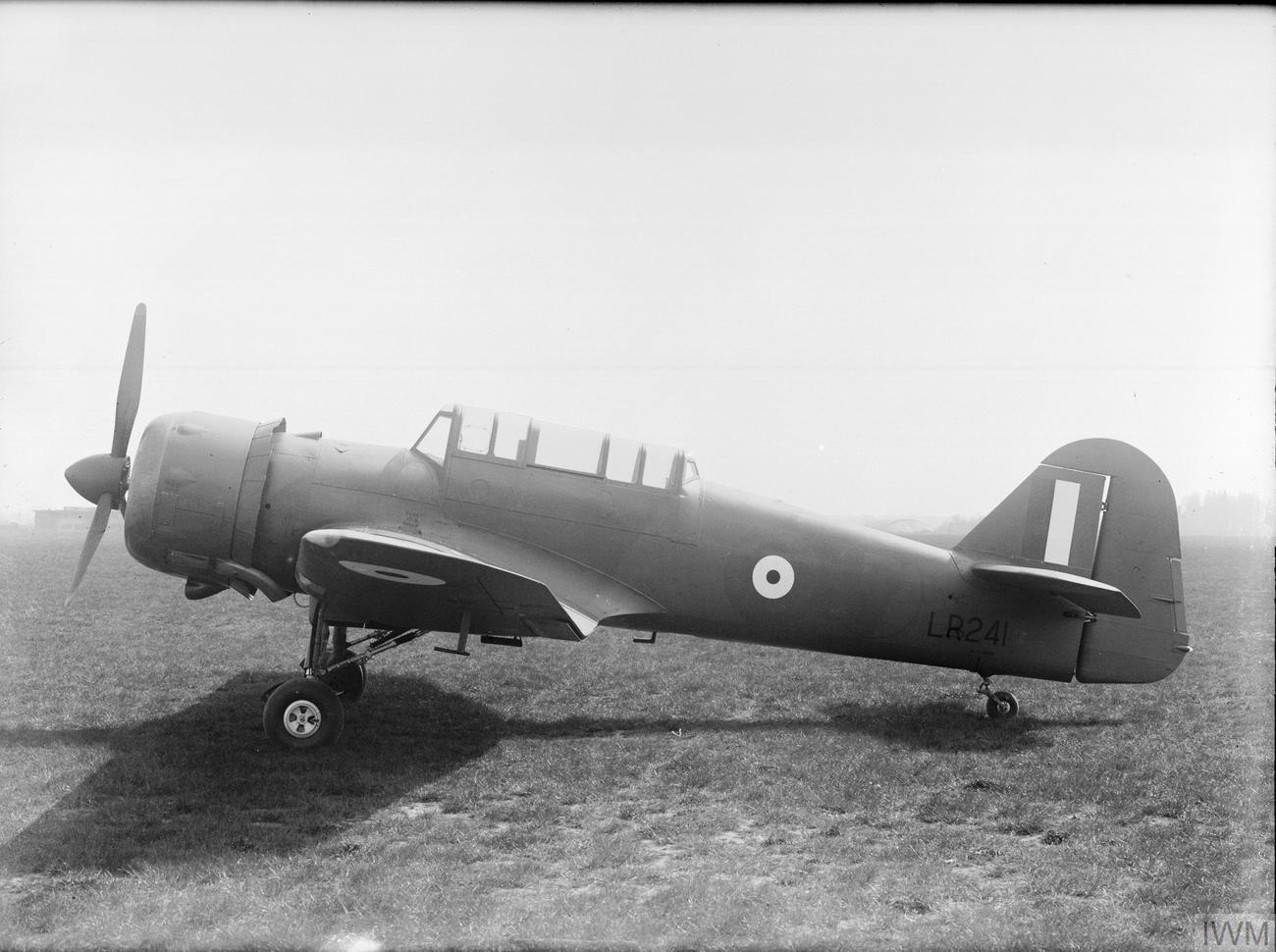
The Miles Martinet prototype, serial LR241, at Reading, Berkshire, circa 1942

The requirements were formalised by the Ministry as Specification 12/41. Amongst the listed requirements was a stipulation that, in order to simplify manufacturing as much as possible, the envisioned aircraft ought maximise the use of standardised components wherever feasible.

On 24 April 1942, the first prototype Martinet made its maiden flight from Woodley Aerodrome, flown by chief test pilot Flight Lieutenant Thomas Rose. Results were satisfactory enough for production to begin immediately, leading to the Martinet rapidly supplanting the Master II on Miles' assembly lines at Woodley. In total 1,724 Martinets were produced; the majority of which served with either the RAF or Fleet Air Arm (FAA), although a minority of the type were adopted by overseas operators as well during the post war era.

=== Further development ===
The Martinet became the basis for further projects by the company. During 1943, it was decided to produce a derivative of the Martinet that functioned as a radio-controlled target drone to meet Specification Q.10/43. This variant, designated M.50 Queen Martinet, was quickly prototyped and a modest production contact was issued to Miles, leading to 69 examples being manufactured as a new-builds, while a further 17 aircraft were produced via the conversion of production Martinets. During its development and initial years of operation, the existence of the Queen Martinet was classified and the programme was held on the UK Government's Secrets List; it was first publicly displayed at the Farnborough Airshow in June 1946, although details about the type remained protected for a number of years thereafter.

By 1941, officials were considered a proposed improved model of the Master trainer, but such ambitions were sidelined to focus manufacturing resources on the standard Martinet model. By 1945, production pressures had alleviated to the point where serious work could commence, thus Miles set about developing a trainer model of the aircraft, designated M.37 Martinet Trainer. From the onset, this aircraft was intended to be a stopgap measure as the Air Ministry had envisioned its long term trainer to harness turboprop propulsion. The conversion involved the removal of the outboard wing fuel tanks, the installation of a revised cabin with dual controls fitted, and a reduction in overall weight. A pair of prototypes were built, the first of which made its maiden flight on 11 April 1946. However, by the time it was ready for quantity production, more advanced trainers, such as the Avro Athena and Boulton Paul Balliol, had also reached an advanced stage of development, leaving no purpose for the type and thus it received no orders.

A more numerous variant of the Martinet was the adaption of the type for operating as a tug for gliders; it shared broad similarities to the Master II tug, the rudder having its lower portion removed along with the installation of stronger towing apparatus.

== Design ==
The Miles Martinet draws heavily upon the Miles Master II trainer aircraft. While the two aircraft shared a relatively high degree of commonality, particularly in terms of components, there were also major differences, including the strengthening of the airframe to better handle the stresses of towing a target drogue. Other differences from the Master included a longer nose, greater wingspan, and higher cockpit, while the dual flying controls of the Master were omitted as unnecessary in its new capacity.

Both the targets and towing gear were contained in a fairing beneath the fuselage, which could be deployed and retracted by a winch; multiple implementations of this apparatus were used, including winches that were alternatively driven via electric motors or wind power. Due to the aircraft's centre of gravity being altered by the design modifications, the engine was brought forwards slightly to compensate; while a more heavy-duty cooling system was also installed to aid the engine in coping with the greater power output needed to offset the elevated drag that was induced while towing.

== Operational history ==
Numerous RAF units received Martinets during the Second World War. Specifically, the type became a staple of air gunnery schools, operational training units, anti-aircraft cooperation squadrons, and air-sea reconnaissance units.

During the late 1940s and early 1950s, the type was gradually withdrawn from service within Britain's armed forces. A total of five former RAF Martinets received civil registrations and were flown by civilians both in Britain and overseas. Efforts were made to promote surplus Martinet to fulfil additional roles, one such proposal involved the type's adoption by the Royal Hellenic Air Force to perform missions such as artillery spotting, general observation, and close air support.

== Variants ==
M.25 Martinet
Two-seat target tug aircraft.
Martinet TT.Mk I
Service designation for the target tug M.25.
M.50 Queen Martinet
Unmanned radio-controlled target drone; 11 built and 58 converted from TT.1s.
M.37 Martinet Trainer
Two-seat training aircraft; two converted from TT.1s.

== Operators ==
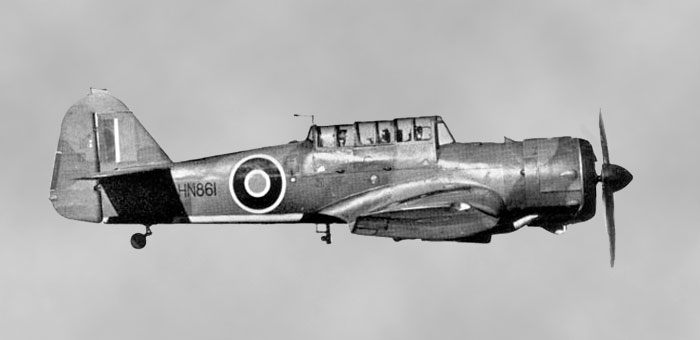
Martinet in RAF service

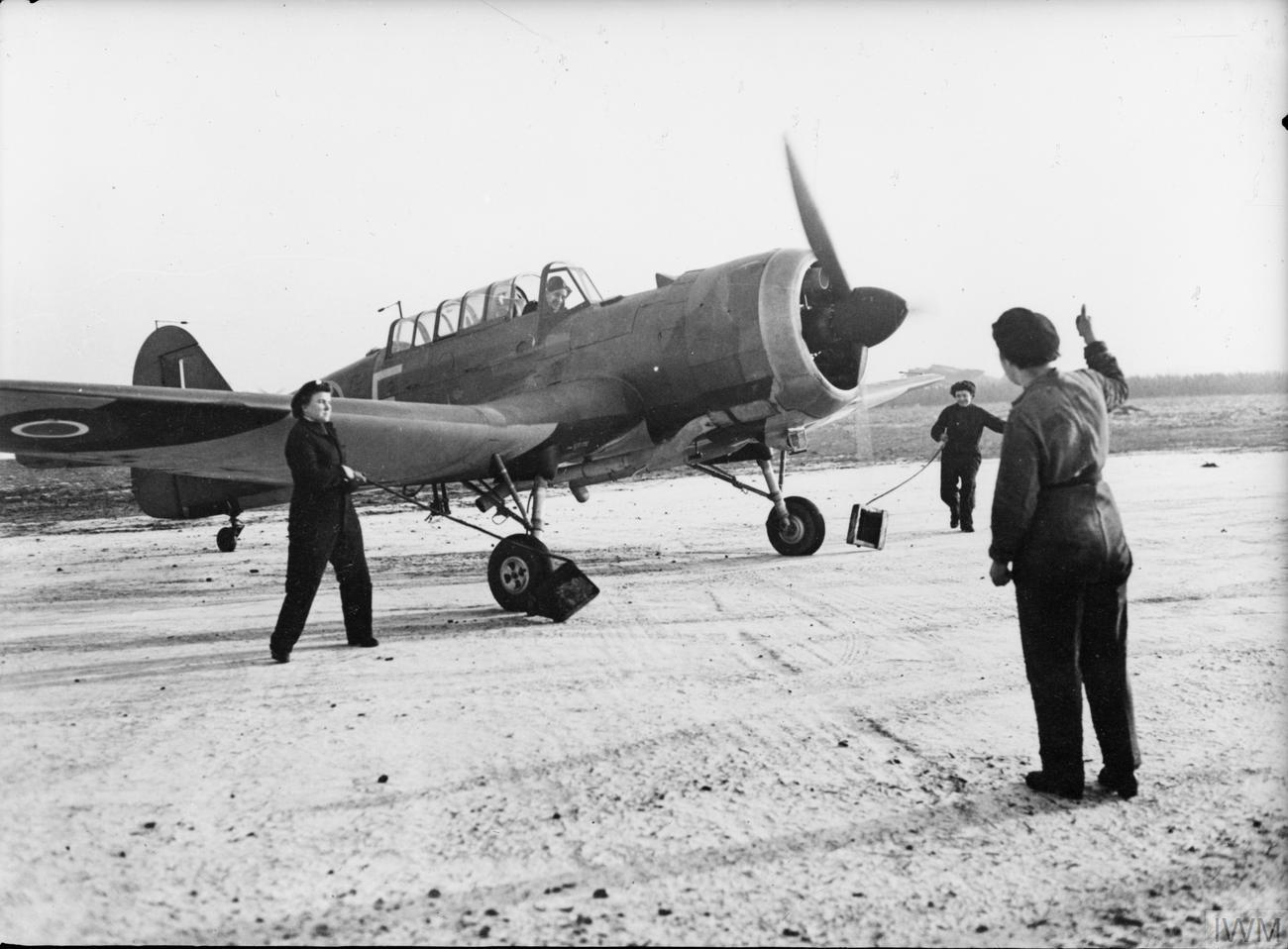
A Martinet of No. 289 Squadron at RAF Turnhouse, Midlothian, Scotland, circa 1943

Belgium

- Belgian Air Force (11 operated from 1947 to 1953 as target tugs)

France

- French Air Force – 41 Martinet TT.1s were delivered between 1945 and 1948.

Ireland

- Irish Air Corps – two Martinet TT.1s were delivered in 1946.

Portugal

- Portuguese Navy
- Portuguese Air Force

Sweden

- Svensk Flygtjänst AB (9 bought, 8 used as target tugs 1946–1951)

Turkey

- Turkish Air Force

United Kingdom

- Royal Air Force

- No. 5 Squadron RAF
- No. 20 Squadron RAF
- No. 34 Squadron RAF
- No. 269 Squadron RAF
- No. 285 Squadron RAF
- No. 286 Squadron RAF
- No. 287 Squadron RAF
- No. 289 Squadron RAF
- No. 290 Squadron RAF
- No. 291 Squadron RAF
- No. 520 Squadron RAF
- No. 567 Squadron RAF
- No. 577 Squadron RAF
- No. 587 Squadron RAF
- No. 595 Squadron RAF
- No. 598 Squadron RAF
- No. 631 Squadron RAF
- No. 639 Squadron RAF
- No. 650 Squadron RAF
- No. 679 Squadron RAF
- No. 691 Squadron RAF
- No. 695 Squadron RAF

- Royal Navy Fleet Air Arm

Data from:

- 718 Naval Air Squadron
- 722 Naval Air Squadron
- 723 Naval Air Squadron
- 725 Naval Air Squadron
- 726 Naval Air Squadron
- 728 Naval Air Squadron
- 733 Naval Air Squadron
- 736 Naval Air Squadron
- 740 Naval Air Squadron
- 766 Naval Air Squadron
- 770 Naval Air Squadron
- 771 Naval Air Squadron
- 772 Naval Air Squadron
- 773 Naval Air Squadron
- 775 Naval Air Squadron
- 776 Naval Air Squadron
- 779 Naval Air Squadron
- 789 Naval Air Squadron
- 792 Naval Air Squadron
- 793 Naval Air Squadron
- 794 Naval Air Squadron
- 797 Naval Air Squadron

== Surviving aircraft ==
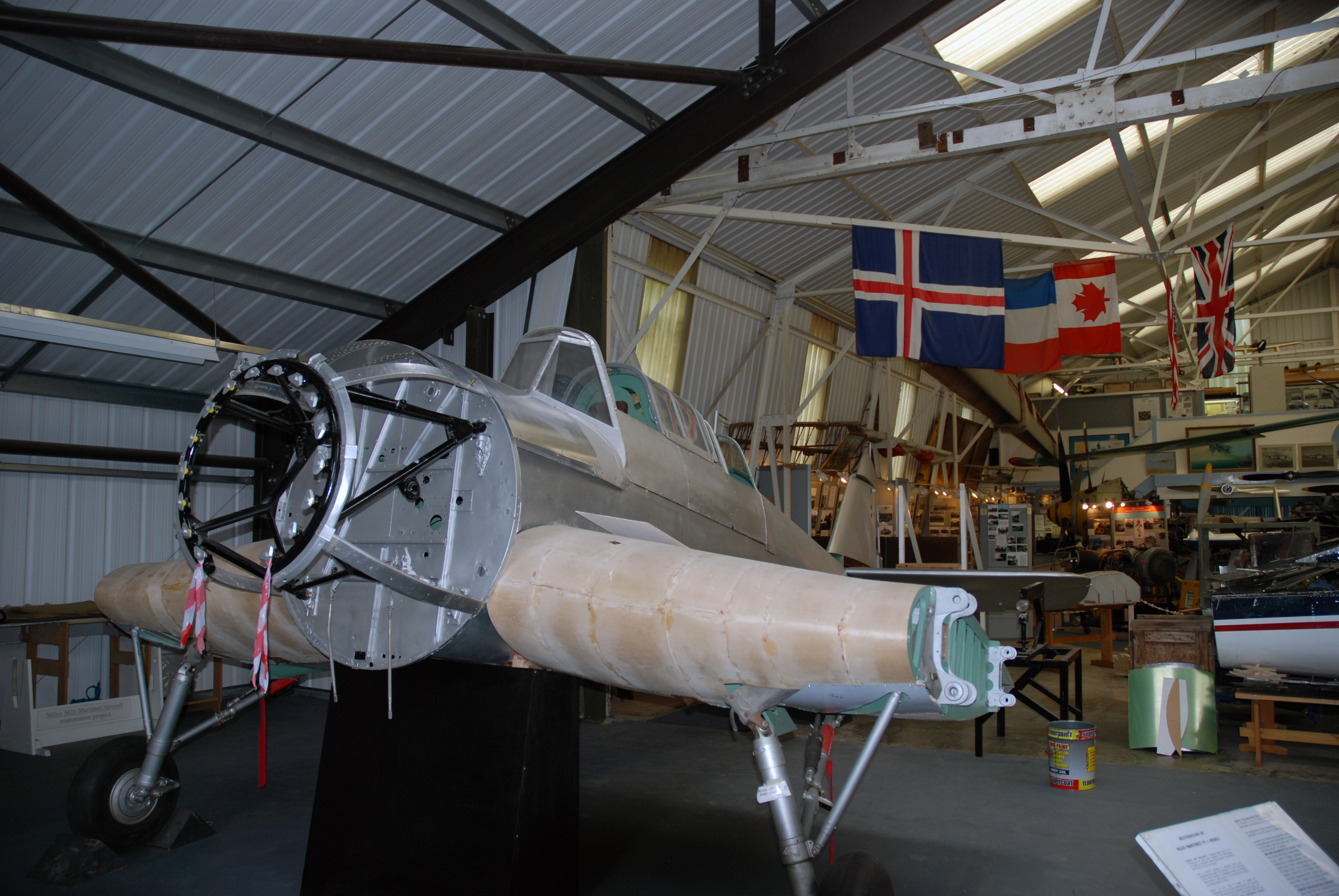
The preserved MS902 at the Museum of Berkshire Aviation, June 2008

A single Martinet survives; it is owned by the Museum of Berkshire Aviation in the United Kingdom. The aircraft (RAF serial number MS902) was built in 1943, and spent its operational life in Iceland at RAF Reykjavik. In 1949, MS902 was sold to the Akureyri Flying Club and given the Icelandic civil registration TF-SHC. The club flew it until it crashed in 1951 near Kopasker in north-east Iceland. The wreckage remained at the crash site until 1977, when it was recovered and placed in storage by the Icelandic Aviation Historical Society.

The aircraft was returned to the United Kingdom in 1996 by the Museum of Berkshire Aviation and has since been the subject of a lengthy restoration project.

== Specifications (M.25) ==
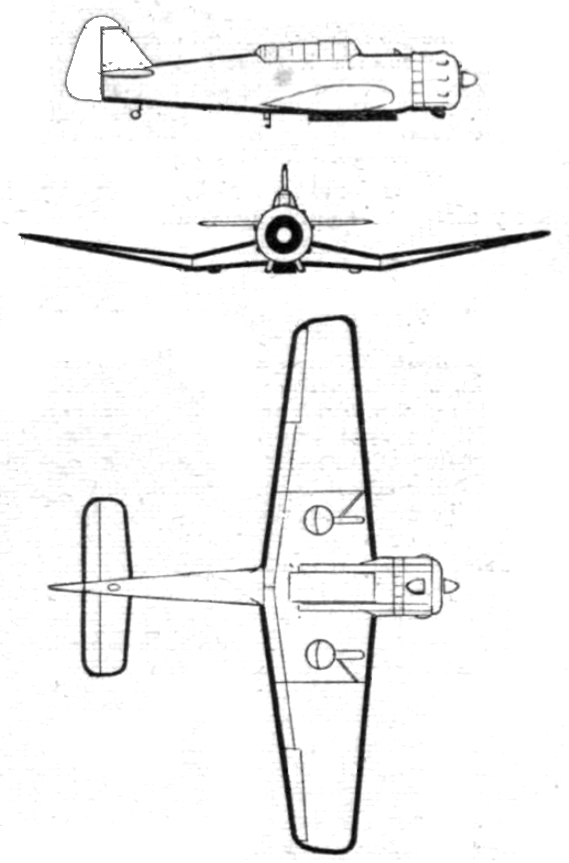

Data from Miles Aircraft since 1925, The Hamlyn Concise Guide to British Aircraft of World War II.

General characteristics

- Crew: 2
- Length: 30 ft 11 in (9.42 m)
- Wingspan: 39 ft 0 in (11.89 m)
- Height: 11 ft 7 in (3.53 m)
- Wing area: 242 sq ft (22.5 m^{2})
- Aspect ratio: 6.3
- Airfoil: root: NACA 23024; tip: NACA 23009
- Empty weight: 4,640 lb (2,105 kg)
- Gross weight: 6,750 lb (3,062 kg)
- Powerplant: 1 × Bristol Mercury XX or Mercury 30 9-cylinder air-cooled radial piston engine, 870 hp (650 kW)
- Propellers: 3-bladed constant-speed propeller

Performance

- Maximum speed: 221 mph (356 km/h, 192 kn) at sea level

240 mph (210 kn; 390 km/h) at 5,800 ft (1,800 m)
238 mph (207 kn; 383 km/h) at 10,000 ft (3,000 m)

- Cruise speed: 199 mph (320 km/h, 173 kn) maximum at 5,000 ft (1,500 m)
- Stall speed: 62 mph (100 km/h, 54 kn) flaps down

83 mph (72 kn; 134 km/h) flaps up

- Never exceed speed: 330 mph (530 km/h, 290 kn) IAS
- Range: 694 mi (1,117 km, 603 nmi)
- Endurance: 5 hours
- Time to altitude: 5,000 ft (1,500 m) in 3 minutes 30 seconds

10,000 ft (3,000 m) in 8 minutes

- Wing loading: 27.9 lb/sq ft (136 kg/m^{2})
- Power/mass: 0.235 hp/lb (0.386 kW/kg)
- Take-off run: 780 ft (240 m)
- Take-off distance to 50 ft (15 m): 1,380 ft (420 m)
- Landing run: 1,275 ft (389 m)
- Landing distance from 50 ft (15 m): 1,614 ft (492 m)

== See also ==
Related development

- Miles Master

Related lists

- List of aircraft of the Royal Air Force
- List of aircraft of World War II
