= Newtownards Airport =

Aerodrome in Newtownards, Northern Ireland

Newtownards Aerodrome
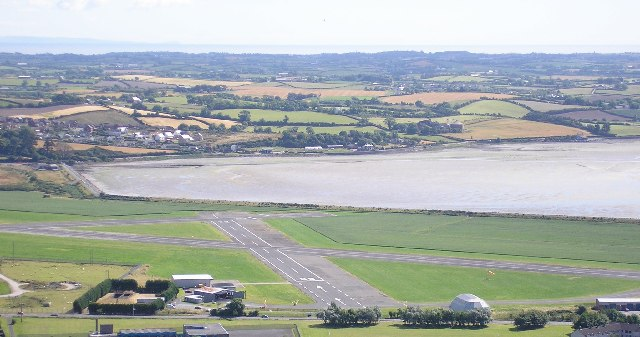
- IATA: none; ICAO: EGAD

Summary
- Airport type: Public
- Operator: Ulster Flying Club
- Location: Newtownards, Northern Ireland
- Elevation AMSL: 9 ft (2.7 m)
- Coordinates: 54°34′52″N 005°41′31″W
- Website: ulsterflyingclub.com

Map
- Location in County Down Location in Northern Ireland Location in Ireland Location in the UK

Runways
Direction	Length		Surface
Direction	m	ft	Surface
03/21	791	2,595	Asphalt
08/26	566	1,857	Asphalt
15/33	640	2,100	Asphalt
- Sources: UK AIP at NATS

Newtownards Aerodrome (ICAO: EGAD) is a local airfield in Newtownards, County Down, Northern Ireland, 8.5 NM (15.7 km; 9.8 mi) east of Belfast. It offers light aircraft flights (operated by the Ulster Flying Club), helicopter flights (operated by HeliPower), microlight flights (operated by NI Microlights) and flight simulator training (by AlphaTech). The airport also has an onsite restaurant.

Newtownards Aerodrome has a CAA Ordinary Licence (number P659) that allows flights for the public transport of passengers or for flying instruction as authorised by the licensee (Ulster Flying Club (1961) Limited).

== Airfield history and operations ==
Newtownards Airfield opened in August 1934 and until the construction of Sydenham airfield (at Belfast Harbour, later a full airport) in March 1938, was served by UK scheduled internal passenger and mail flights.

The following Royal Air Force units were here at some point under RAF Newtownards:

- 'S' Flight of No. 1 Anti-Aircraft Co-operation Unit RAF (January – November 1942) became No. 1617 (Anti-Aircraft Co-operation) Flight RAF
- Detachment of No. 6 Anti-Aircraft Co-operation Unit RAF (May 1942 – May 1943 & May – August 1943)
- Detachment of No. 7 Anti-Aircraft Co-operation Unit RAF (April – May 1941)
- No. 13 Squadron RAF
- Relief Landing Ground for No. 24 Elementary Flying Training School RAF (November 1939 – July 1940)
- No. 79 (Signals) Wing Calibration Flight RAF
- No. 82 Group Communication Flight RAF (January 1942 – June 1943)
- No. 96 (Wireless) Wing RAF (? – May 1944)
- No. 201 Gliding School RAF (April 1944 – May 1946)
- No. 203 Gliding School RAF (May 1945 – July 1947)
- No. 416 (Army Co-operation) Flight RAF (June – July 1940) became No. 231 Squadron RAF
- No. 664 Volunteer Gliding School RAF (November 1995 – March 2016)
- No. 1480 (Anti-Aircraft Co-operation) Flight RAF (December 1941 – December 1943) became No. 290 Squadron RAF
- No. 1493 (Fighter) Gunnery Flight RAF (January – May 1942) became No. 1493 (Target Towing) Flight RAF (May – January 1943)
- No. 2775 Squadron RAF Regiment
- RAF Northern Ireland Communication Flight RAF (May 1944 – 1945)

== Ulster Flying Club ==
The airfield is the home base of the Ulster Flying Club (UFC). The club was founded in 1961 and grew to become Northern Ireland's largest flying school and one of the largest, non-commercial training and flying organisations in Northern Ireland. The club manages the airfield's facilities. The clubhouse is open to the public for snacks and for viewing activities at the airfield; a new clubhouse was opened in 2005 after the destruction of the last clubhouse by a fire in 2004. Many private pilot owners and self-build constructors base their aircraft in the several hangars on the airfield.

The Ulster Flying Club has continued to develop as a centre for private flying and so the ends of existing runways were re-surfaced and the grass strip tarmacked. The Ulster Flying Club has allowed the airfield to be used for various events including air display days and motorsport events.

The Ulster Flying Club provides both leisure flights and flight training for those who wish to pursue a pilot's licence. The club operates a fleet of five fixed wing aircraft, consisting of two Cessna 172 SPs, one Cessna 152, one Ikarus C42 and one CZAW SportCruiser,

One aircraft was involved in a fatal crash in April 2018.

Recently added new PAPI lights on runway 21/03 and lights on runway 15/33 have allowed the airfield and UFC to safely carry out night flying and flying in bad visibility.

A report dated 18 May 2023 by the Air Accidents Investigation Branch into the fatal crash on 19 July 2022 of Aeroprakt A32 Vixxen, G-ENVV highlighted multiple concerns and failings regarding the operation of the airfield and an apparent cavalier attitude to safety procedures by some pilots and the operating committee.

=== Radio frequencies ===
The airfield operates an A/G service and until 25 October 2018 the frequency was 128.300mHz; it has since moved to an 8.33 channel and is now 128.305

== Fixed Base Operators ==
Ards Model Flying Club

Formed in 2019, the Ards Model Flying Club operates from premises at the Western side of the Airfield. The club participates in all disciplines of radio controlled aircraft flying and is affiliated to the British Model Flying Association.

HeliPower

HeliPower operates leisure and charter flights as well as helicopter flight training for the PPL (H) pilot licence. They operate several rotary aircraft including Robinson R22, R44 and Bell Jet Ranger.

NI Microlights

NI Microlights is an independent flight school operating from the airfield. They offer a range of Microlight services including NPPL tuition and trial flights, flight tests, aircraft sales, servicing, permits and repairs. Training is carried out on the Thruster T600 Sprint (fixed wing) and the P&M GT450 (flexwing).

AlphaTech flight simulator training

AlphaTech carry out flight simulator training for the Airbus A320 series of aircraft. They operate a fixed base simulator training device, which is used for professional pilot flight training, SimPilot training and flight experiences.

O'Neill aircraft maintenance

Aircraft maintenance for permit and vintage aircraft is carried out by a small group of aircraft engineers based in the O'Neill hangar. Annual permit inspections, kit build projects, routine maintenance, engine and airframe repairs are carried out by inspectors approved by the Light Aircraft Association (LAA) and the British Microlight Aircraft Association (BMAA).

== See also ==
- List of former Royal Air Force stations
