= 733 Naval Air Squadron =

Inactive flying squadron of the Royal Navy's Fleet Air Arm

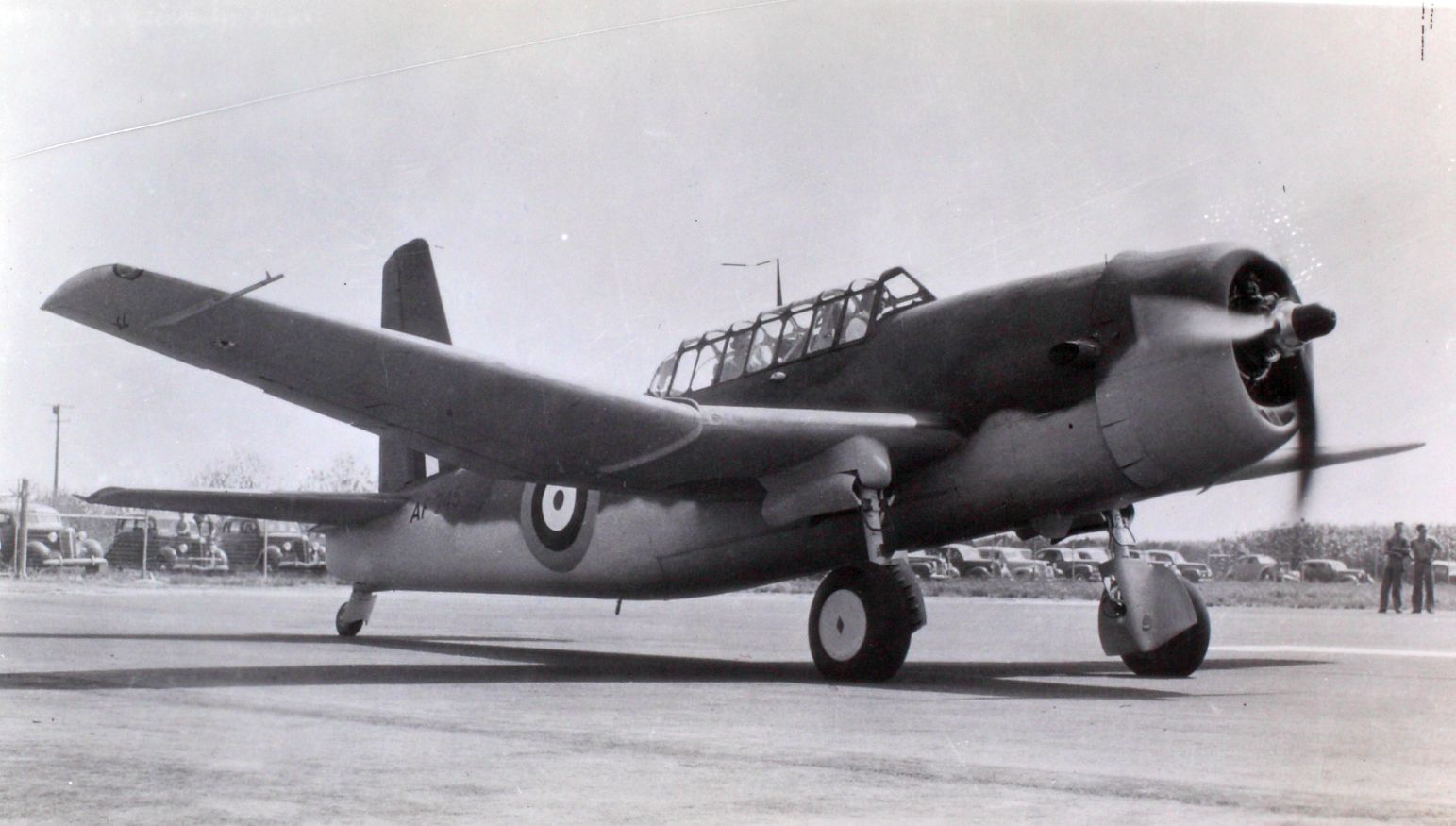
- Vultee Vengeance of the type used by 733 NAS
- Active: 1944–1947
- Disbanded: 31 December 1947
- Country: United Kingdom
- Branch: Royal Navy
- Type: Fleet Air Arm Second Line Squadron
- Role: Fleet Requirements Unit
- Size: Squadron
- Part of: Fleet Air Arm
- Home station: RN Air Section Minneriya; RNAS Trincomalee (HMS Bambara)
- Mottos: Sursum nubes (Latin for 'Upwards into the clouds')
- Aircraft: See Aircraft flown section for full list.

Insignia
- Squadron Badge Description: White, upon a pellet two beams of light in saltire white surmounted by an eagle valiant gold armed and langue's red (1944)
- Identification Markings: C8A+ & C9A+ uncoded (from 1946)

733 Naval Air Squadron (733 NAS) was a Fleet Air Arm (FAA) naval air squadron of the United Kingdom’s Royal Navy (RN). It was active between January 1944 and December 1947, entirely in Ceylon (now Sri Lanka), as a Fleet Requirements Unit, based mainly at R.N. Air Section China Bay, which became HMS Bambara, RNAS Trincomalee, China Bay, Ceylon. The squadron initially formed at R.N. Air Section Minneriya, at RAF Minnerya, Ceylon, two weeks after an advance party arrived there, remaining for three months after formation before relocating.

== History ==
=== Fleet Requirement Unit (1944–1947) ===
733 Naval Air Squadron formed as a Fleet Requirements Unit for the British Eastern Fleet on 1 January 1944 at RN Air Section Minnerya, where the Admiralty had lodger facilities for an RN squadron at the Royal Air Force (RAF) heavy bomber airfield at RAF Minnerya, located in Hingurakgoda, Ceylon. On 25 March 1944, the squadron relocated to RN Air Section China Bay, located in China Bay in eastern Ceylon, where the RN had lodger facilities at RAF China Bay, bringing along a varied example of aircraft used by the FAA, including Grumman Avenger, an American torpedo bomber, Miles Martinet target tug aircraft, Grumman Wildcat, an American carrier-based fighter aircraft, Bristol Beaufighter, a British multirole combat aircraft, Fairey Swordfish, a biplane torpedo bomber and Fairey Barracuda a British torpedo and dive bomber.

The squadron’s roles included radar calibration, which required pilots to fly at a specific height and speed, notably, one pilot was tasked to fly halfway to Singapore and back at 30,000 feet (9,100 m). The squadron acquired other aircraft during its existence including Boulton Paul Defiant, a night fighter converted to target tug variant, Stinson Reliant, a liaison and training aircraft, a de Havilland Mosquito bomber variant, Vought Corsair, an American carrier-based fighter-bomber, Vultee Vengeance, an American dive bomber and Supermarine Seafire, a navalised version of the Supermarine Spitfire fighter aircraft.

The squadron took some Beech Expeditor, an American trainer, transport and utility aircraft from 742 Naval Air Squadron, when it disbanded during August. Initially using Supermarine Walrus, an amphibious maritime patrol aircraft, and later on Supermarine Sea Otter, an amphibious air-sea rescue aircraft, an Air Sea Rescue Flight was added around the beginning of 1946. The squadron disbanded on 31 December 1947 at RNAS Trincomalee (HMS Bambara), RAF China Bay had been transferred to the Admiralty, on 15 November 1944 and renamed RNAS Trincomalee.

== Aircraft flown ==
733 Naval Air Squadron has flown a number of different aircraft types, including:

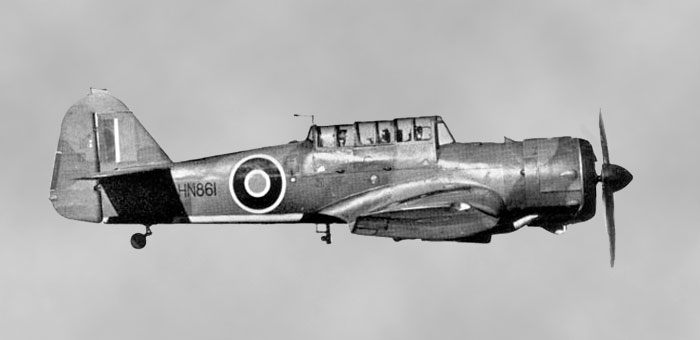
Miles Martinet TT.Mk I

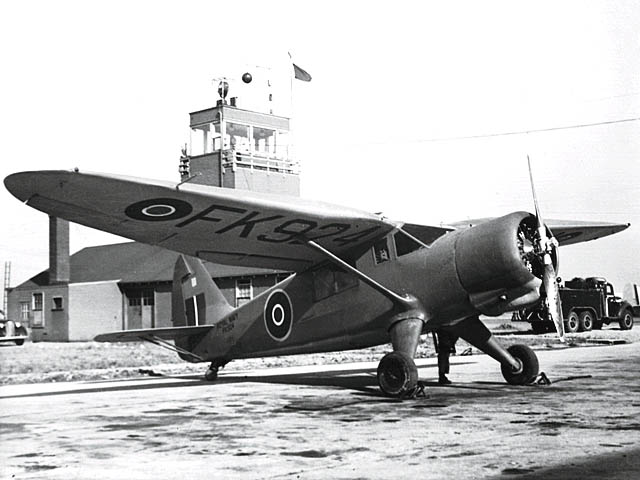
Stinson Reliant

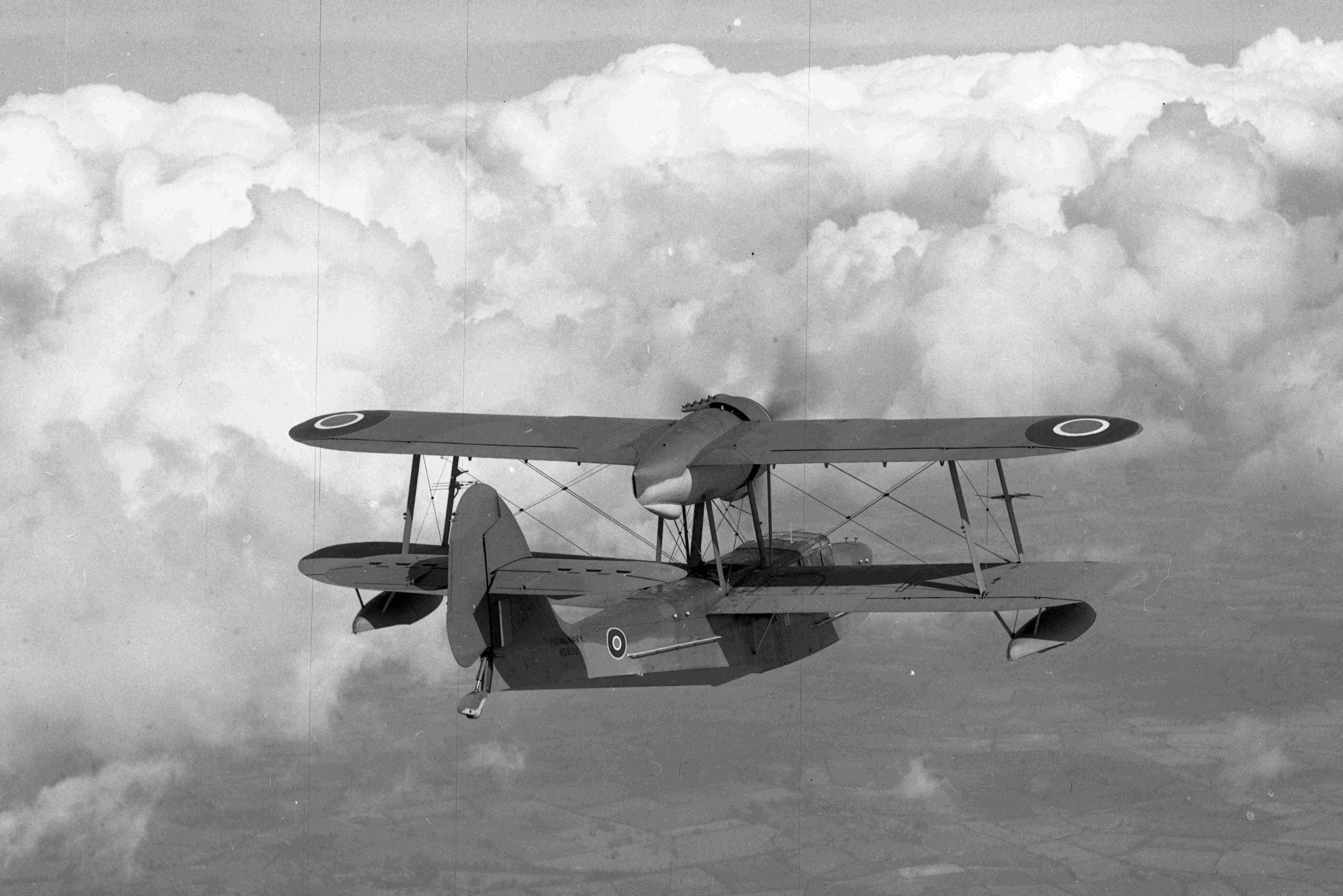
Supermarine Sea otter ASR Mk.II

- Fairey Albacore torpedo bomber (1944-1945)
- Bristol Beaufort Mk.I torpedo bomber (1944 - March 1945)
- Grumman Tarpon GR.I torpedo bomber (January - April 1944)
- Fairey Fulmar Mk.II reconnaissance/fighter aircraft (January - August 1944)
- Fairey Swordfish I torpedo bomber (January - December 1944)
- Bristol Beaufighter Mark IIF night fighter (January 1944 - July 1945)
- Boulton Paul Defiant TT Mk I target tug (January 1944 - October 1946)
- Miles Martinet TT.Mk I target tug (March 1944 - November 1945)
- Grumman Avenger Mk.II torpedo bomber (March 1944 - November 1945)
- Stinson Reliant iaison and training aircraft (April 1944 - November 1945)
- Grumman Wildcat Mk V fighter aircraft (June 1944 - November 1945)
- Fairey Barracuda II torpedo and dive bomber (September 1944 - April 1945)
- North American Harvard IIB advanced trainer aircraft (December 1944 - October 1947)
- Vultee Vengeance II (July 1945 - December 1947)
- Fairey Swordfish II torpedo bomber (September 1945 - July 1946)
- Vought Corsair Mk IV fighter-bomber (October 1945 - October 1946)
- de Havilland Mosquito B Mk 25 bomber (November - December 1945)
- Supermarine Walrus amphibious maritime patrol aircraft (March - November 1946)
- Beech Expeditor C.II trainer, transport and utility aircraft (August 1946 - December 1947)
- Supermarine Sea Otter Mk I air-sea rescue aircraft (August 1946 - December 1947)
- Supermarine Sea Otter Mk II air-sea rescue aircraft (August 1946 - December 1947)
- Supermarine Seafire F Mk III fighter aircraft (October - December 1946)
- de Havilland Tiger Moth trainer aircraft (January - April 1947)
- Supermarine Seafire F Mk XV fighter aircraft (January - December 1947)

== Naval air stations ==
733 Naval Air Squadron operated from a couple of naval air stations of the Royal Navy, overseas:

- RN Air Section Minneriya, Ceylon, advance party (15 December 1943 - 1 January 1944)
- RN Air Section Minneriya, Ceylon, (1 January 1944 - 25 March 1944)
- RN Air Section China Bay / Royal Naval Air Station Trincomalee (HMS Bambara), Ceylon, (25 March 1944 - 31 December 1947)
  - RN Air Section Minneriya, Ceylon, (detachment 25 March - 12 August 1944)
- disbanded - (31 December 1947)

== Commanding officers ==
List of commanding officers of 733 Naval Air Squadron with date of appointment:

- Lieutenant Commander(A) R.A. Beard, RNVR, from 1 January 1944
- Lieutenant Commander(A) L. Gilbert, RNVR, from 1 April 1944
- Lieutenant Commander(A) J.A. Ansell, RNVR, from 6 October 1944
- Lieutenant Commander(A) I.O. Robertson, RNVR, from 9 August 1945
- Lieutenant Commander(A) H.J. Mortimore, RNVR, from 15 December 1945
- disbanded - 31 December 1947

Note: Abbreviation (A) signifies Air Branch of the RN or RNVR.
