= Rachel Christoffelsz =

Sri Lankan physician

Rachel Christoffelsz (29 September 1885 – 1975) was a Sri Lankan doctor. She was one of the first women from the country to qualify as a doctor.

== Biography ==
Christoffelsz completed her medical studies in 1909. She worked as a medical officer in Colombo Municipal Medical Service and practiced pediatrics and antenatal care in Colombo until 1925.

Christoffelsz retired from medical practice in 1927.

=== Personal life ===
In 1925, Christoffelsz married Arthur Percival Rowlands, owner of Rowlands Garages.
