= No. 289 Squadron RAF =

- Active: 17 November 1941 – 26 June 1945
- Country: United Kingdom
- Branch: Royal Air Force
- Motto: None

Insignia
- Squadron Badge: None
- Squadron Code: YE (November 1941 –June 1945)

No. 289 Squadron RAF was a Royal Air Force squadron formed as an anti-aircraft cooperation unit in World War II.

== History ==
The squadron formed at RAF Kirknewton on 17 November 1941 and was equipped with Lysanders and Blenheims, Hurricanes and Hudsons to provide practice for the anti-aircraft defences in Scotland by towing targets and conducting simulated attacks. The squadron moved to RAF Turnhouse and RAF West Freugh, then operated other aircraft types from bases in England before it was disbanded at RAF Andover on 26 June 1945.

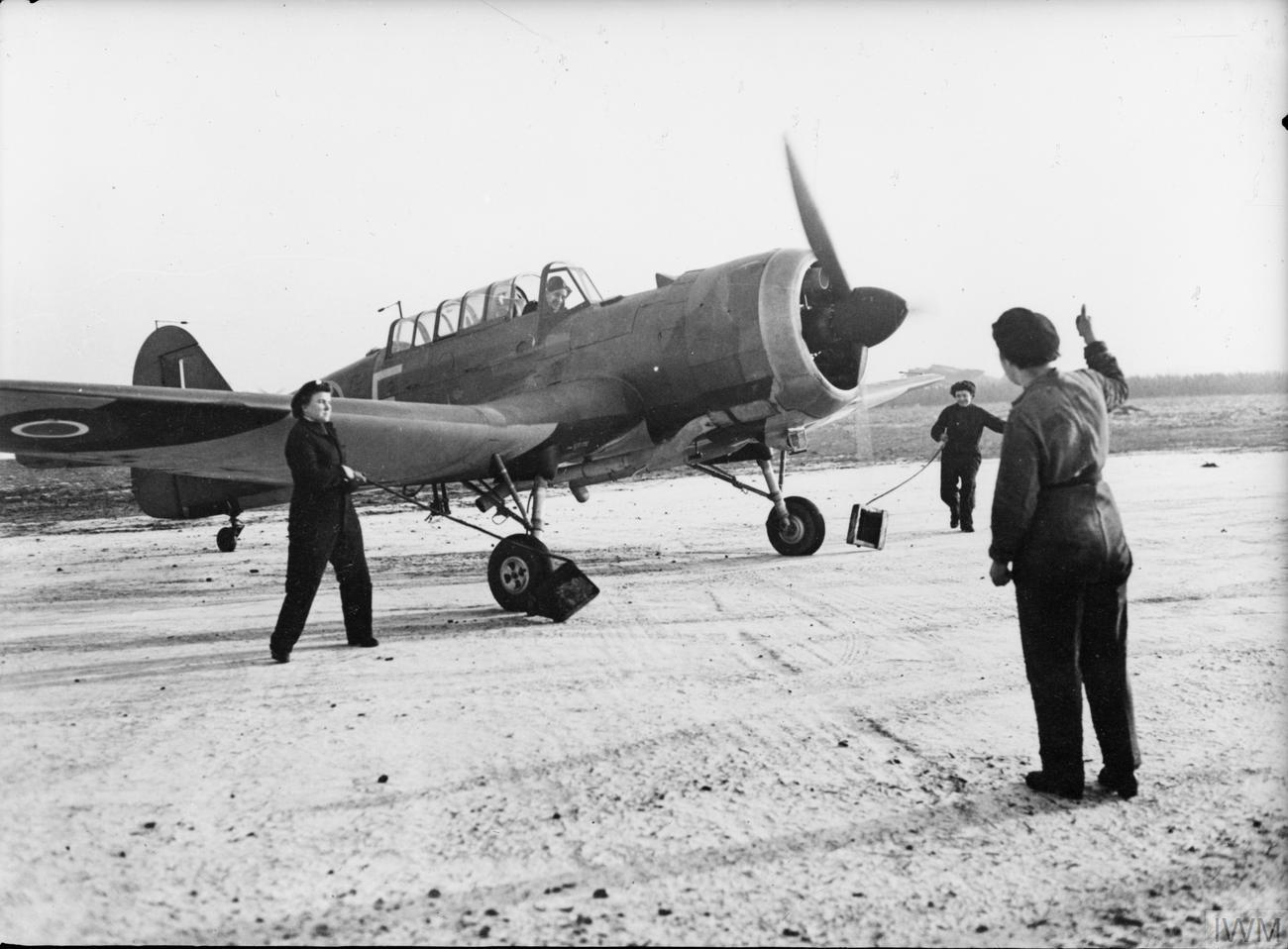
A Miles Martinet TT Mark I target tug of No. 289 Squadron at Turnhouse with WAAF ground crew

== Aircraft operated ==
Aircraft operated by No. 289 Squadron RAF
From	To	Aircraft	Variant
Nov 1941	Jan 1942	Bristol Blenheim	IIC
Nov 1941	Mar 1942	Westland Lysander	III
Nov 1941	Mar 1942	Lockheed Hudson	III
Nov 1941	Jun 1945	Hawker Hurricane	I, IIC, IV
Mar 1942	Jun 1945	Airspeed Oxford	
Mar 1942	Jul 1943	Boulton Paul Defiant	I, III
Jun 1943	Mar 1945	Miles Martinet	
Mar 1945	Jun 1945	Vultee Vengeance	IV
