= No. 691 Squadron RAF =

Defunct flying squadron of the Royal Air Force

- Active: 1 December 1943 – 11 February 1949
- Country: United Kingdom
- Branch: Royal Air Force
- Type: Inactive
- Role: Anti-aircraft cooperation
- Part of: No. 70 Group RAF, Air Defense of Great Britain (1943–1944); No. 11 Group RAF, Fighter Command (1944–1949)
- Mottos: Latin: Volamus Ut Serviamus (Translation: "We fly to serve")

Insignia
- Squadron Badge: In front of a sword and anchor in saltire, a popinjay
- Squadron Codes: 5S (December 1943 – February 1949)

No. 691 Squadron RAF was an Anti-aircraft cooperation squadron of the Royal Air Force from 1943 to 1949.

== History ==
The squadron was formed on 1 December 1943 at RNAS Roborough from 1623 (anti-aircraft co-operation) Flight. It was tasked with anti-aircraft co-operation duties in the Plymouth area operating a variety of aircraft in this role. Most of the work was to fly as training targets for Royal Navy ships. The squadron moved a number of times from the end of the war to RAF Exeter, RAF Weston Zoyland, RAF Fairwood Common, and finally to RAF Chivenor. Its existence ended there when it was renumbered to No. 17 Squadron RAF on 11 February 1949.

== Aircraft operated ==
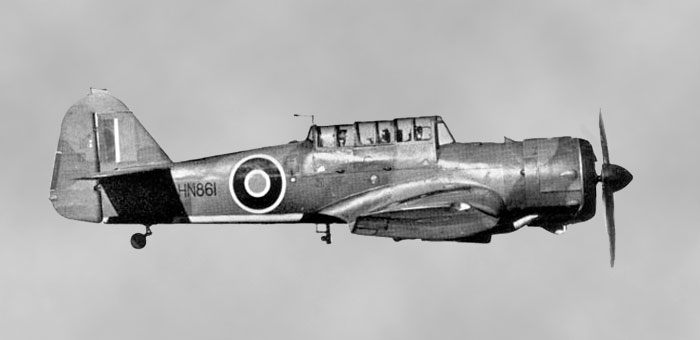
A Miles Martinet. Aircraft as this were used as target tug by no. 691 squadron

Aircraft operated by no. 691 Squadron RAF, data from
From	To	Aircraft	Variant
December 1943	March 1945	Fairey Barracuda	Mk.II
December 1943	April 1945	Boulton Paul Defiant	Mks.I & II
December 1943	March 1944	Hawker Hurricane	Mk.I
December 1943	February 1949	Airspeed Oxford	Mks. I & II
March 1944	April 1945	Hawker Hurricane	Mk.IIc
April 1945	May 1947	Vultee Vengeance	Mk.IV
July 1945	August 1945	Supermarine Spitfire	Mk.Vb
August 1945	February 1949	Miles Martinet	
August 1945	February 1949	Supermarine Spitfire	Mk.XVI
November 1945	February 1949	North American Harvard	Mk.IIb

== Squadron bases ==
Air bases and airfields used by no. 691 Squadron RAF, data from
From	To	Name	Remark
1 December 1943	21 February 1945	RNAS Roborough, Devon	Formed here
21 February 1945	1 August 1945	RAF Harrowbeer, Devon	
1 August 1945	31 January 1946	RAF Exeter, Devon	
31 January 1946	4 October 1946	RAF Fairwood Common, Glamorgan (now County of Swansea), Wales	
July 1946	4 October 1946	RAF Weston Zoyland, Somerset	Detachment
4 October 1946	11 February 1949	RAF Chivenor, Devon	Disbanded here

== See also ==
- List of Royal Air Force aircraft squadrons
