= 779 Naval Air Squadron =

Inactive flying squadron of the Royal Navy's Fleet Air Arm

- Squadron badge
- Active: 1941–1945
- Disbanded: 5 August 1945
- Country: United Kingdom
- Branch: Royal Navy
- Type: Fleet Air Arm Second Line Squadron
- Role: Fleet Requirements Unit
- Size: Squadron
- Part of: Fleet Air Arm
- Home station: RN Air Section Gibraltar
- Mottos: Finis coronat opus (Latin for 'The end crowns the work')
- Aircraft: See Aircraft operated section for full list.

Insignia
- Squadron Badge Description: Bendy of four gold and black, a roundle per fess white and green chief a triple-towered battlement proper base a key fesswise wards uppermost gold (1944)
- Identification Markings: single letters on some aircraft

779 Naval Air Squadron (779 NAS), also called 779 Squadron, is an inactive Fleet Air Arm (FAA) naval air squadron of the United Kingdom’s Royal Navy (RN). It was last operational as a Fleet Requirements Unit, from October 1941, at RN Air Section Gibraltar, located at RAF North Front, Gibraltar. It operated a small variety of aircraft for target towing and coastal defence. In 1943, the squadron received a number of Bristol Beaufighter aircraft and a detachment of these deployed to Taranto, after which they also saw service at various airbases around North Africa. It disbanded, during August 1945, at Gibraltar.

== History ==
=== Fleet Requirements Unit (1941–1945) ===
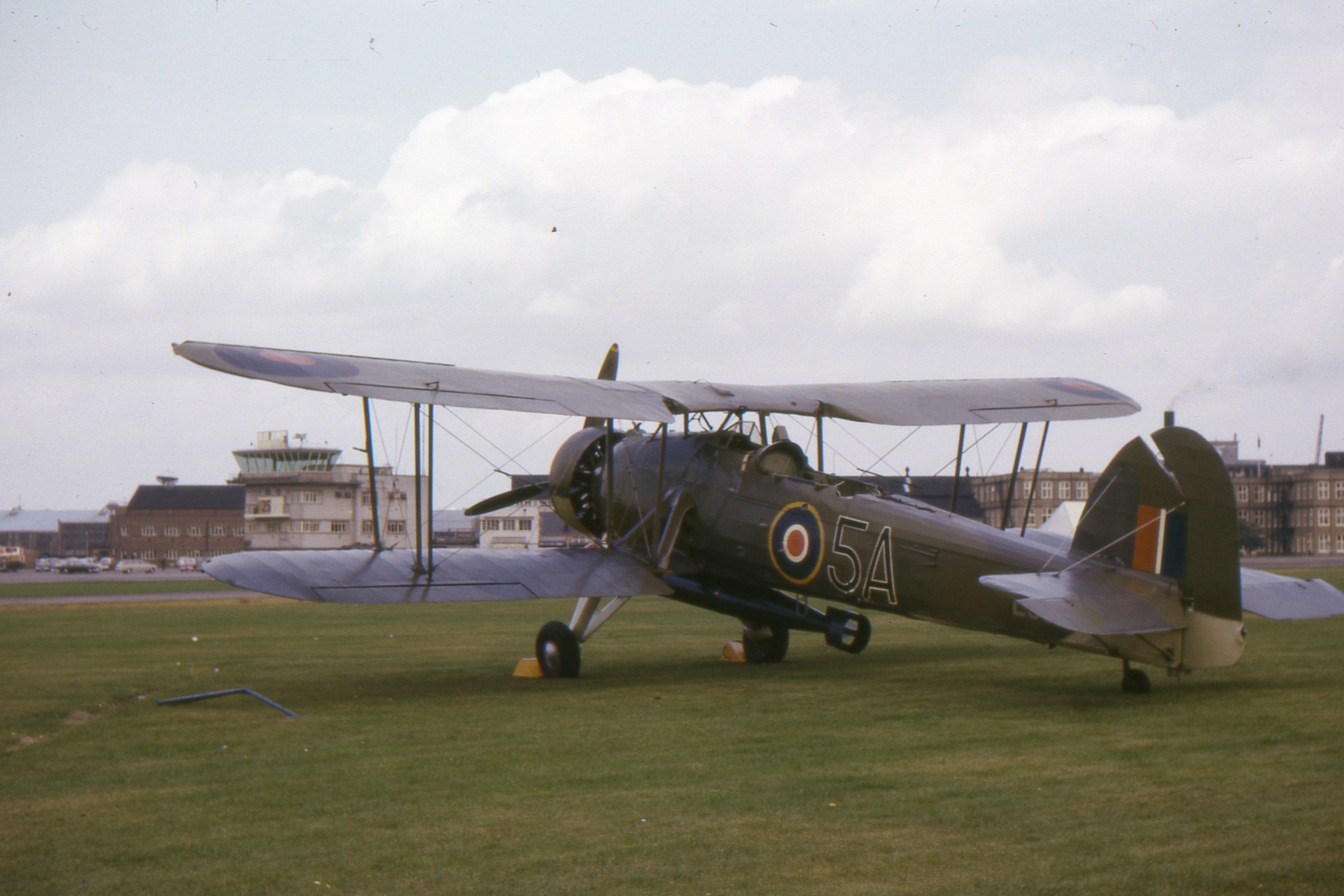
Fairey Swordfish Mk II

779 Naval Air Squadron formed as a Fleet Requirements Unit, on 1 October 1941, at RN Air Section Gibraltar (the Admiralty had lodger facilities at RAF North Front). It was Initially equipped with two Blackburn Skua, a carrier-based dive bomber and fighter aircraft, for target towing and coastal defence. Fairey Swordfish, a biplane torpedo bomber, Fairey Fulmar, a carrier-borne reconnaissance and fighter aircraft, and Hawker Sea Hurricane, a navalised version of the Hawker Hurricane fighter aircraft, were also used, but in April 1943, a target tug variant of the Boulton Paul Defiant interceptor aircraft replaced the Blackburn Skua aircraft.

Later in the year the squadron received a number of Bristol Beaufighter II, a multirole combat aircraft, and during September they formed a detachment at Taranto, Italy. Once this had finished they were then on numerous detachments around North Africa, including at R N Air Section Tafaraoui, RAF Oujda, Blida, Maison Blanche and La Senia. Miles Martinet target tug aircraft replaced the Boulton Paul Defiants in June 1944, and the squadron consisted two Fairey Swordfish, three Bristol Beaufighters, two Hawker Sea Hurricanes and nine Miles Martinets. 779 Naval Air Squadron disbanded at RN Air Section Gibraltar, North Front on 5 August 1945.

== Aircraft operated ==
The squadron operated a number of different aircraft types, including:

- Blackburn Skua Mk.II dive bomber / fighter aircraft (October 1941 - April 1943)
- Fairey Swordfish I torpedo bomber (October 1941 - August 1942)
- Fairey Swordfish II torpedo bomber (October 1941 - January 1945)
- Fairey Fulmar Mk.II reconnaissance/fighter aircraft (February 1942 - January 1943)
- Hawker Sea Hurricane Mk IB fighter aircraft (February 1942)
- Boulton Paul Defiant TT Mk III target tug (April 1943 - May 1944)
- Supermarine Seafire Mk Ib fighter aircraft (May 1943 - October 1944)
- Bristol Beaufighter Mk.IIF multirole combat aircraft (May 1943 - August 1945)
- Hawker Hurricane Mk.IIC fighter aircraft (May 1944 - April 1945)
- Miles Martinet TT.Mk I target tug (May 1944 - August 1945

== Naval air stations ==
779 Naval Air Squadron operated from a naval air station of the Royal Navy, overseas and number of other airbases:

- RN Air Section Gibraltar, Gibraltar, (1 October 1941 - 5 August 1945)
  - Taranto, Italy, (Detachment 18 - 22 September 1943)
  - Blida, Algeria, (Detachment 19 October 1943 - 12 October 1944)
  - RN Air Section Tafaraoui, Algeria, (Detachment 27 October 1943 - 21 May 1944)
  - Royal Air Force Oujda, Morocco, (Detachment 26 January - 16 February 1944)
  - Maison Blanche, Algeria, (Detachment 22 February - 23 May 1944)
  - La Senia, Algeria, (Detachment 3 March - 3 August 1944)
- disbanded - (5 August 1945)

== Commanding officers ==
List of commanding officers of 779 Naval Air Squadron with date of appointment:

- Lieutenant Commander(A) B.F. Cox, RNVR, from 1 October 1941
- Lieutenant Commander(A) L. Gilbert, RNVR, from 17 January 1942
- Lieutenant Commander(A) J.M. Keene-Miller, RNVR, from 22 June 42
- Lieutenant Commander(A) C.R. Holman, RNR, from 1 May 1943
- Lieutenant Commander(A) E.L. Meicklejohn, RNVR, from 14 September 1943
- disbanded - 5 August 1945

Note: Abbreviation (A) signifies Air Branch of the RN or RNVR.
