= No. 287 Squadron RAF =

- Active: 19 November 1941 – 15 June 1946
- Country: United Kingdom
- Branch: Royal Air Force
- Role: anti-aircraft co-operation
- Part of: No. 11 Group RAF, Fighter Command; No. 70 Group RAF, Fighter Command
- Motto(s): French: C'est en forgeant (Translation: "Practice makes perfect")

Insignia
- Squadron Badge heraldry: A popinjay displayed perched
- Squadron Codes: KZ (Nov 1941 – Jun 1946)

No. 287 Squadron was an anti-aircraft co-operation squadron of the Royal Air Force from 1941 to 1946.

== History ==
The squadron was formed at RAF Croydon on 19 November 1941 from No. 11 Group RAFs Anti-Aircraft Co-Operation Flight. The squadron flew various aircraft, including Westland Lysanders and Bristol Blenheims. Its role was to provide target towing and to carry out attack simulations during World War II. This was to enable continuation training for anti-aircraft units in the South of England. After spending a large period of time in Croydon, No. 287 Squadron moved to RAF North Weald in 1944, RAF Bradwell Bay in 1945 and RAF West Malling in September 1945. After Lysanders and Blenheims, the squadron began to develop its aircraft strength, taking on board Miles Masters, Boulton Paul Defiants and Airspeed Oxfords in 1942, Miles Martinets and Spitfire VB's in 1943, Bristol Beaufighters, Spitfire IX's and Tempest V's in 1944 and Spitfire XVI's in 1945. The squadron was disbanded on 15 June 1946.

== Aircraft operated ==
Aircraft operated by No. 287 Squadron RAF
From	To	Aircraft	Version
November 1941	January 1942	Bristol Blenheim	Mk.IV
November 1941	March 1942	Lockheed Hudson	Mk.III
November 1941	April 1942	Westland Lysander	Mk.III
November 1941	March 1945	Hawker Hurricane	Mks. I, IIb, IV
February 1942	August 1942	Miles Master	Mk.III
March 1942	October 1943	Boulton Paul Defiant	Mk.I
March 1942	June 1946	Airspeed Oxford	
January 1943	October 1943	Boulton Paul Defiant	Mk.III
July 1943	June 1946	Miles Martinet	
November 1943	March 1944	Supermarine Spitfire	Mk.Vb
September 1944	July 1945	Bristol Beaufighter	Mk.VI
November 1944	September 1945	Supermarine Spitfire	Mk.IX
November 1944	June 1946	Hawker Tempest	Mk.V
August 1945	June 1946	Supermarine Spitfire	Mk.XVI

== Squadron bases ==
Bases and airfields used by No. 287 Squadron RAF
From	To	Base	Remarks
19 November 1941	4 July 1944	RAF Croydon	Detachments at RAF Debden, RAF Hornchurch, RAF Merston, RAF Martlesham Heath, RAF Fairlop, RAF Biggin Hill, RAF Northolt, RAF Ipswich, RAF Ford, RAF Honiley, RAF Hunsdon, RAF Southend and RAF Farnborough
4 July 1944	27 August 1944	RAF North Weald	Detachments at RAF Farnborough and RAF Gatwick
27 August 1944	20 January 1945	RAF Gatwick	Detachment at RAF North Weald
20 January 1945	3 May 1945	RAF Redhill	Detachment at RAF North Weald
3 May 1945	15 June 1945	RAF Hornchurch	Detachments at RAF Hunsdon and RAF North Weald
15 June 1945	10 September 1945	RAF Bradwell Bay	
10 September 1945	15 June 1946	RAF West Malling	
