= 797 Naval Air Squadron =

Inactive flying squadron of the Royal Navy's Fleet Air Arm

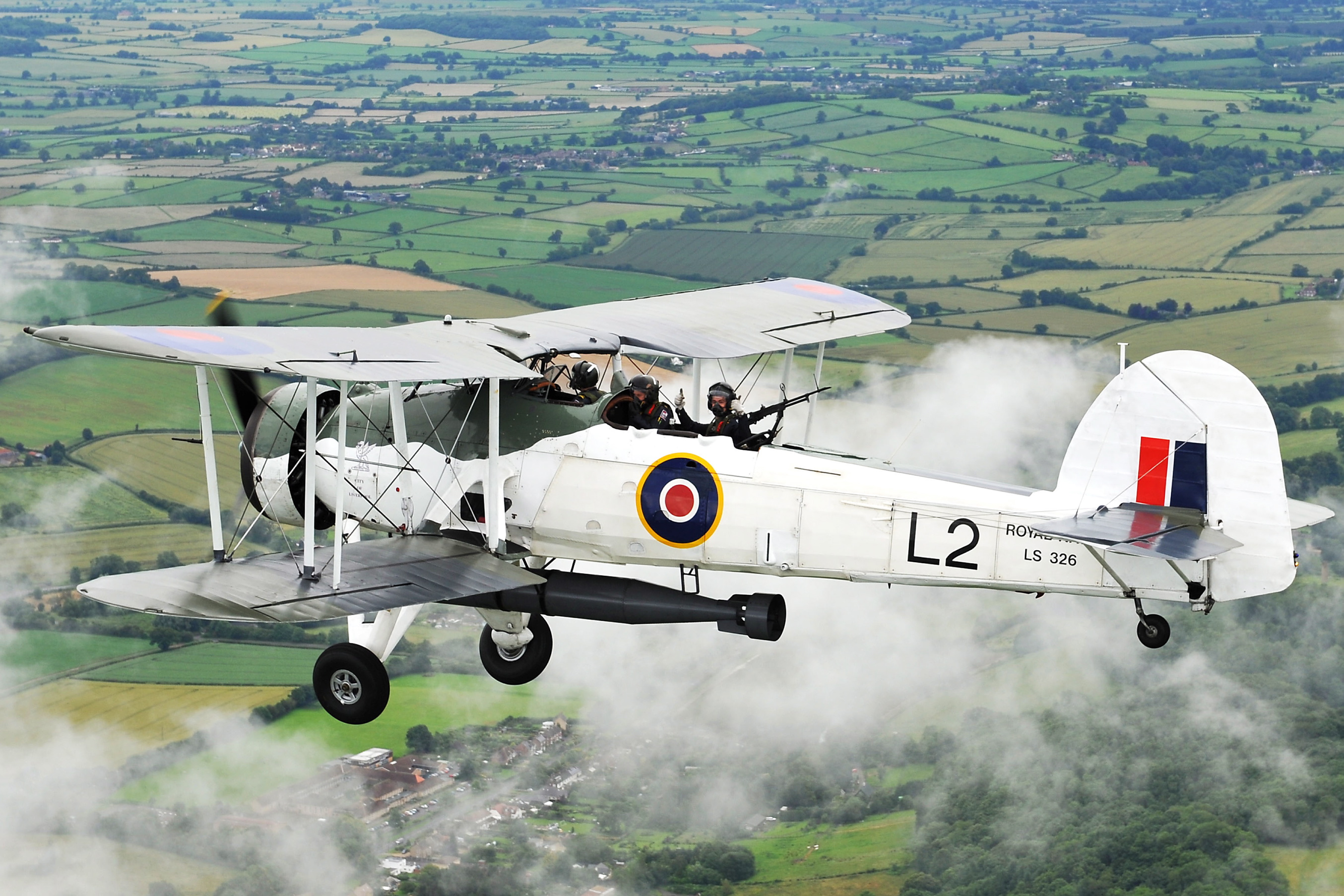
- Fairey Swordfish; an example of the type used by 797 NAS
- Active: 1942–1945
- Disbanded: 24 October 1945
- Country: United Kingdom
- Branch: Royal Navy
- Type: Fleet Air Arm Second Line Squadron
- Role: Fleet Requirements Unit
- Size: Squadron
- Part of: Fleet Air Arm
- Home station: See Naval air stations section for full list.
- Aircraft: See Aircraft flown section for full list.

Insignia
- Identification Markings: R8A+ (Defiant from 1944); L9A+ (Beaufighter later); L0A+ (later)

797 Naval Air Squadron (797 NAS), also known as 797 Squadron, is an inactive Fleet Air Arm (FAA) naval air squadron of the United Kingdom’s Royal Navy (RN) which last disbanded in October 1945 in Ceylon. Its role was a Fleet Requirements Unit.

It was formed at HMS Ukussa, Royal Naval Air Station Katukurunda, in Ceylon, in July 1942. The squadron moved to HMS Bherunda, RNAS Colombo Racecourse, in October 1943. It had a Communications Flight which became 742 Naval Air Squadron in December 1943 and the following summer it had an ‘X’ Flight deployed for target towing for a couple of gunnery schools in Bombay, India and which eventually moved to 722 Naval Air Squadron.

== History ==
=== Fleet Requirements Unit (1942-1945) ===
797 Naval Air Squadron formed at RNAS Katukurunda (HMS Ukussa), British Ceylon (Sri Lanka), in July 1942, it was initially equipped with two Blackburn Skua, a British carrier-based dive bomber/fighter aircraft. It was tasked as a Fleet Requirements Unit. Unit personnel included new arrivals, along with ground crew from the recently sunk aircraft carrier HMS Hermes. A small number of Gloster Sea Gladiator, a British biplane fighter aircraft and Fairey Swordfish, a biplane torpedo bomber, were also acquired in 1943, and Fairey Albacore biplane torpedo bomber aircraft were added later. The squadron relocated to RNAS Colombo Racecourse (HMS Bherunda), located within Colombo Racecourse, in the Cinnamon Gardens, Colombo, Ceylon, on 1 October 1943 and shortly afterwards the Blackburn Skua were withdrawn and replaced with Boulton Paul Defiant, a British interceptor aircraft.

In August 1943, three Beech AT-7 Navigator, a twin-engined trainer, transport and utility aircraft were received by the communications flight, which became 742 Naval Air Squadron during December 1943. On 1 July 1944, 'X' Flight was detached to Juhu. It was equipped with Fairey Swordfish which were used to tow targets and it operated in support of a Defensively Equipped Merchant Ship (DEMS) gunnery school at Colaba along with an Indian Navy gunnery school, at Malabar Point, in Bombay. In September this flight was absorbed by 722 Naval Air Squadron. In 1944 a considerable number of new aircraft were received, with North American Harvard, an American advanced trainer aircraft, Grumman Avenger, an American torpedo bomber aircraft, Fairey Barracuda, a British carrier-borne torpedo and dive bomber and Bristol Beaufighter, a twin-engine multirole combat aircraft, added to the squadron. In July 1945 the squadron briefly operated six de Havilland Mosquito, also a twin-engine multirole combat aircraft. 797 Naval Air Squadron disbanded on 24 October 1945.

== Aircraft flown ==
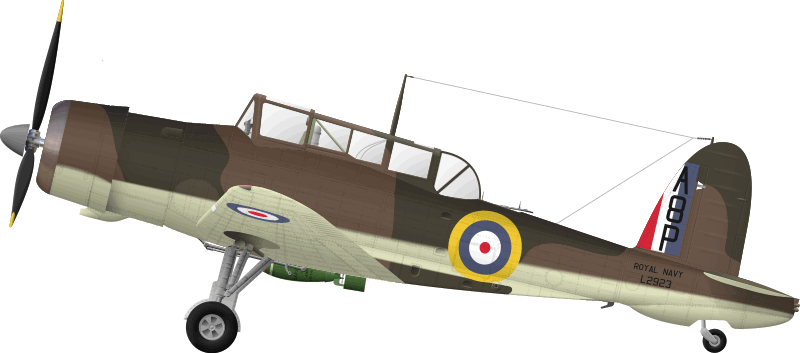
Blackburn Skua L2923 in Fleet Air Arm markings

The squadron has flown a number of different aircraft types, including:

- Blackburn Skua dive bomber/fighter (July 1942 - November 1943)
- Fairey Swordfish I torpedo bomber (November 1942 - August 1945)
- Fairey Albacore torpedo bomber (April - October 1943)
- Gloster Sea Gladiator biplane fighter (May 1943)
- Beech AT-7 Navigator trainer, transport & utility aircraft (August - December 1943)
- Boulton Paul Defiant fighter, night fighter, trainer, target tug (November 1943 - August 1945)
- North American Harvard III advanced trainer aircraft (January 1944)
- Grumman Tarpon GR.I torpedo bomber (March - May 1944)
- Bristol Beaufighter Mk.IIF multi-role aircraft (March 1944 - August 1945)
- Miles Martinet TT.Mk I target tug (September - October 1944)
- Fairey Barracuda Mk II torpedo bomber, dive bomber (November 1944)
- Vought Corsair Mk III fighter aircraft (January 1945)
- de Havilland Mosquito B Mk.25 bomber (July 1945)

== Naval air stations ==
797 Naval Air Squadron operated from a number of naval air stations of the Royal Navy, overseas:

- Royal Naval Air Station Katukurunda (HMS Ukussa), Ceylon, (by 24 July 1942 - 1 October 1943)
- Royal Naval Air Station Colombo Racecourse (HMS Bherunda), Ceylon, (1 October 1943 - 24 October 1945)
  - 'X' Flight: Royal Air Force Juhu, India, (1 July 1944, to 722 Naval Air Squadron 7 September 1944)
- disbanded - 24 October 1945

== Commanding officers ==
List of commanding officers of 797 Naval Air Squadron with date of appointment:

- Lieutenant(A) F.L. Page, RNVR, from July 1942
- Lieutenant(A) K.C. Winstanley, RNVR, from December 1943
- disbanded - 24 October 1945

Note: Abbreviation (A) signifies Air Branch of the RN or RNVR.
