= 789 Naval Air Squadron =

Inactive flying squadron of the Royal Navy's Fleet Air Arm

- Squadron badge
- Active: 1942–1945
- Disbanded: 25 November 1945
- Country: United Kingdom
- Branch: Royal Navy
- Type: Fleet Air Arm Second Line Squadron
- Role: Fleet Requirements Unit
- Size: Squadron
- Part of: Fleet Air Arm
- Home station: RNAS Wingfield
- Mottos: Ex culta robur (Latin for 'Strength from culture')
- Aircraft: See Aircraft flown section for full list.

Insignia
- Squadron Badge Description: Wartime unofficial, heraldic description lacking
- Identification Markings: AA+ (Fulmar) (single letter all other types); W8A+ & W9A+ (from 1943)

789 Naval Air Squadron (789 NAS), also called 789 Squadron, is an inactive Fleet Air Arm (FAA) naval air squadron of the United Kingdom's Royal Navy (RN) which last disbanded in November 1945.

789 Naval Air Squadron formed as a Fleet Requirements Unit at RNARY Wingfield (HMS Malagas) in South Africa, at the beginning of July 1942. It initially only had a single Supermarine Walrus, needing to borrow other aircraft types.

1943 saw the squadron sharing and holding aircraft for other Fleet Air Arm units and it wasn't until 1944 it started to receive a notable number of its own aircraft. It operated a wide variety including Avro Anson I, Bristol Beaufighter Mk.IIF, Boulton Paul Defiant TT Mk I, North American Harvard, Vought Kingfisher and Miles Martinet TT.Mk I.

== History ==
=== Fleet Requirements Unit (1942-1945) ===
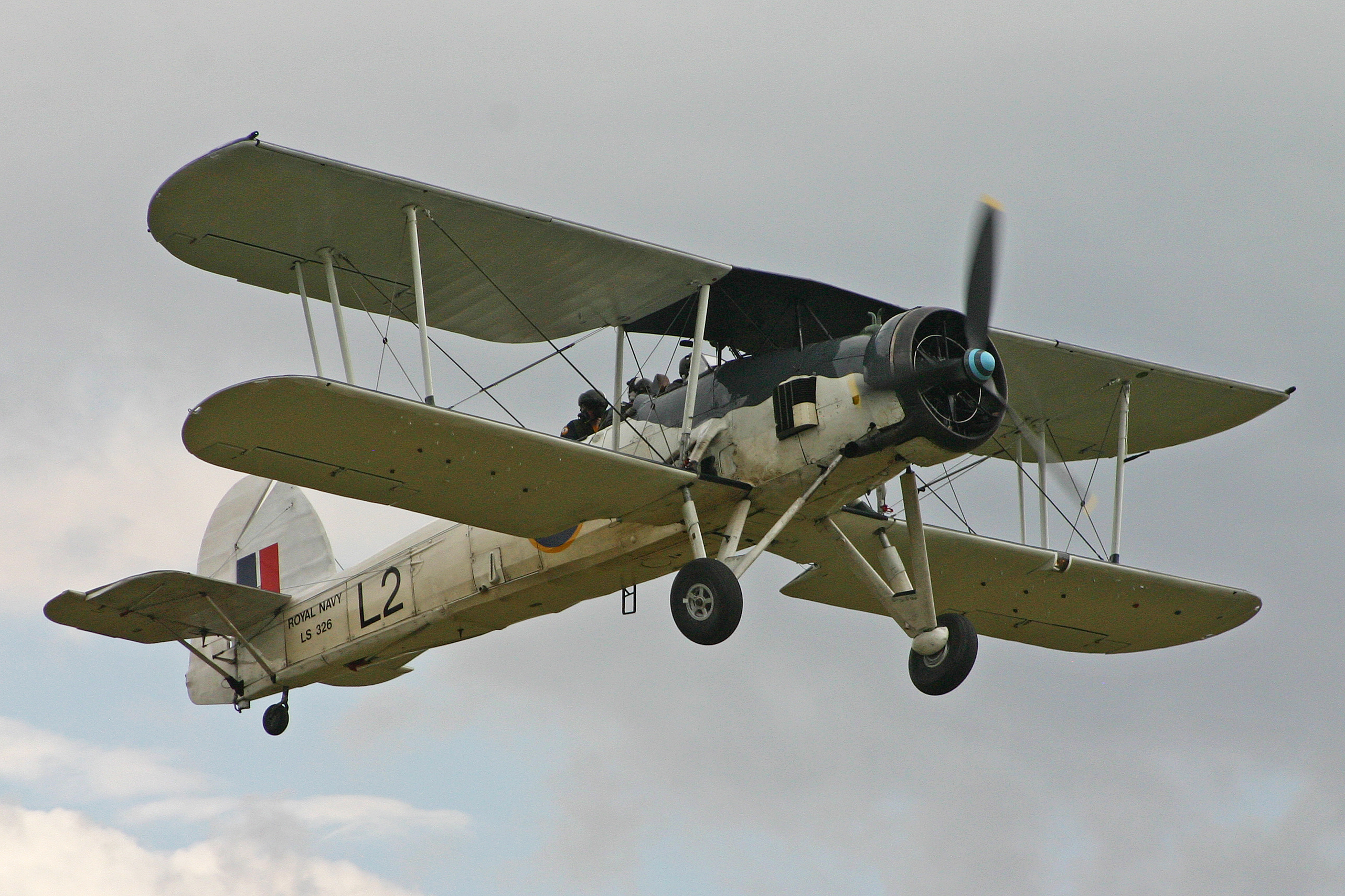
Fairey Swordfish II 'LS326' - L2, an example of the type used by 789 NAS

789 Naval Air Squadron formed on 1 July 1942 as a fleet requirements unit, at RNARY Wingfield (HMS Malagas), in Cape Town, South Africa. Initial aircraft consisted of a single Supermarine Walrus amphibious maritime patrol aircraft, but other aircraft were 'borrowed', including Fairey Albacore, a biplane torpedo bomber, Fairey Fulmar, a carrier-borne reconnaissance and fighter aircraft, Hawker Sea Hurricane, a navalised version of the Hawker Hurricane single-engine fighter aircraft and Fairey Swordfish, a biplane torpedo bomber. The squadron's role was to support the training of Allied warships with aircraft, but it also undertook operational coastal patrols. A couple of Blackburn Skua, a carrier-based dive bomber / fighter aircraft, were acquired during September 1943 and some Vought Kingfisher, an observation floatplane, were held for 703 Naval Air Squadron by late 1943 and from October it began sharing Fairey Albacore, a single-engine biplane torpedo bomber, with 799 Naval Air Squadron, which was a Torpedo Bomber Reconnaissance pool.

In early 1944 the squadron began to receive more of its own aircraft when it acquired four Boulton Paul Defiant target tug variant. Later in the year these were augmented with Miles Martinet target tug aircraft and additionally the squadron received Avro Anson, a twin-engine multi-role aircraft, Bristol Beaufighter, a twin-engine multi-role aircraft and North American Harvard, an American advanced trainer aircraft. 789 Naval Air Squadron disbanded at RNARY Wingfield on 25 November 1945.

== Aircraft flown ==
The squadron has operated a number of different aircraft types, including:

- Fairey Swordfish I torpedo bomber (July 1942 - June 1943)
- Fairey Albacore torpedo bomber (July 1942 - September 1944)
- Supermarine Walrus amphibious maritime patrol aircraft (July 1942 - December 1944)
- Hawker Sea Hurricane Mk IB fighter aircraft (July 1942 - )
- Fairey Swordfish II torpedo bomber (October 1942 - November 1945)
- Blackburn Roc TT target tug (1943)
- Fairey Fulmar Mk.II reconnaissance/fighter aircraft (May - July 1943)
- Vought Kingfisher I observation floatplane (November 1943 - February 1944)
- Boulton Paul Defiant TT Mk I target tug (February - December 1944)
- Miles Martinet TT.Mk 1 target tug (September 1944 - November 1945)
- Avro Anson Mk I multi-role trainer aircraft (September 1944 - November 1945)
- Bristol Beaufighter Mk.IIF night fighter (September 1944 - November 1945)
- North American Harvard IIA advanced trainer (September 1944 - November 1945)
- Airspeed Oxford training aircraft (February - August 1945)
- North American Harvard III advanced trainer (February - November 1945)

== Naval air stations ==
789 Naval Air Squadron operated from a single naval air station of the Royal Navy, located overseas:

- Royal Naval Aircraft Repair Yard Wingfield (HMS Malagas), Cape Town, South Africa, (1 July 1942 - 25 November 1945)
- disbanded - (25 November 1945)

== Commanding officers ==
List of commanding officers of 789 Naval Air Squadron, with date month of appointment:

- Lieutenant Commander(A) K.C. Johnson, RNVR, from 1 July 1942
- Lieutenant Commander(A) W.T.E. White, SANF (V), from 11 June 1943
- Lieutenant(A) B. Sinclair, MBE, RN, from 10 September 1943
- Lieutenant Commander W.T.E. White, SANF (V), from 20 June 1944
- disbanded - 25 November 1945

Note: Abbreviation (A) signifies Air Branch of the RN or RNVR.
