= No. 290 Squadron RAF =

Defunct flying squadron of the Royal Air Force

- Active: 1 December 1943 – 27 October 1945
- Country: United Kingdom
- Branch: Royal Air Force
- Motto(s): None

Insignia
- Squadron Badge: None
- Squadron Code: X6 (December 1943 – October 1945)

No. 290 Squadron RAF was a Royal Air Force Squadron formed as an anti-aircraft cooperation unit in World War II.

== History ==
No. 290 Squadron formed at Newtownards on 1 December 1943 and was equipped with Hurricanes, Oxfords and Martinets to provide practice for the anti-aircraft defences in Northern Ireland by towing targets and conducting simulated attacks. The squadron moved to West Freugh, Scotland and then to Knocke le Zout, Belgium where it disbanded on 27 October 1945.

== Aircraft operated ==
Aircraft operated by No. 290 Squadron
From	To	Aircraft	Variant
Dec 1943	Jan 1945	Hawker Hurricane	IIC
Dec 1943	Oct 1945	Airspeed Oxford	
Dec 1943	Oct 1945	Miles Martinet	
Dec 1944	Oct 1945	Supermarine Spitfire	VB
