= Tambaram Air Force Station =

Airfield of the Indian Air Force in Chennai

Tambaram Air Force Station தாம்பரம் விமானப்படை நிலையம்
- IATA: none; ICAO: VOTX

Summary
- Airport type: Military
- Operator: Indian Air Force
- Location: Tambaram, Chennai, Tamil Nadu
- Elevation AMSL: 27 m / 90 ft
- Coordinates: 12°54′25″N 80°07′16″E
- Interactive map of Tambaram Air Force Station

Runways
Direction	Length		Surface
Direction	m	ft	Surface
05/23	1,513	4,965	Asphalt
12/30	1,818	5,965	Asphalt

Tambaram Air Force Station is an Indian Air Force airfield in Tambaram, Chennai, Tamil Nadu, India. This Air Force station is primarily involved in the training of pilots as Qualified Flying Instructors and Mechanical Training Institute for airmen.

It was founded as RAF Tambaram, initially operated by the Royal Air Force (hence its name) and the Royal Indian Air Force during the Second World War. After Indian independence in 1947 and the withdrawal of British forces and the RAF from India, it became RIAF Station Tambaram and finally IAF Station Tambaram following India's becoming of a republic in 1950.

The station has a squadron of 15 Pilatus PC-7 Mk II basic trainers by 2015 at the Flying Instructors School. The PC-7 will join a fleet that comprises Kiran Mk I and Mk II trainer aircraft, and HAL Cheetah and HAL Chetak helicopters. An An-32 transport squadron is stationed here. Apart from training, helicopters from the Indian Navy have also been operated from this airfield.

In 2017, the Indian Air Force proposed to lengthen the runway so that larger aircraft could land to assist with natural disasters.

== Use by smaller civilian aircraft ==
There are plans to use the air force station to handle smaller civilian ATR aircraft (with a capacity of 70 to 80 passengers) to decongest the Chennai International Airport.

== Incidents ==
- On 15 July 1990, an Indian Air Force An-32 crashed in the Ponmudi Mountain Range while en route from Tambaram Air Force Station to Thiruvananthapuram in India.
- On 2 June 1997, a Saudi Arabian Airlines Boeing 747 operating a flight from Riyadh to India mistakenly landed at the Indian Air Force base in Tambaram instead of its intended destination, Chennai (then Madras) International Airport. The crew aligned with and touched down on the military runway without incident, and all passengers and crew disembarked safely with no reported injuries. Because Tambaram’s runway is shorter and more constrained than that of Chennai International Airport, the 747 could not simply depart using standard procedures. Airline engineers and ground personnel, working with Indian Air Force authorities, arranged to reduce the aircraft’s weight by offloading fuel and other load, and conducted detailed performance planning, including takeoff distance calculations, obstacle clearance analysis, and contingency procedures. Once the runway and surrounding airspace were secured and the aircraft was confirmed to be within safe operating limits for the available runway length, the 747 carried out a carefully managed takeoff from Tambaram and then flew a brief repositioning leg to Chennai International Airport.

== See also ==
- Chennai International Airport
- List of Indian Air Force Bases
