= 727 Naval Air Squadron =

Flying squadron of the Royal Navy's Fleet Air Arm

- 727 NAS Badge
- Active: 1943–1944; 1946–1950; 1956–1960; 2001–present
- Country: United Kingdom
- Branch: Royal Navy
- Type: Fleet Air Arm Second Line Squadron
- Role: Fleet Requirements Unit; Air Experience Unit; Dartmouth Cadet Air Training Squadron; RN Grading Flight
- Size: Five aircraft
- Part of: Fleet Air Arm
- Home station: RNAS Yeovilton
- Mottos: Regere mare, regite caelum (Latin for 'To rule the sea one must rule the sky')
- Aircraft: Grob Tutor T1
- Website: Official website

Commanders
- Current commander: Lieutenant Commander Chris Rebbeck, RN

Insignia
- Squadron Badge Description: Per fess white and barry wavy of six blue and white, the head of Britannia proper helmeted gold (1956)
- Identification Markings: single letters (All types); GP2A+ (All types from January 1946); 210-239 (All types from September 1947); GP2+ (Harvard); 201-202 (Harvard from September 1947); 555-568 (Sea Prince/Sea Vampire/Sea Balliol/Dragonfly)
- Fin Shore Code: GJ (All types from September 1947); BY (Sea Prince/Sea Vampire/Sea Balliol/Dragonfly)

727 Naval Air Squadron (727 NAS), also known as 727 Squadron, is a Fleet Air Arm (FAA) naval air squadron of the United Kingdom’s Royal Navy (RN). It operates the Grob Tutor T1 basic trainer aircraft, based at RNAS Yeovilton in Somerset. The squadron conducts pilot grading and related fixed-wing training for Royal Navy and other Defence personnel.

Originally formed at RN Air Section Gibraltar, in 1943 as a Fleet Requirements Unit, it conducted target-towing and air-training duties during the Second World War before being disbanded in 1944. It was reformed in 1946 to provide flying experience for junior Royal Navy and Royal Marines officers, and again in 1956 as the Dartmouth Cadet Air Training Squadron. After its disbandment in 1960, its flying-grading role continued at Roborough Airport near Plymouth, where de Havilland Tiger Moths, de Havilland Chipmunks and later Grob aircraft were used to assess prospective naval aviators. The grading organisation was re-formed as 727 Naval Air Squadron in 2001 and moved to RNAS Yeovilton in 2006.

== History ==
=== Fleet Requirements Unit (1943-1944) ===
727 Naval Air Squadron was formed at RN Air Section Gibraltar (HMS Cormorant II), at RAF North Front, Gibraltar, on 26 May 1943 as a Fleet Requirements Unit, initially equipped with six Boulton Paul Defiant target tugs. Detachments were established at RN Air Section Tafaraoui at RAF Tafaraoui and RAF Blida in Algeria, where the squadron conducted sleeve-target, air-training and dummy fighter-attack exercises for Allied armies, navies and air forces. The Defiants were supplemented by a small number of Fairey Swordfish torpedo bombers, while some Royal Air Force Hawker Hurricane fighter aircraft were also loaned to the squadron.

In November 1944 the squadron moved to RAF Ta Kali, Malta, where it was disbanded on 7 December.

=== Air Experience Unit (1946-1960) ===
727 Squadron reformed at RNAS Gosport on 23 April 1946 from 'B' Flight of 799 Naval Air Squadron, providing air courses for non-flying junior Royal Navy and Royal Marines officers.

Its equipment consisted mainly of 18 de Havilland Tiger Moths; a Supermarine Seafire fighter aircraft was initially also on strength, later replaced by one and then two North American Harvard advanced trainer aircraft. A Fairey Firefly FR.Mk 4 fighter-reconnaissance aircraft was added in November 1948, and glider flying was also undertaken.

The squadron disbanded on 17 January 1950.

=== Dartmouth Cadet Air Training Squadron (1956–1960) ===
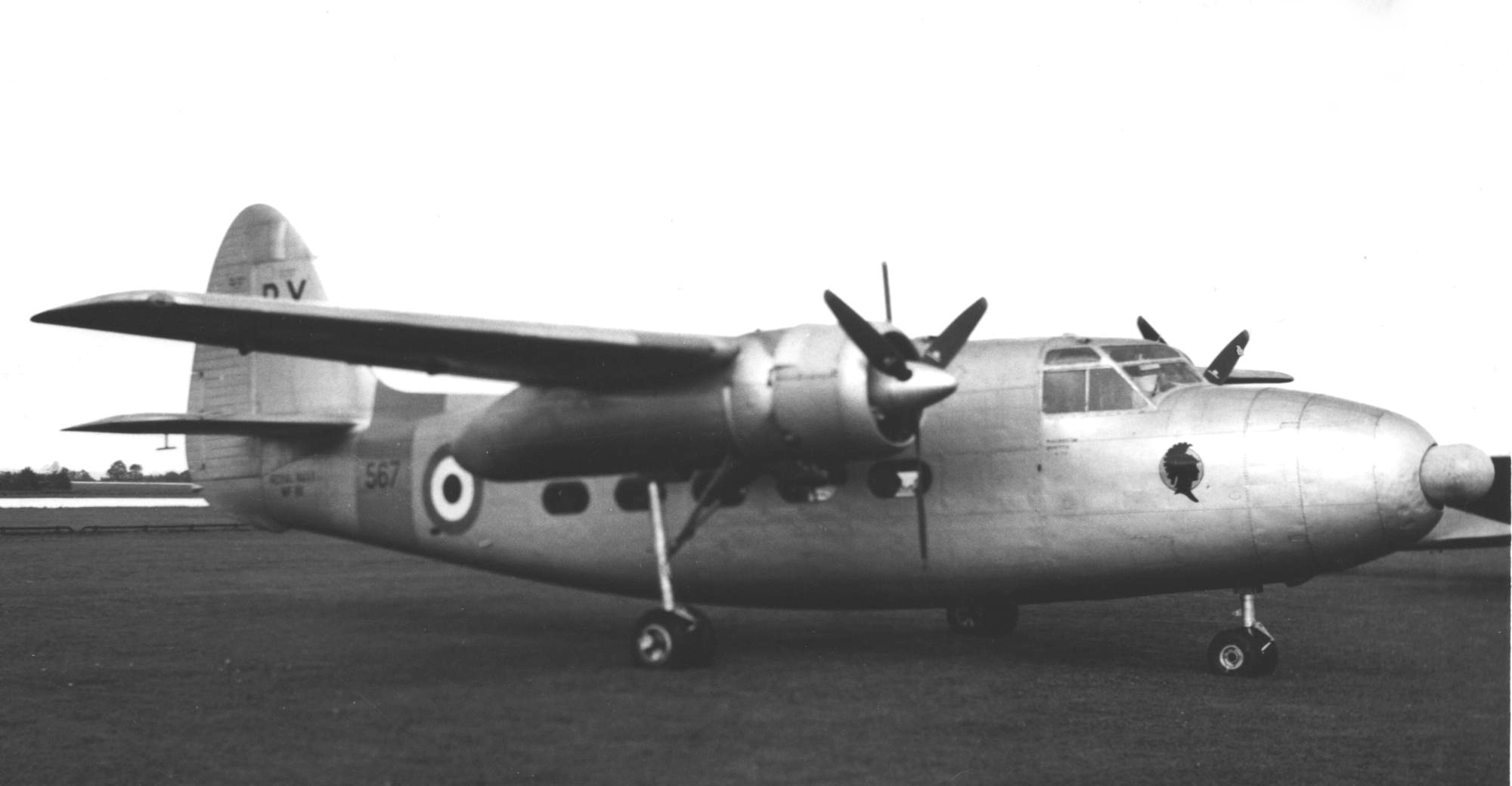
Percival Sea Prince T.1 'WF118' of 727 Squadron, RNAS Brawdy

727 Squadron reformed at RNAS Brawdy, Pembrokeshire, on 4 January 1956 as the Dartmouth Cadet Air Training Squadron, replacing the ship's flight of the colossus-class light aircraft carrier HMS Triumph after the training carrier was decommissioned. Its task was to provide air experience for non-flying junior officers.

The squadron operated Boulton Paul Sea Balliol advanced trainers, de Havilland Sea Vampire jet fighters and a Percival Sea Prince light transport aircraft, with a de Havilland Sea Devon, a short-haul airliner, also appearing on strength in late 1959 and early 1960.

From September 1958 the squadron also operated two Westland Dragonfly HR.5 air-sea search and rescue helicopters. These were transferred to the Britannia Helicopter Flight in June 1960, and 727 Squadron was disbanded at RNAS Brawdy on 16 December 1960.

=== Britannia Flight and the grading organisation ===
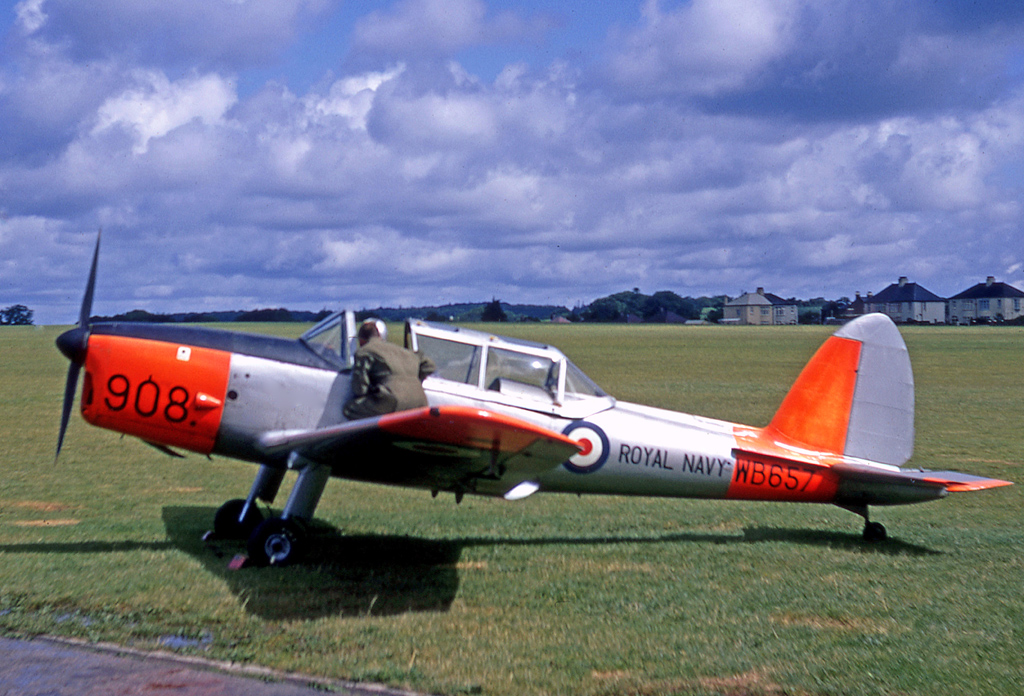
de Havilland Chipmunk of the Britannia Flight at Plymouth in 1969

Following the disbandment of 727 Squadron, the Royal Navy's flying-grading activity continued at Roborough Airport near Plymouth. Britannia Flight was formed there on 14 June 1960, close to the Britannia Royal Naval College at Dartmouth, and was operated by Airwork Services. The flight used de Havilland Tiger Moths until 1966, when they were replaced by de Havilland Chipmunks.

The grading organisation expanded as the assessment of prospective naval aircrew became its primary task. A contemporary Royal Navy account states that the number of aircraft had risen to seven when flying grading was introduced and that, by the end of 1966, the operation was using 12 Chipmunks. The grading operation remained based at Roborough for the following decades. In 1994 the Chipmunks were replaced by five Grob G.115 Heron basic trainers.

=== RN Grading Flight re-commissioned as 727 Naval Air Squadron (2001–present) ===
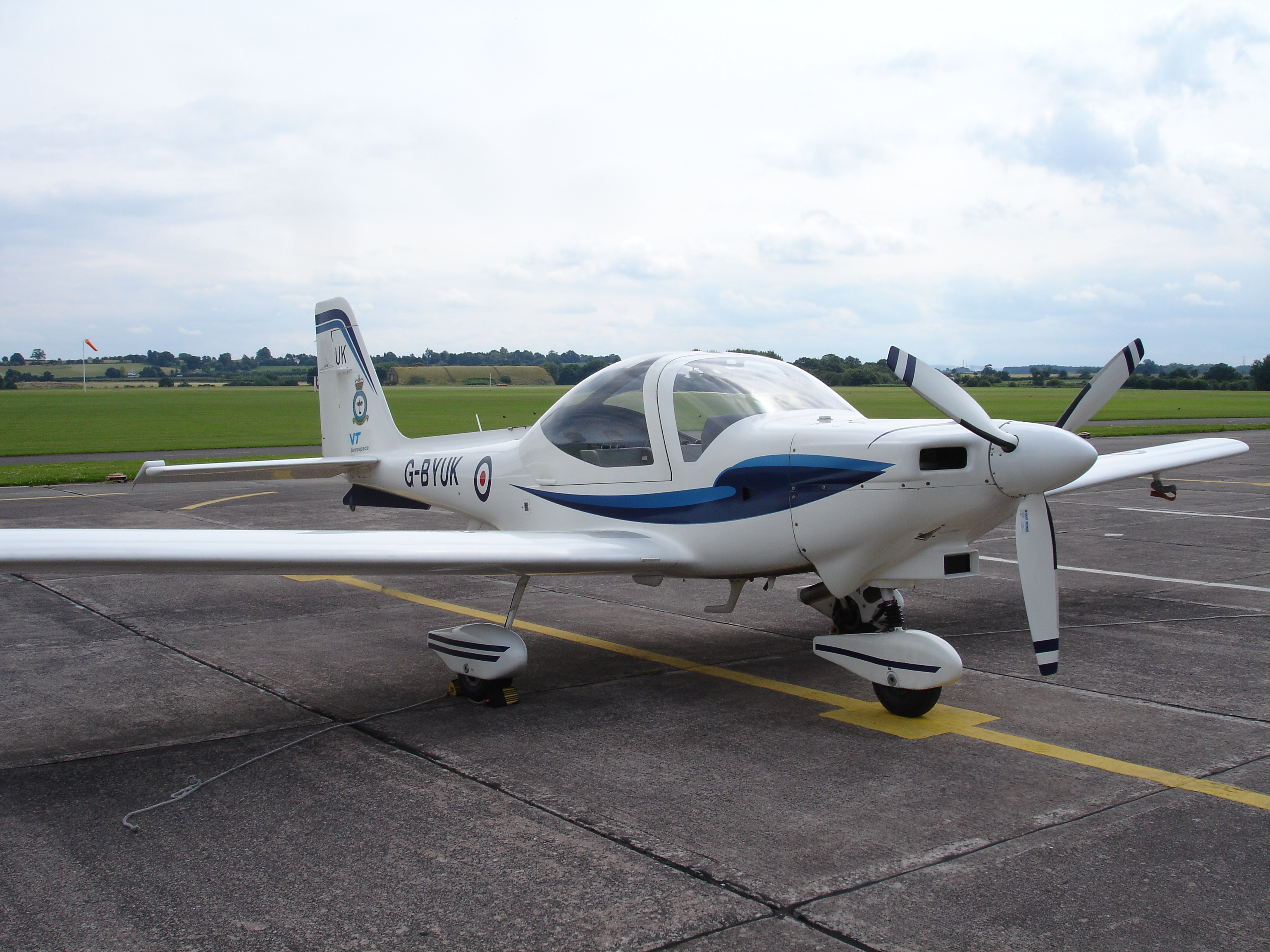
Grob Tutor T1

On 6 December 2001, 727 Squadron reformed at Roborough from the Naval Grading Flight. The squadron was tasked with pilot grading, fixed-wing refresher flying and conversion training, Royal Marines aircrew training, the Royal Navy Special Flying Awards scheme, University Royal Naval Air Squadron air experience and flying training, and aircrew recruiting.

The reformed squadron was equipped with five civil-registered Grob G.115D Heron trainers, with flying and maintenance initially undertaken under contract by VT Aerospace and subsequently by Babcock. It began re-equipping with ex-RAF Grob G.115E Tutor training aircraft in March 2004. The squadron moved from Roborough to RNAS Yeovilton in December 2006.

== Aircraft flown ==
The squadron has flown a variety of aircraft, including:

- Boulton Paul Defiant TT Mk I target tug (May 1943 – December 1944)
- Fairey Swordfish II torpedo bomber (May 1943 – December 1944)
- Hawker Hurricane Mk IIC fighter aircraft (June 1943 – December 1944)
- de Havilland Tiger Moth trainer aircraft (April 1946 – January 1950)
- Supermarine Seafire F Mk.XVII fighter aircraft (April 1946 – 1947)
- North American Harvard IIA advanced training aircraft (June - July 1947)
- Airspeed Oxford training aircraft (July - August 1947)
- North American Harvard IIB advanced training aircraft (July 1947 – January 1950)
- North American Harvard III advanced training aircraft (July 1947 – January 1950)
- Fairey Firefly FR.Mk 4 fighter/reconnaissance aircraft (November 1948 – January 1950)
- Boulton Paul Sea Balliol T.Mk 21 trainer aircraft (January 1956 – December 1960)
- de Havilland Sea Vampire T.22 jet trainer aircraft (January 1956 – December 1960)
- Percival Sea Prince T1 training aircraft (January 1956 – December 1960)
- Westland Dragonfly HR.5 air-sea search and rescue helicopter (September 1958 – June 1960)
- de Havilland Sea Devon C Mk 20 transport and communications aircraft (November 1959 – January 1960)
- Grob Heron basic trainer aircraft (December 2001 – March 2004)
- Grob Tutor T1 basic trainer aircraft (March 2004 – present)

== Naval air stations ==
727 Naval Air Squadron was active at various naval air stations of the Royal Navy and Royal Air Force stations, both within the United Kingdom and internationally:

1943 - 1945

- RN Air Section Gibraltar (HMS Cormorant II), Gibraltar, (26 May 1943 – 1 November 1944)
  - RN Air Section Tafaraoui, Algeria, (detachment from 26 May 1943)
  - Royal Air Force Blida, Algeria, (detachment from 26 May 1943)
- Royal Air Force Ta Kali, Malta, (1 November – 7 December 1944)
- disbanded – 7 December 1944

1946 - 1950

- Royal Naval Air Station Gosport (HMS Siskin), Hampshire, (23 April 1946 – 17 January 1950)
- disbanded – 17 January 1950

1956 - 1960

- Royal Naval Air Station Brawdy (HMS Goldcrest), Pembrokeshire, (4 January 1956 – 16 December 1960)
- disbanded – 16 December 1960

2001 - present

- Roborough Airport, Plymouth, (6 December 2001 – 5 December 2006)
- Royal Naval Air Station Yeovilton (HMS Heron), Somerset, (5 December 2006 – present)

== Commanding officers ==
List of commanding officers of 727 Naval Air Squadron, with dates of appointment:

1943 - 1944

- Lieutenant(A) E.L. Meiklejohn, RNVR, from 26 May 1943
- Lieutenant Commander(A) M.V. Dyas, RNVR, from 1 October 1943
- disbanded - 1 December 1944

1946 - 1950

- Lieutenant(A) M. Ogilvy, RN, from 23 April 1946
- Lieutenant A.M. Dennis, RN, from 23 July 1946
- Lieutenant(A) R.B. Lunberg, RN, from 10 January 1947
- Lieutenant W.E. Cotton, RN, from 15 November 1948
- disbanded - 17 January 1950

1956 - 1960

- Lieutenant Commander H.E.R. Bain, RN, from 4 January 1956
- Lieutenant Commander R.C. Fluker, RN, from 4 May 1957
- Lieutenant Commander D.A. MacNaughton, DSC, RN, from 10 May 1957
- Lieutenant Commander M.A. Tibby, RN, from 18 June 1957
- Lieutenant Commander P. L. Keighley-Peach, RN, from 6 September 1958
- Lieutenant Commander D.G. Halliday, RN, from 13 June 1959
- disbanded – 16 December 1960

2001 – present

- Lieutenant Commander N. Armstrong, RN, from 6 December 2001
- Lieutenant Commander G. Allison, RN, by August 2012
- Lieutenant Commander J. Ashlin, RN, by September 2017
- Lieutenant Commander J. Flintham, RN, by February 2023
- Lieutenant Commander C. Rebbeck, RN, present

Note: Abbreviation (A) signifies Air Branch of the RN or RNVR.
