= Airspeed Oxford =

1937 training aircraft by Airspeed

AS.10 Oxford
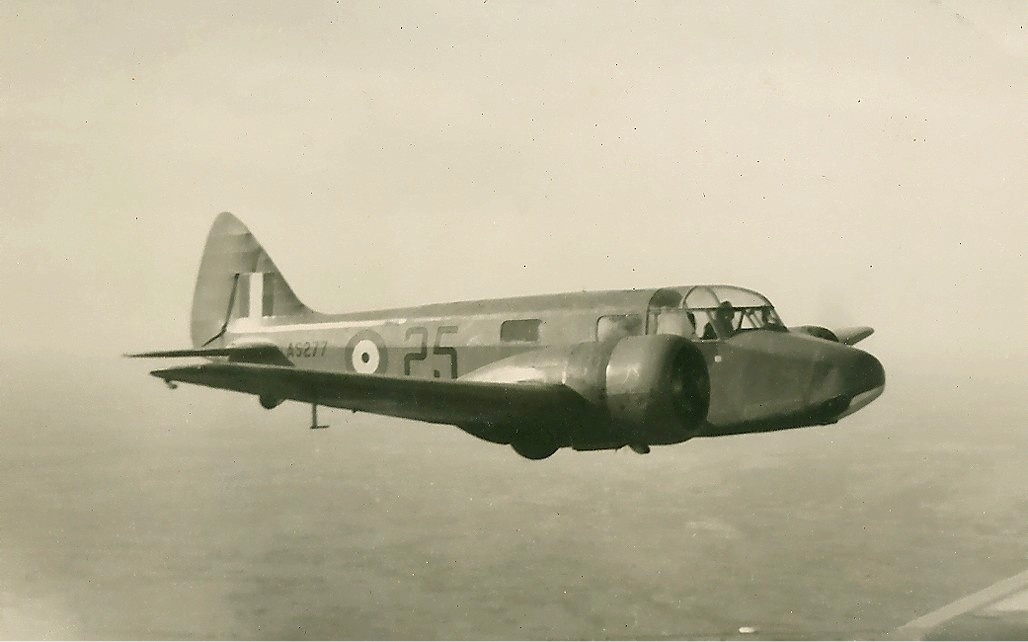
- Oxford II in flight over Saskatchewan, Canada in 1942

General information
- Type: Training aircraft
- Manufacturer: Airspeed Ltd.
- Status: Out of production, out of service
- Primary user: Royal Air Force
- Number built: 8,751

History
- First flight: 19 June 1937
- Developed from: Airspeed Envoy
- Variant: Airspeed Consul

The Airspeed AS.10 Oxford is a twin-engine monoplane aircraft developed and manufactured by Airspeed. It saw widespread use for training British Commonwealth aircrews in navigation, radio-operating, bombing and gunnery roles throughout the Second World War.

The Oxford was developed by Airspeed during the 1930s in response to a requirement for a trainer aircraft that conformed with Specification T.23/36, which had been issued by the British Air Ministry. Its basic design is derived from the company's earlier AS.6 Envoy, a commercial passenger aircraft. After its maiden flight by Percy Colman on 19 June 1937, it was quickly put into production as part of a rapid expansion of the Royal Air Force (RAF) in anticipation of a large-scale conflict.

As a consequence of the outbreak of war, many thousands of Oxfords were ordered by Britain and its allies, including Australia, Canada, France, New Zealand, Poland, and the United States. Following the end of the conflict, the Oxford continued to achieve export sales for some time, equipping the newly formed air forces of Egypt, India, Israel, and Yugoslavia. It was considered to be a capable trainer aircraft throughout the conflict, as well as being used as a general-purpose type. A number of Oxfords are preserved today on static display worldwide.

== Background ==
During the 1930s, a major expansion of the Royal Air Force (RAF) had been directed by the British government, which led to the formulation and issuing of a number of operational requirements by the Air Ministry. One of these was Operational Requirement 42 (OR.42), which sought an advanced training aircraft for aircrew who would serve on bomber aircraft. As the RAF was in the process of changing from biplanes to monoplanes, which were capable of greater speeds and had more demanding flight characteristics, a suitable trainer was needed to serve this change. At one point the Avro Anson was considered for the role; however, it was thought that an aircraft which was more difficult to fly would be necessary. Accordingly, on 10 July 1936, Specification T.23/36 was issued to Airspeed for the development of a twin-engined training aircraft to meet OR.42.

== Development ==
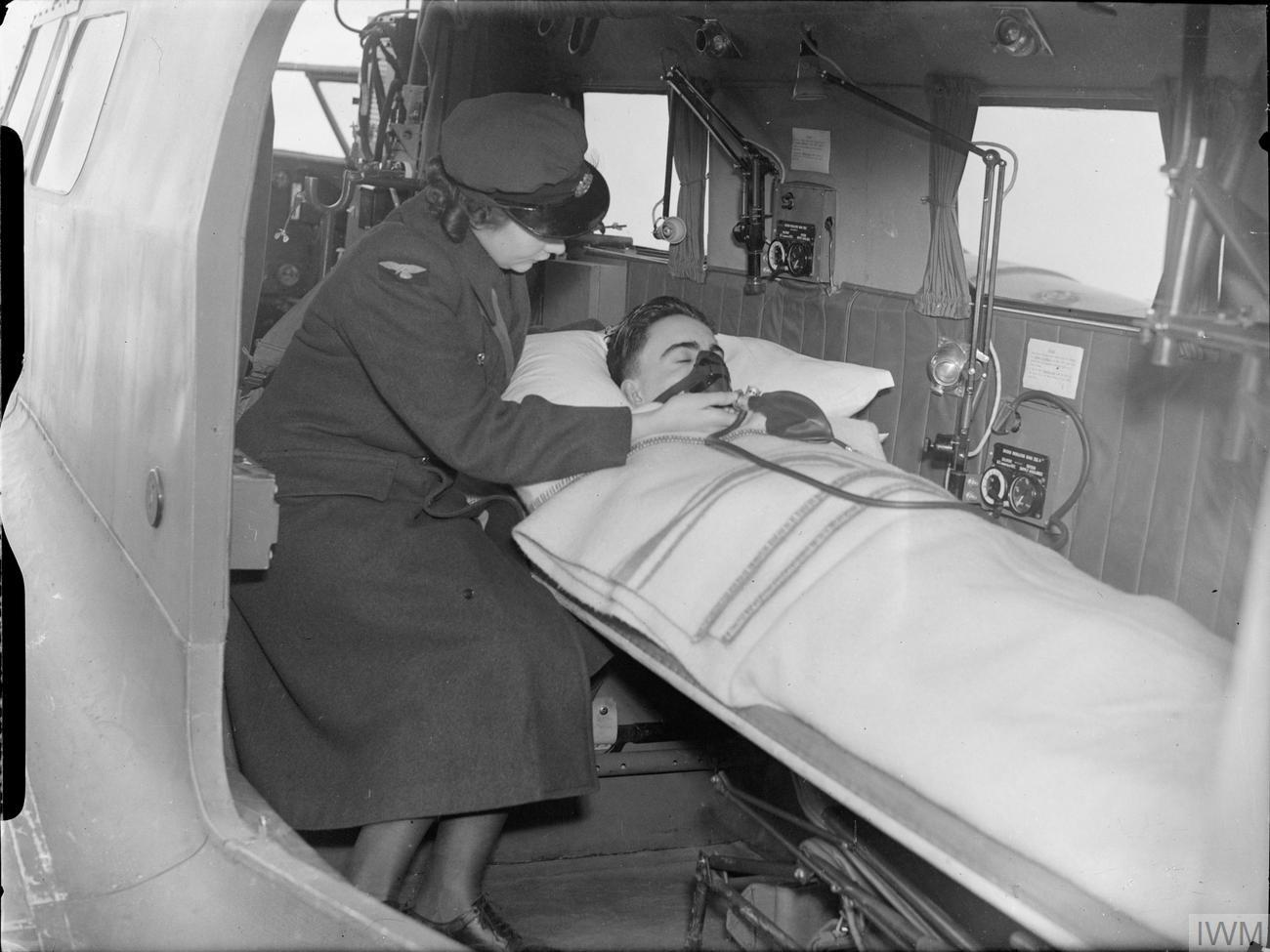
A patient and attendant on board an Oxford of the Air Ambulance Unit

The Oxford was based on the company's existing commercial 8-seater aircraft, the AS.6 Envoy, designed by Hessell Tiltman. Seven Envoys had already been modified for the South African Air Force (SAAF) as the "Convertible Envoy", which could be equipped at short notice with bomb racks and with a machine-gun in a hand-operated Armstrong Whitworth dorsal turret. Airspeed gained substantial benefit from its prior work on the Envoy and the Convertible Envoy in its development of the Oxford. The Air Ministry approved of the project, leading to an initial order for the type being placed during 1937.

It was decided to opt for a large first batch, totalling 136 aircraft, as this allowed for the implementation of more economical flow-line production at Airspeed's Portsmouth factory. On 19 June 1937, the first prototype Oxford, L4534, was first flown by chief test pilot C H A 'Percy' Colman from Portsmouth. Initially, two variants were planned; the Mark I, which was viewed as a general-purpose training aircraft equipped with a dorsal gun turret, and the Mark II, which lacked any turret but was instead fitted with dual controls. As further large contracts for the aircraft were placed with Airspeed, (100 Mk Is and 100 Mk IIs) it was arranged that de Havilland Aircraft would build them at Hatfield later, to meet the demands for Oxfords for training. Other companies also manufactured the aircraft.

By the end of production, a total of 8,751 Oxfords had been completed. Of these, 4,411 had been produced by Airspeed at its Portsmouth factory, another 550 at the Airspeed-run shadow factory at Christchurch, Dorset, 1,515 by de Havilland at Hatfield, 1,360 by Percival Aircraft at Luton and 750 by Standard Motors at Coventry. (Note: The manufacturers' production figures given by Middleton and Taylor add up to 8,586 aircraft, a discrepancy of 165 from the production total of 8,751 given by Fredriksen and Angelucci and Matricardi. Taylor suggests that the discrepancy was due to 165 Oxfords that were ordered from Percival but cancelled before construction.)

== Design ==
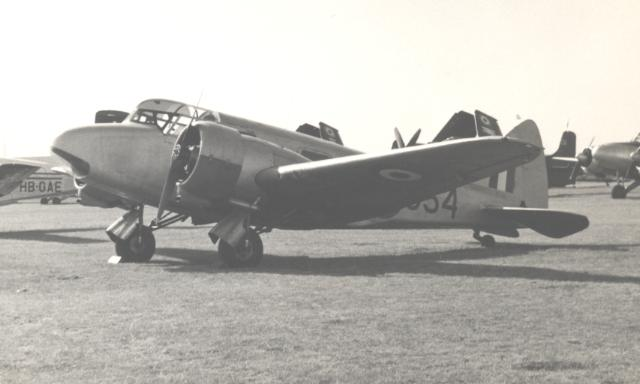
Oxford communications aircraft of RAF Marham Station Flight at Blackbushe Airport in September 1955

The Oxford was a low-wing twin-engine cantilever monoplane, with a semi-monocoque fuselage, a conventional landing gear and a wooden tail unit. It was capable of reproducing the flight characteristics of many contemporary front-line aircraft. It was intended to be suitable for a range of training missions, including navigation, flying instruction, night flying, instrument flying, wireless, direction-finding, gunnery, and vertical photography. The Oxford incorporated various modern innovations and equipment fittings, including a full array of instruments and controls within the cockpit, which assisted in its principal trainer role. The Oxford could also be used in various secondary roles, such as an air ambulance and maritime patrol aircraft.

The Oxford was suitably representative as to enable pilots to progress to larger transport aircraft with ease, while possessing smooth flight characteristics. The controls were relatively straightforward, typically remaining consistent and easily adjustable; the second pilot's position also has a full set of key flight instruments. It was equipped with the standard blind-flying panel, incorporating an airspeed indicator, altimeter, artificial horizon, directional gyroscope, rate of climb indicator and turn indicator. Life support equipment includes three oxygen regulators, a flowmeter, three bayonet unions and three high-pressure oxygen cylinders of 750 litres capacity. The view from the cockpit was considered to be very good, superior to the majority of its contemporaries but unavoidably interrupted by the engine cowlings creating blind spots.

It was normally operated by a three-man crew; the seating arrangement could be altered to suit various purposes, such as to better enable a specific training role. The cockpit had dual flying controls and a pair of seats, intended to accommodate a pilot and either a navigator or second pilot alongside. When used for bomb aimer training, the second set of controls would be removed and the space used to accommodate a prone bomb-aimer. When used as a navigation trainer, the second seat was pushed back so that it would line up with the chart table. Aft of the cockpit was a wireless operator station, facing aft on the starboard side of the fuselage. On the Oxford I, a dorsal turret was located amidships; it could be used for training navigators, bomb-aimers, wireless operators, air gunners and camera operators. The centre section can contain up to 16 11 lb (5.0 kg) practice bombs, which are controlled by bomb-release switches installed at the pilot and bomb-aimers' stations.

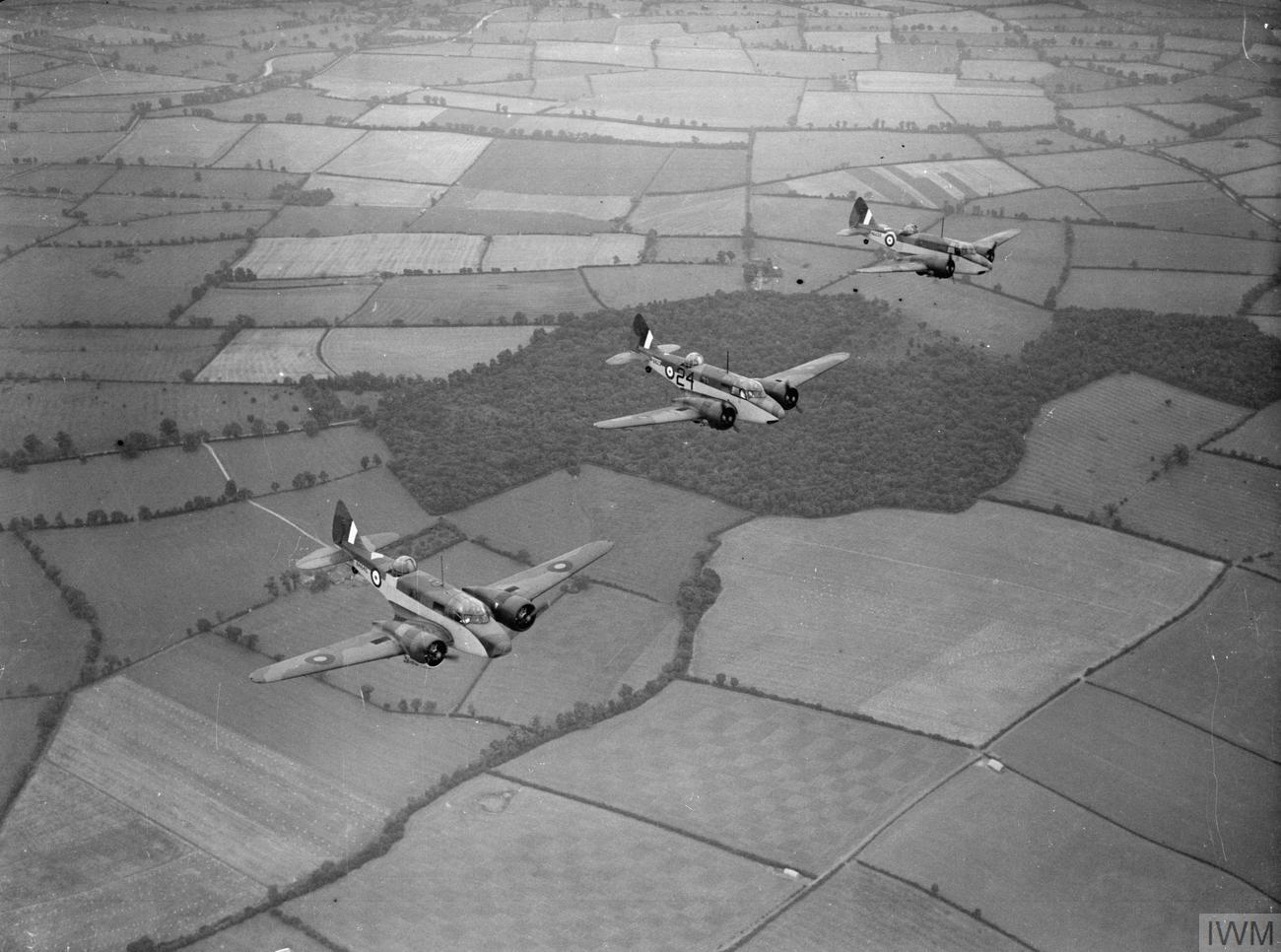
A trio of Oxfords flying in formation

The Oxford was normally powered by a pair of Armstrong Siddeley Cheetah X air-cooled radial engines of 340 hp (250 kW). These were initially fitted with wooden fixed-position de Havilland propellers, but had been designed to accommodate variable-pitch propellers when these became available. Only 199 (Mk.V) were actually equipped with variable-pitch propellers but all Oxford cockpits contained a propeller pitch lever, allowing an instructor to insist it was moved from "Coarse" to "Fine" for landing to reinforce this important step for trainee pilots. The starboard engine drives a hydraulic pump and air compressor, the former actuating the undercarriage and flaps while the latter is used for the braking system; a vacuum pump is also present for the gyroscopic instruments. The port engine drives a 500-watt electrical generator. The engine cowling has an inlet which draws cooling air into a tank; a pair of tinned steel oil tanks are also contained within the cowling. Welded steel construction was used for the nacelles, which attach to the centre section of the wing at four rubber-insulated joints.

The retractable undercarriage of the Oxford had broken-braced twin oleo legs that retract rearward into the engine nacelles. Although actuation of the retraction mechanism is normally achieved by an engine-driven pump, a manual mechanism is provided to force the wheels down in the event of an engine failure in flight. The undercarriage wheels are equipped with pneumatically-operated brakes, controlled by a lever set on each control column. For inspection, there are access panels beneath the pilot's cockpit for internal access to the flight controls, hydraulics and electrical components; inspection panels are also present in the outer wing sections.

The semi-monocoque fuselage of Oxford has spruce longerons and stiffeners underneath a plywood exterior. It was constructed in two sections on separate jigs, divided between the front and rear; these are joined together at the rear bulkhead. The forward bulkhead is reinforced so that the structure can withstand the impact of the aircraft turning over during landing. The elevator and fin of the empennage have a wooden spar and rib structure covered by fabric. The fuselage can be partially dismantled, the wing dividing into three sections, so that it can be transported by road. The wing uses a stressed-skin ply-covered structure using spruce flanges and ply webs. The spars were assembled in a single jig, while others are used for the elements of the leading edge and trailing edge. Similar construction to the centre section is also used in the outer panels. The wings have with hydraulically-operated split flaps, that extend between the ailerons.

== Operational history ==
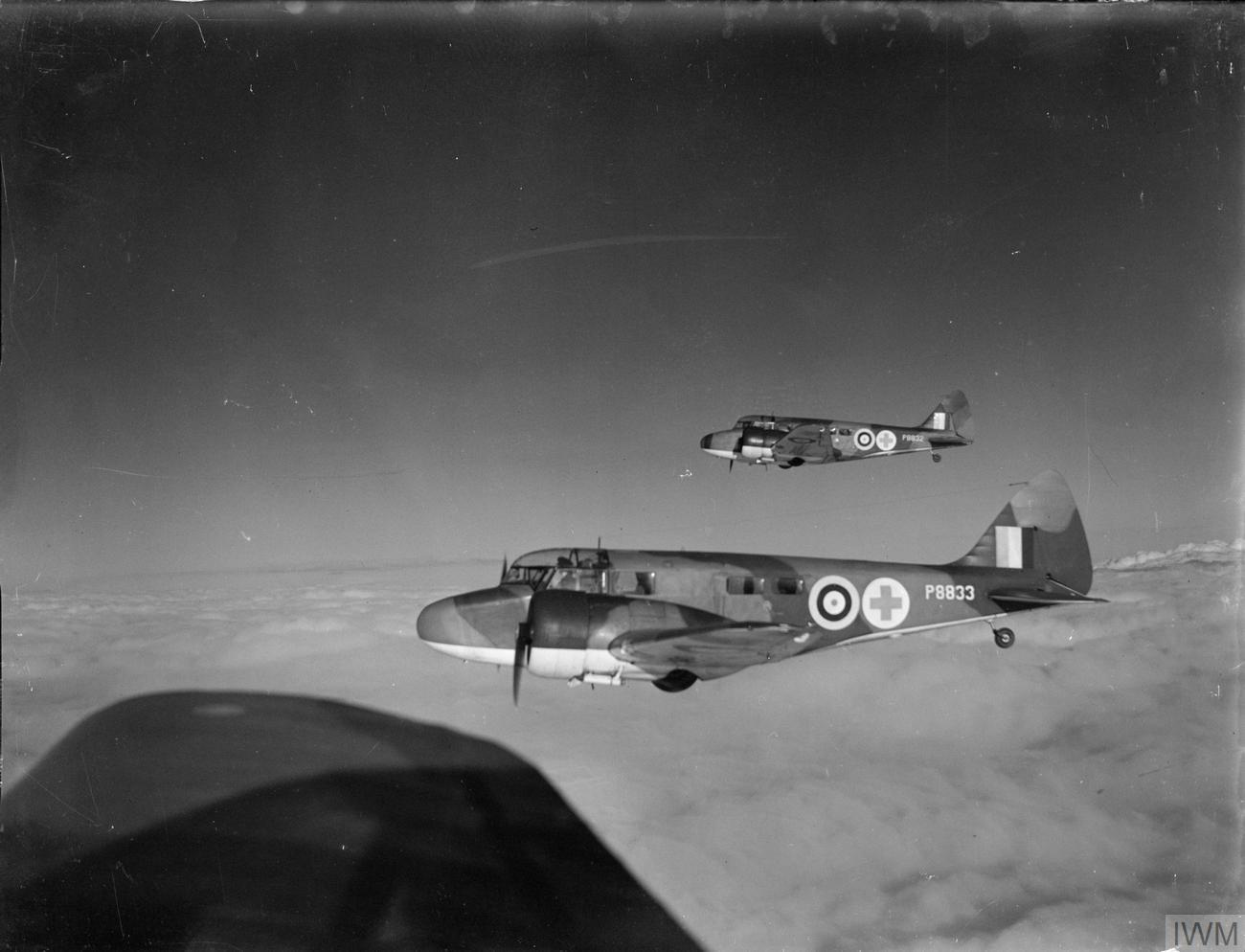
A formation of Oxford air ambulances in flight

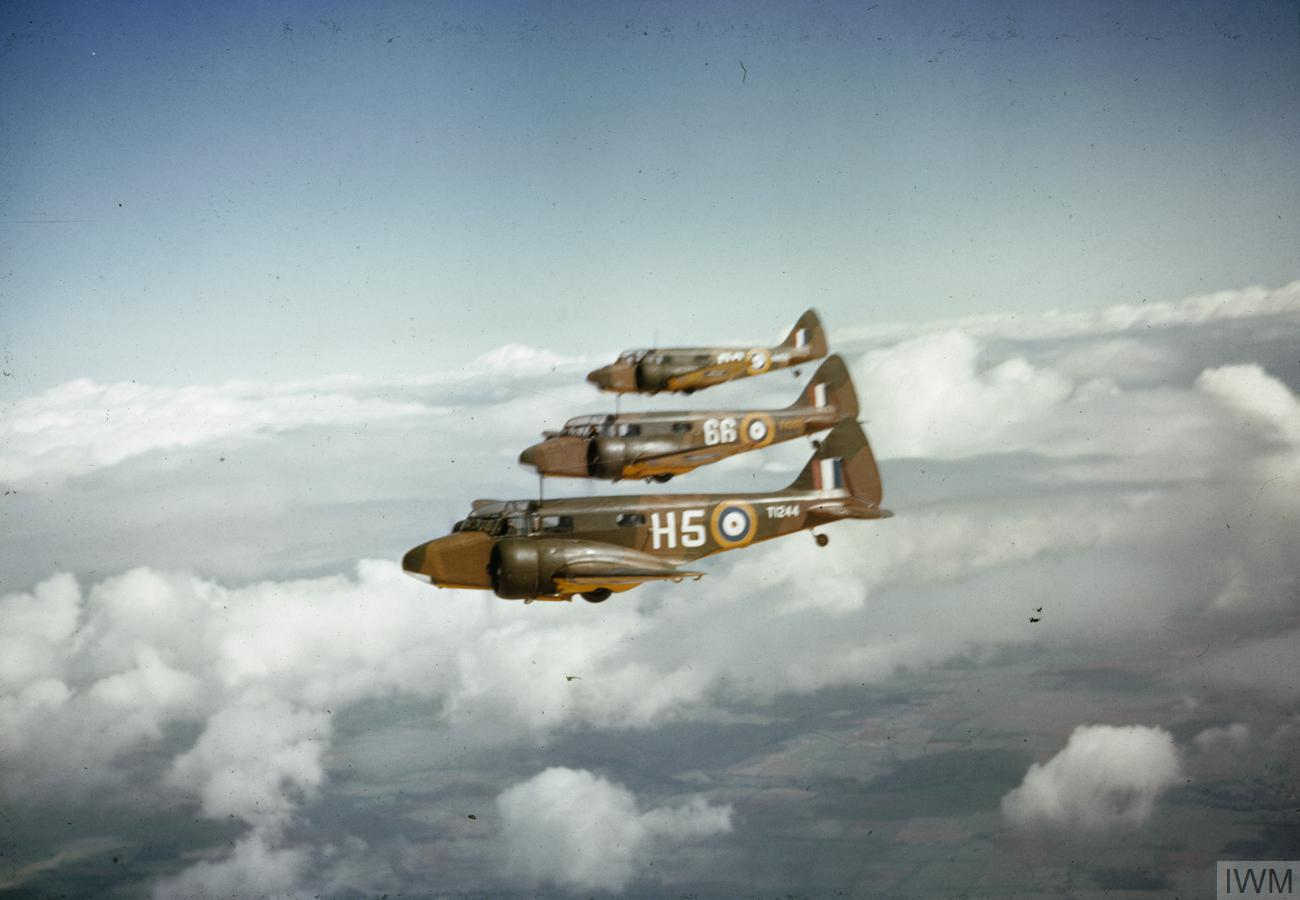
Three Oxford Mk Is of No. 6 Flying Training School at RAF Little Rissington, Gloucestershire, in formation flight

The Oxford (nicknamed the 'Ox-box') was used to prepare complete aircrews for RAF Bomber Command and could simultaneously train pilots, navigators, bomb aimers, gunners and radio operators on the same flight. In addition to training duties, Oxfords were used in communications and anti-submarine roles and as air ambulances in the Middle East.

The Oxford was the preferred trainer for the Empire Air Training Scheme and British Commonwealth Air Training Plan (BCATP), with over 2,900 sent to Commonwealth countries; Australia, Canada (where the majority of training was carried out), New Zealand, South Africa, and Southern Rhodesia. 27 Oxfords were on the strength of No 4 Flying Training School RAF Habbaniya, Iraq in early 1941 and some were converted locally for use as light bombers to help in the defence of the School against Iraqi forces.

Oxfords continued to serve the Royal Air Force as trainers and light transports until the last was withdrawn from service in 1956. A small number of ex RAF Oxfords were converted to civilian use post-war, along with 152 more that were converted into 6-seat commercial airliners called the AS.65 Consul. Meanwhile a fair number of surplus RAF aircraft were sold for use by overseas air arms, some as early as 1943, but mostly post-war. (see below)

Most Oxfords in the UK were equipped with a knotted rope from the pilot's seat to the rear door to assist evacuation should the plane inadvertently be put into a spin, which it was almost impossible to recover from. When the pilot(s) released their seat belts centripetal force would hurl them to the rear of the plane, beyond the exit door, from which it was impossible to crawl forward to the door. The rope was installed as a response to a test by four airmen who tried to recover from a spin from 18,000 ft. When no recovery happened no matter what was tried the four released their harness and were hurled to the rear of their plane and there remained helpless as the spiral descent continued. However all was not lost. The plane was in such a flat spin when it reached the ground that it skidded sideways over the surface of a field until the tail section hit a haystack and broke off. The four airmen walked away relatively unharmed, the knotted rope being their only positive remedy for an Oxford in a spin.

=== Australia ===
From November 1940, the Royal Australian Air Force received 391 Oxford I and IIs from RAF contracts for use in Australia. Most of the survivors were sold in the early 1950s.

=== Canada ===
The Royal Canadian Air Force ordered 25 Oxford Is in 1938. They were taken from RAF stocks and shipped to Canada in 1939 and assembled by Canadian Vickers at Montreal. Issued to the Central Flying School, they were later joined by large numbers of RAF aircraft to equip the Service Flying Training Schools. 819 Oxfords of all Marks were operated by the RCAF in Canada for the BCATP during the war.

=== New Zealand ===
New Zealand was one of the first nations to order the Oxford in 1937 with a contract for five Oxford Is; the fifth aircraft was modified as a survey aircraft. They were delivered to New Zealand by sea and assembled at RNZAF Hobsonville at the end of 1938. The RNZAF placed further orders for six and then 30 Oxfords. With the start of the Commonwealth Air Training Plan a further 140 aircraft were allocated, which included the last batch of 30 ordered. In total, the RNZAF operated 299 Oxfords between 1938 and 1952.

=== South Africa ===
As part of the Commonwealth Air Training Plan, the South African Air Force was allocated nearly 700 Oxfords which started to arrive in South Africa from November 1940. Due to the intense training, 256 aircraft were lost to accidents. Most survivors were withdrawn in 1945 and had been sold by 1947.

=== United Kingdom ===
==== Amy Johnson's Final Flight ====
In January 1941, whilst flying an Oxford for the Air Transport Auxiliary (ATA), Amy Johnson flew off-course in adverse weather conditions, until her aircraft crashed into the Thames Estuary. Accounts vary, but it is generally accepted that she bailed out, then succumbed to the intense cold whilst in the water, and may then have been dragged underneath a rescue vessel. In difficult sea conditions, the Captain of the rescue vessel, Lt Cmdr Walter Fletcher, entered the water in an attempt to retrieve what was thought to be a body, but he lost consciousness in the extreme cold, and died in hospital several days later.

=== United States ===
The United States Army Air Forces (USAAF) used 137 Oxfords on loan from the Royal Air Force. Most were used as general-purpose communications aircraft in the United Kingdom; from June 1942 they were also used for Beam Approach training. By the end of 1944, American types were available, and all USAAF Oxfords had been returned to the RAF. A small number had also been loaned to the USAAF in Australia by the Royal Australian Air Force. Two Oxfords were used by the United States Navy in the United Kingdom as communications aircraft.

=== Other users ===
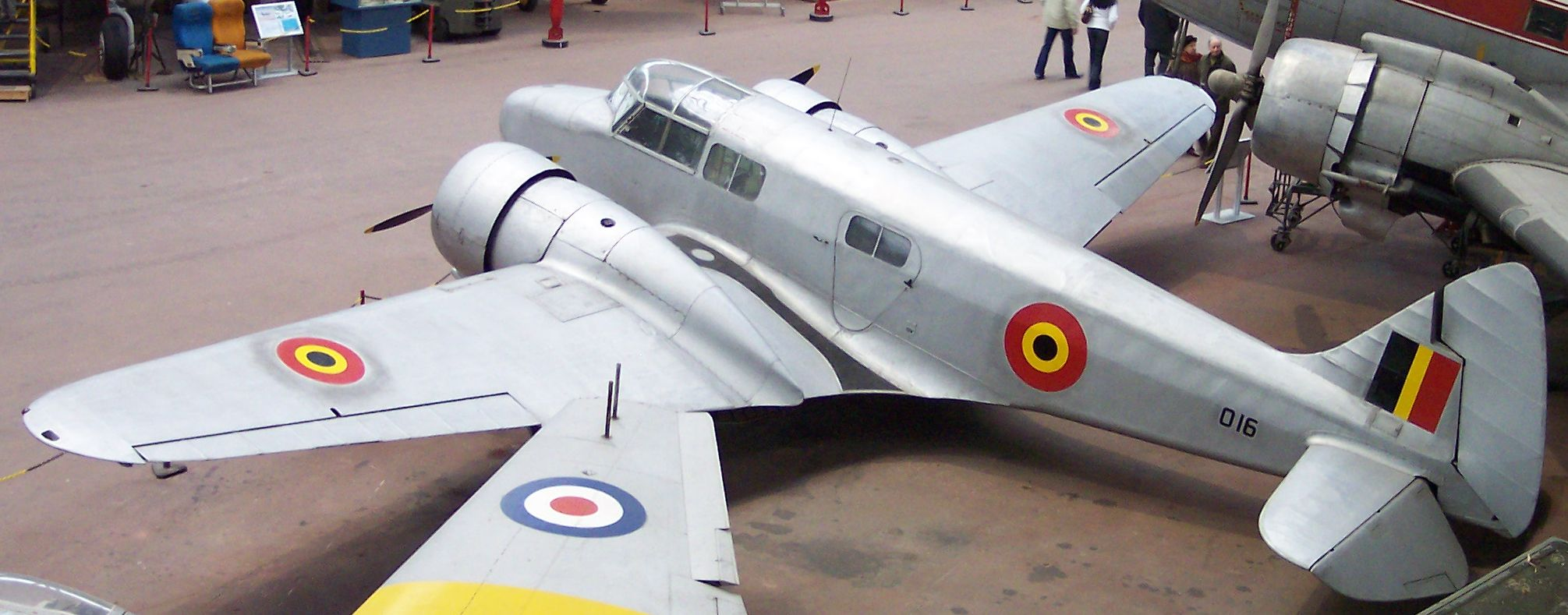
Preserved Belgian Air Force Oxford in the Brussels War Museum

Belgium

- When the Belgian section of the Royal Air Force returned to Belgian control as the Militaire Vliegwezen/Aviation Militaire (became the Belgian Air Force in 1949), the RAF donated thirty Oxfords to form a flying training school. They were used until the late 1950s with the last aircraft being donated to the Brussels War Museum in 1960.

Belgian Congo
In April 1944 six Oxfords were transferred to the Force Publique in the Belgian Congo, they were withdrawn from use in 1955.
Burma

- At least 15 Oxfords along with some Consuls were supplied to the Union of Burma Air Force in the late 1940s with some being modified to carry pod-mounted forward facing machine guns and rocket projectiles.

Ceylon

- Three former RAF Oxfords were delivered to the Royal Ceylon Air Force in 1953.

Czechoslovakia

- It is reported that some Oxfords were given the type code D42 and were used for bombing training.

Denmark

- From the end of 1946 the Danish Air Force received 44 former RAF Oxfords for advanced flying training at Karup, they were also used for communications and aerial photography, all were withdrawn by 1956.

Egypt

- RAF Oxfords where loaned to the Royal Egyptian Air Force but at least one was transferred in 1948.

France

- The Free French Air Force in Equatorial Africa (Groupe 'Artois') received five new Oxfords in 1943 and these served until 1946.

Greece

- The Royal Hellenic Air Force received at least 33 Oxfords in 1947 for transport and aerial photography.

India

- When India became independent in December 1947 nine Oxfords were transferred to the Royal Indian Air Force, later Indian Air Force from December 1949.

Iran

- Three Oxfords were delivered to the Imperial Iranian Air Force.

Israel

- Three Oxfords and eleven Consuls were used by the Central Flying School of the Israeli Defence Force Air Force for twin-engined training in the early 1950s.

Netherlands

- From May 1946 the Royal Netherlands Air Force received 28 Oxfords for aircrew training, they had been withdrawn from use by 1952.
- In October 1947 the Royal Netherlands Navy received three Oxfords for multi-engined and navigation training from Valkenburg, two former Royal Netherlands Air Force aircraft were added in 1951, all were withdrawn by 1952.

Norway

- The Royal Norwegian Air Force bought twenty surplus Oxfords from the RAF in 1947.

Portugal

- The Portuguese Army and Navy each received six Oxfords in 1943 under Operation Oatmeal, by the time the Portuguese Air Force was formed in 1952 four aircraft were still in service.

Turkey

- The Turkish Air Force were supplied with 50 Oxford I's in 1943 and these were joined by twenty more between 1946 and 1947. They were replaced by the AT-11 in the early 1950s and the survivors were scrapped.

Yugoslavia

- Five Oxfords were supplied to the Yugoslav Air Force between 1951 and 1958 by Norway under the Mutual Defence Aid Program and used for twin-engined training of Mosquito crews.

== Variants ==
AS.10 Oxford I
The first Mark I flew on 19 June 1937 and entered service with the Central Flying School in November of that year. By the start of the war, about 300 Mk I Oxfords were in service with the RAF, while a number were also being used by the Royal New Zealand Air Force to train pilots for the RAF.
AS.10 Oxford II
The second planned version was the Oxford II, it didn't have a turret but had dual controls so it could be used as an advanced pilot trainer as well as training for navigators and radio operators. At the start of the second world war 70 were in service.
AS.10 Oxford III
Single example (P1864), no turret, powered by two 420 hp (313 kW) Cheetah XV engines fitted with Rotol constant-speed propellers.
AS.10 Oxford IV
Flying test-bed for de Havilland Gipsy Queen IV engines.
Oxford T.II
Only 9 of these were built, eight of them being conversions of Mk Is.
AS.40 Oxford
Civil conversion for radio research, two built.
AS.41 Oxford
Used by Miles Aircraft as a flying test-bed for Alvis Leonides engine, one conversion.
AS.42 Oxford
Oxford I to meet Specification T.39/37 for New Zealand.
AS.43 Oxford
Survey variant of the AS.42
AS.46 Oxford V
The final variant, upgraded to Pratt & Whitney R-985 radial engines with 450 hp (335 kW) and Hamilton-Standard variable-pitch propellers. Many Mark I and II Oxfords were upgraded to the Mark V standard.
AS.65 Consul
After the end of WWII, over 150 aircraft surplus ex-RAF Oxfords were converted for civilian transport operation; this type was known as the Airspeed Consul.

== Operators ==
Australia

- Royal Australian Air Force

Belgium

- Belgian Air Force

Belgian Congo

- Force Publique

Burma

- Union of Burma Air Force

Ceylon

- Royal Ceylon Air Force

Canada

- Royal Canadian Air Force

Czechoslovakia

- Czechoslovak Air Force – One aircraft, in service from 1945 to 1948

Denmark

- Royal Danish Air Force

Egypt

- Royal Egyptian Air Force

Free France

- Free French Air Force

Greece

- Royal Hellenic Air Force

India

- Indian Air Force

Iran

- Imperial Iranian Air Force

Israel

- Israeli Air Force

Netherlands

- Royal Netherlands Air Force
- Dutch Naval Aviation Service

New Zealand

- Royal New Zealand Air Force
  - No. 1 Squadron RNZAF
  - No. 2 Squadron RNZAF
  - No. 3 Squadron RNZAF
  - No. 7 Squadron RNZAF
  - No. 8 Squadron RNZAF
  - No. 14 Squadron RNZAF
  - No. 42 Squadron RNZAF

Norway

- Royal Norwegian Air Force

Poland

- Polish Air Force in Great Britain

Portugal

- Portuguese Air Force
- Portuguese Army
- Portuguese Navy

South Africa

- South African Air Force

Turkey

- Turkish Air Force

United Kingdom

- Royal Air Force
  - No. 1 Squadron RAF
  - No. 5 Squadron RAF
  - No. 17 Squadron RAF
  - No. 20 Squadron RAF
  - No. 24 Squadron RAF
  - No. 34 Squadron RAF
  - No. 41 Squadron RAF
  - No. 116 Squadron RAF
  - No. 173 Squadron RAF
  - No. 192 Squadron RAF
  - No. 285 Squadron RAF
  - No. 286 Squadron RAF
  - No. 287 Squadron RAF
  - No. 288 Squadron RAF
  - No. 289 Squadron RAF
  - No. 290 Squadron RAF
  - No. 510 Squadron RAF
  - No. 526 Squadron RAF
  - No. 527 Squadron RAF
  - No. 529 Squadron RAF
  - No. 567 Squadron RAF
  - No. 577 Squadron RAF
  - No. 587 Squadron RAF
  - No. 595 Squadron RAF
  - No. 598 Squadron RAF
  - No. 631 Squadron RAF
  - No. 667 Squadron RAF
  - No. 691 Squadron RAF
  - No. 695 Squadron RAF
- Fleet Air Arm
  - 700 Naval Air Squadron
  - 701 Naval Air Squadron
  - 702 Naval Air Squadron
  - 703 Naval Air Squadron
  - 720 Naval Air Squadron
  - 727 Naval Air Squadron
  - 728 Naval Air Squadron
  - 729 Naval Air Squadron
  - 730 Naval Air Squadron
  - 739 Naval Air Squadron
  - 740 Naval Air Squadron
  - 744 Naval Air Squadron
  - 750 Naval Air Squadron
  - 751 Naval Air Squadron
  - 758 Naval Air Squadron
  - 759 Naval Air Squadron
  - 760 Naval Air Squadron
  - 761 Naval Air Squadron
  - 762 Naval Air Squadron
  - 765 Naval Air Squadron
  - 766 Naval Air Squadron
  - 771 Naval Air Squadron
  - 775 Naval Air Squadron
  - 776 Naval Air Squadron
  - 780 Naval Air Squadron
  - 781 Naval Air Squadron
  - 782 Naval Air Squadron
  - 787 Naval Air Squadron
  - 789 Naval Air Squadron
  - 790 Naval Air Squadron
  - 792 Naval Air Squadron
  - 798 Naval Air Squadron
  - 799 Naval Air Squadron
  - 1701 Naval Air Squadron

United States

- United States Army Air Forces
- United States Navy

Yugoslavia

- SFR Yugoslav Air Force

== Surviving aircraft ==
Australia

- Oxford I composite reproduction at the B-24 Liberator Memorial Australia, Werribee Victoria.
- Oxford I HN631 composite restoration at the Gippsland Armed Forces Museu, Westsale Victoria.
- Oxford I cockpit section displayed at Lincoln Nitschke Military & Historical Aircraft Collection, Greenock, South Australia.
- Oxford I cockpit replica section displayed at the Alan Penhall Friends of the Avro Anson Museum, Ballarat Victoria.

Belgium

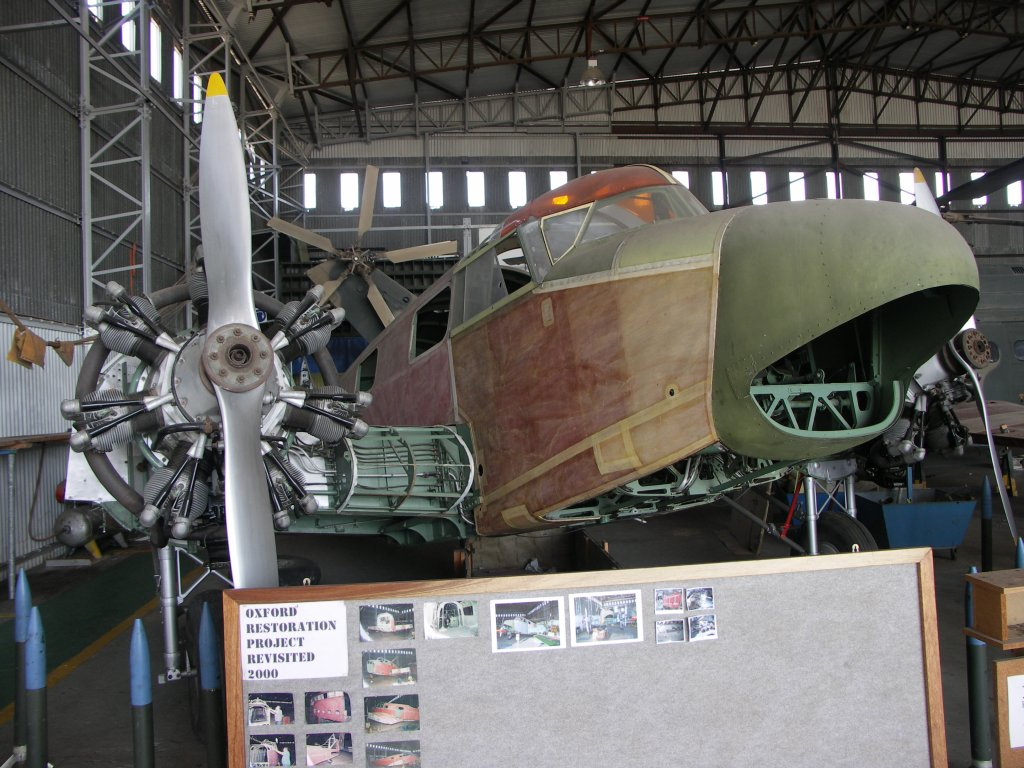
An Airspeed Oxford restoration on display at the South African Air Force Museum, Port Elizabeth

- O-16 – Oxford I on static display at the Royal Museum of the Armed Forces and Military History in Brussels. Original served with the Royal Air Force as MP455 before going to the Belgian Air Force in 1947.

Canada

- Replica – Unknown variant with Frank Thompson of Reidland, Saskatchewan, built to static display condition by volunteers from the Saskatchewan Western Development Museum in Moose Jaw, Saskatchewan.

New Zealand

- NZ277 – Oxford I wreckage on display at the Taranaki Aviation Transport and Technology Museum near New Plymouth, Taranaki. The aircraft crashed in October 1942. The wreckage was discovered 32 years later by NZ Forester Service hunter Errol Clince in 1974.
- NZ1332 – Oxford II under restoration by Don Subritzky in Dairy Flat, Auckland.
- PK286 – Oxford I on static display at the Air Force Museum of New Zealand in Wigram, Canterbury. It had been converted to Airspeed Consul configuration in 1947. It is on long-term loan from the Canada Aviation and Space Museum. The aircraft went on display in February 2016.
- R6029 – Oxford II on display at the Croydon Aircraft Company in Mandeville, Southland. It is configured as Consul VR-SCD.

South Africa

- ED290 – Oxford I under restoration to static display at the South African Air Force Museum in Port Elizabeth, Eastern Cape.

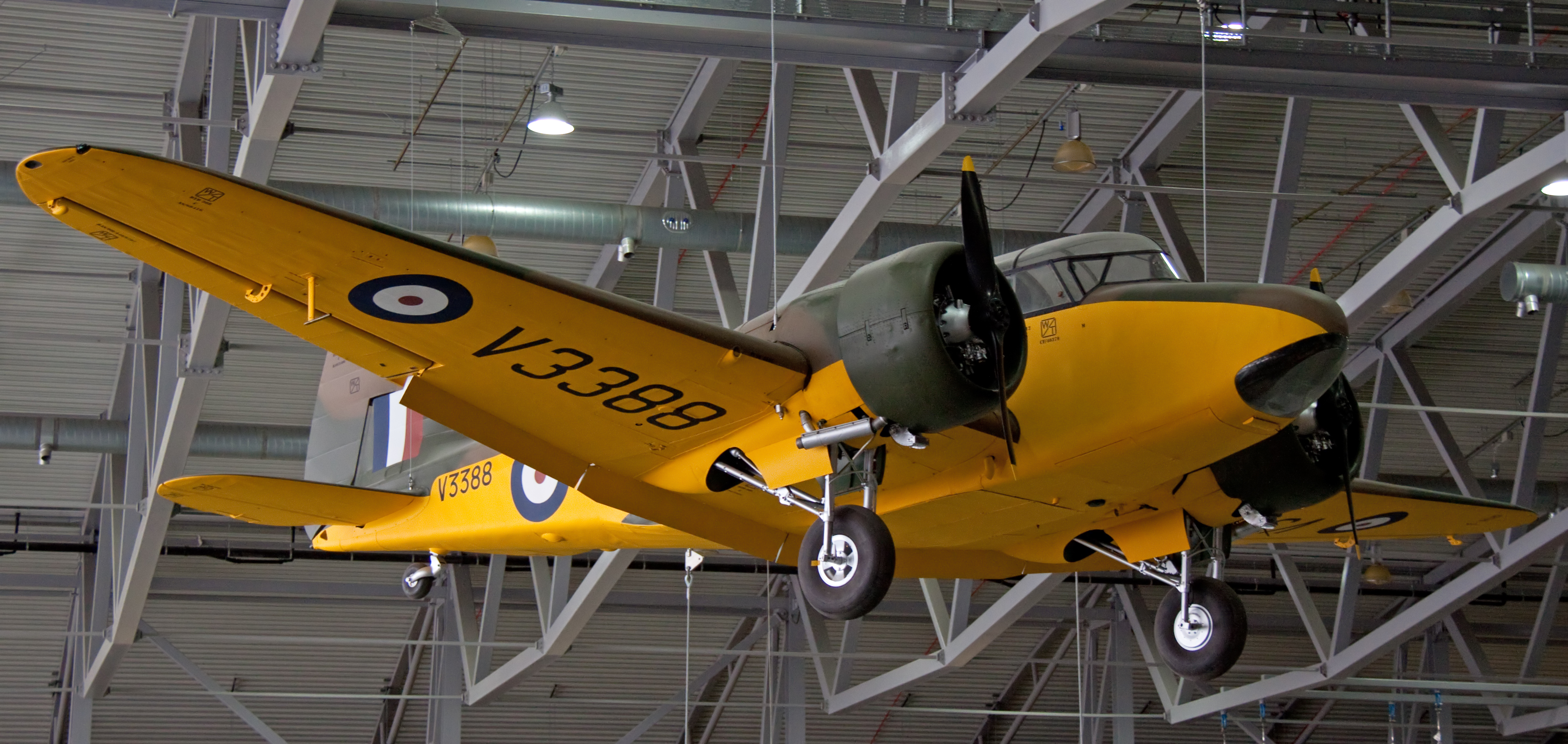
Oxford I V3388 displayed at the Imperial War Museum Duxford, 2011

United Kingdom

- V3388 – Oxford I on static display at the Imperial War Museum in Duxford, Cambridgeshire.
- AT605 – Oxford I wreck under rebuild with the Midland Aircraft Recovery Group.
- EB518/V3540 – Oxford V under restoration at the Spitfire Visitor Centre in Blackpool, Lancashire The Saving Amy Project. It is being assembled from the remains of Mk.V EB518, together with parts from other sources, and with substantial new wooden structure.
- MP425 – Oxford I on static display at the Royal Air Force Museum London in London.

== Specifications (Mk I) ==
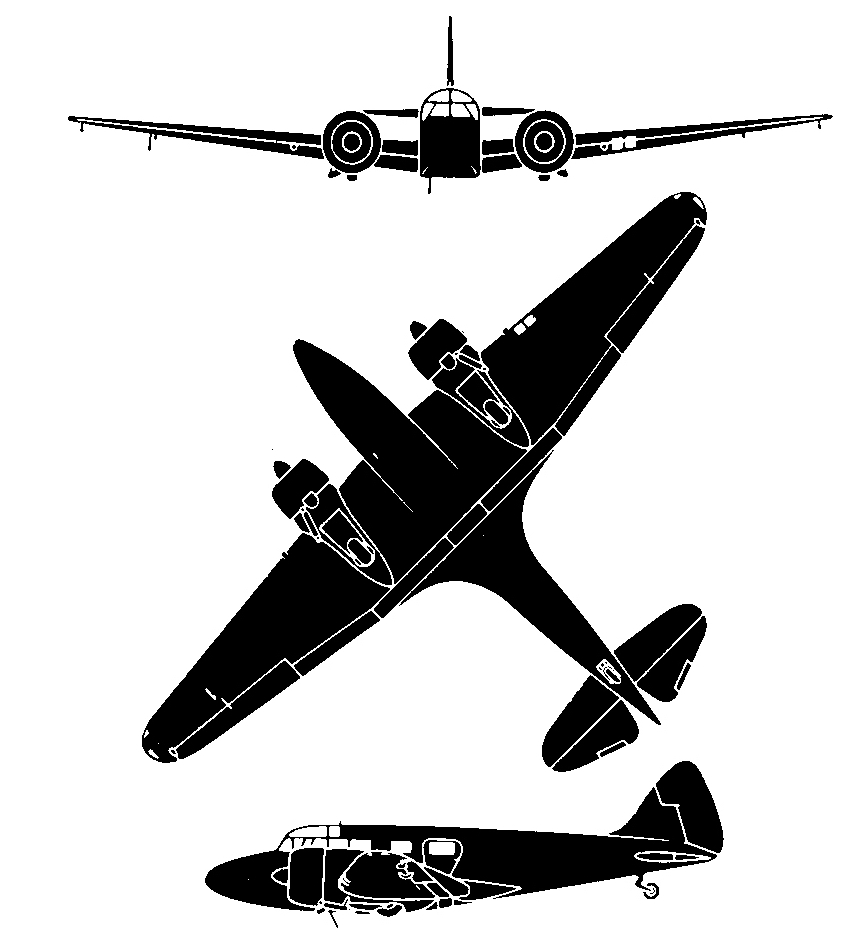
Oxford AS 10 3-view drawings

Data from Modern Trainer

General characteristics

- Crew: 3
- Length: 34 ft 6 in (10.52 m)
- Wingspan: 53 ft 4 in (16.26 m)
- Height: 11 ft 1 in (3.38 m)
- Wing area: 348 sq ft (32.3 m^{2})
- Empty weight: 5,322 lb (2,414 kg)
- Gross weight: 7,500 lb (3,402 kg)
- Fuel capacity: 156 imp gal (187 US gal; 710 L)
- Powerplant: 2 × Armstrong Siddeley Cheetah X radial engines, 350 hp (260 kW) each

Performance

- Maximum speed: 192 mph (309 km/h, 167 kn)
- Endurance: 5.5 hr
- Service ceiling: 23,550 ft (7,180 m)
- Rate of climb: 1,340 ft/min (6.8 m/s)

Armament

- Guns: 1 × 0.303 in (7.7 mm) Vickers K machine gun in dorsal turret
- Bombs: 16 × 11.5 lb (5.2 kg) practice bombs carried externally

== See also ==
External videos
- Reveal of a freshly-restored Oxford
- Images of a preserved Oxford on static display

- Nevil Shute, aeronautical engineer, popular novelist, and co-founder of Airspeed.

Related development

- Airspeed Consul
- Airspeed Envoy

Aircraft of comparable role, configuration, and era

- Avro Anson
- Cessna AT-17 Bobcat

Related lists

- List of aircraft of World War II
