= 782 Naval Air Squadron =

Inactive flying squadron of the Royal Navy's Fleet Air Arm

- Squadron badge
- Active: 1939; 1940–1953
- Disbanded: 9 October 1953
- Country: United Kingdom
- Branch: Royal Navy
- Type: Fleet Air Arm Second Line Squadron
- Role: Armament Training Squadron; Northern Communications Squadron
- Size: Squadron
- Part of: Fleet Air Arm
- Home station: See Naval air stations section for full list.
- Aircraft: See Aircraft flown section for full list.

Insignia
- Squadron Badge Description: Green, a horse's head erased and with wings elevated white gorged with a chaplet of roses thistles and shamrocks proper (1949)
- Identification Markings: MERLIN plus individual numbers (1941 to 1946); B8A+ (from ~1945 to 1946); 201-205 & 801-815 (from 1946 to 1953)
- Fin Shore Codes: DO (1946 to 1953)

782 Naval Air Squadron (782 NAS), also referred to as 782 Squadron, is an inactive Fleet Air Arm (FAA) naval air squadron of the United Kingdom's Royal Navy (RN). It was last operational from December 1940 to October 1953 at RNAS Donibristle, as the Northern Communications Squadron, providing links between the Naval Air Stations in Scotland, Northern Ireland, and the Shetland and Orkney islands.

It had initially formed in October 1939 as an Armament Training Squadron but disbanded in November to provide personnel for 774 Naval Air Squadron.

== History ==
=== Armament Training Squadron (1939) ===
782 Naval Air Squadron formed at RNAS Ford (HMS Peregrine) on 23 October 1939 as an Armament Training Squadron, but before its intended aircraft could be delivered the squadron disbanded on 10 November, its personnel being amalgamated with those of 815 Naval Air Squadron to form 774 Naval Air Squadron.

=== Northern Communications Squadron (1940–1953) ===
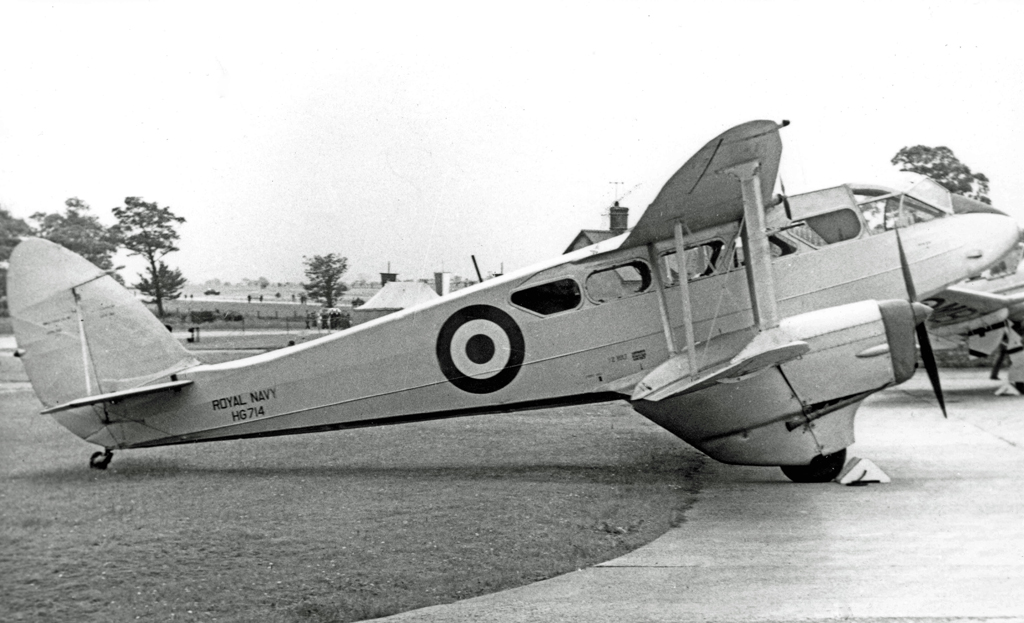
de Havilland Dominie; an example of the type 782 NAS used

782 Naval Air Squadron reformed on 1 December 1940, out of an unnumbered communications flight, at RNAS Donibristle (HMS Merlin), in Fife, Scotland, as the Northern Communications Squadron. It operated connecting the Royal Navy's naval air stations in Scotland, Northern Ireland and the Northern Isles and to and from RNAS Lee-on-Solent (HMS Daedalus), in Hampshire, England. Squadron personnel were former Jersey Airways ground and aircrews. Aircraft were also ex-airline and the squadron was equipped with de Havilland Flamingo, a twin-engined airliner and communications aircraft and de Havilland Express, a four-engined passenger aircraft, as well as Percival Proctor, a radio trainer and communications aircraft. The squadron provided a Flight at Inverness Airport to enable a connection with trains from London.

Additional aircraft were soon acquired and included Beech Expeditor, a 6- to 11-seat trainer, transport and utility aircraft, Airspeed Oxford, a twin-engine trainer aircraft and Beech Traveller, a utility aircraft. Handley Page Harrow were also acquired, designed as a bomber-transport hybrid, some of these aircraft were modified to carry aero engines and other larger freight items. Identification markings comprised the air station name Merlin and an individual number on most of the aircraft.

When 781 Naval Air Squadron disbanded on 31 July 1945, 782 NAS took over part of its role and had detached Flights of de Havilland Dominie, a short-haul biplane airliner, being by then stationed at RNAS Lee-on-Solent (HMS Daedalus), in Hampshire, England, RNAS Eglinton (HMS Gannet), in County Down, Northern Ireland and Inverness In the Scottish Highlands. Around this time the squadron mainly supported the Flag Officer, Flying Training (FOFT) headquarters and it was equipped with Fairey Firefly, a carrier-borne fighter and anti-submarine aircraft, Supermarine Seafire, a navalised version of the Supermarine Spitfire fighter aircraft and Hawker Sea Fury, a fighter aircraft. In July 1953 the FOFT moved to RNAS Yeovilton (HMS Heron), in Somerset, England, which meant the squadron's tasks were reduced and it eventually disbanded on 9 October 1953.

== Aircraft flown ==
The squadron operated a variety of different aircraft, including:

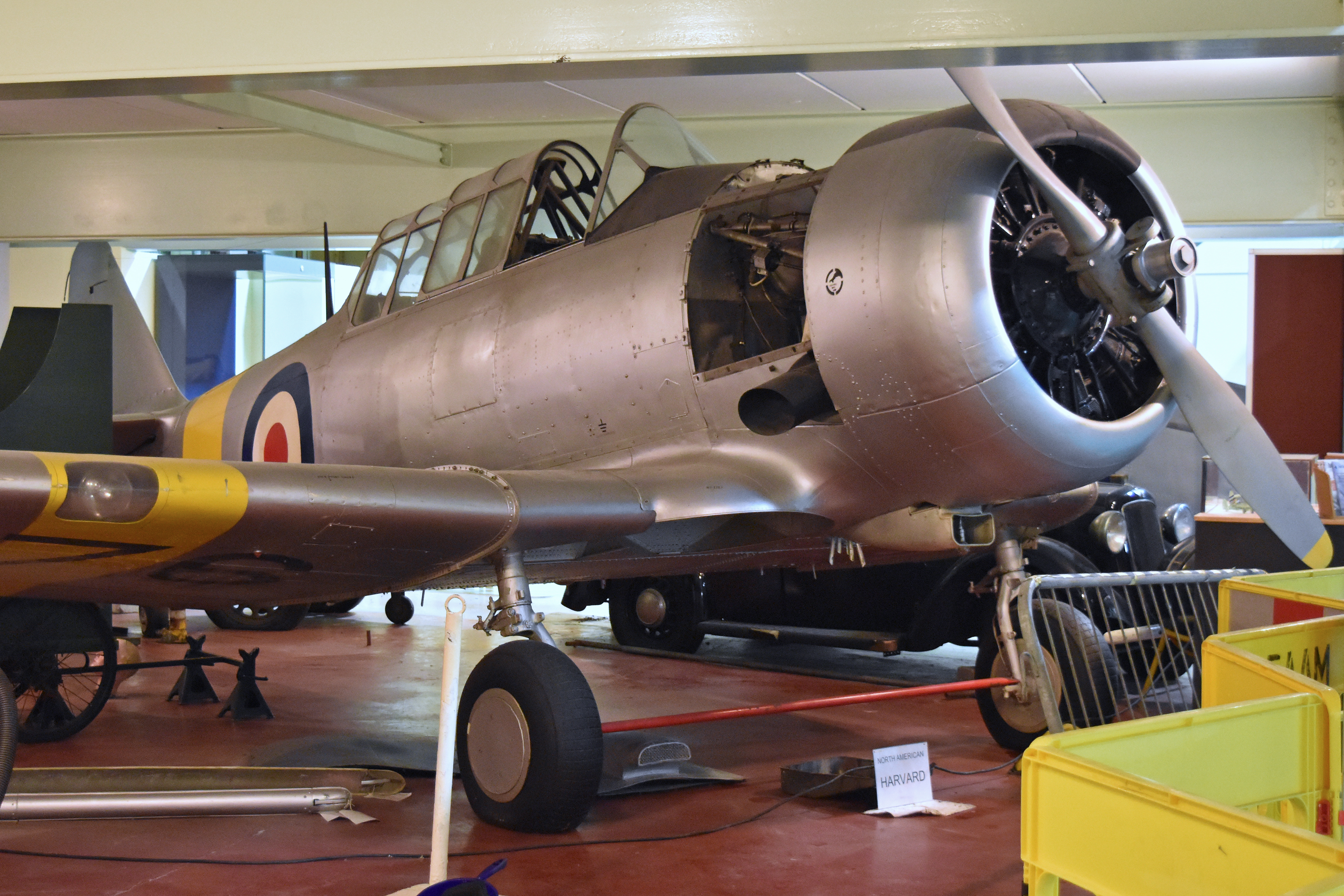
North American Harvard III

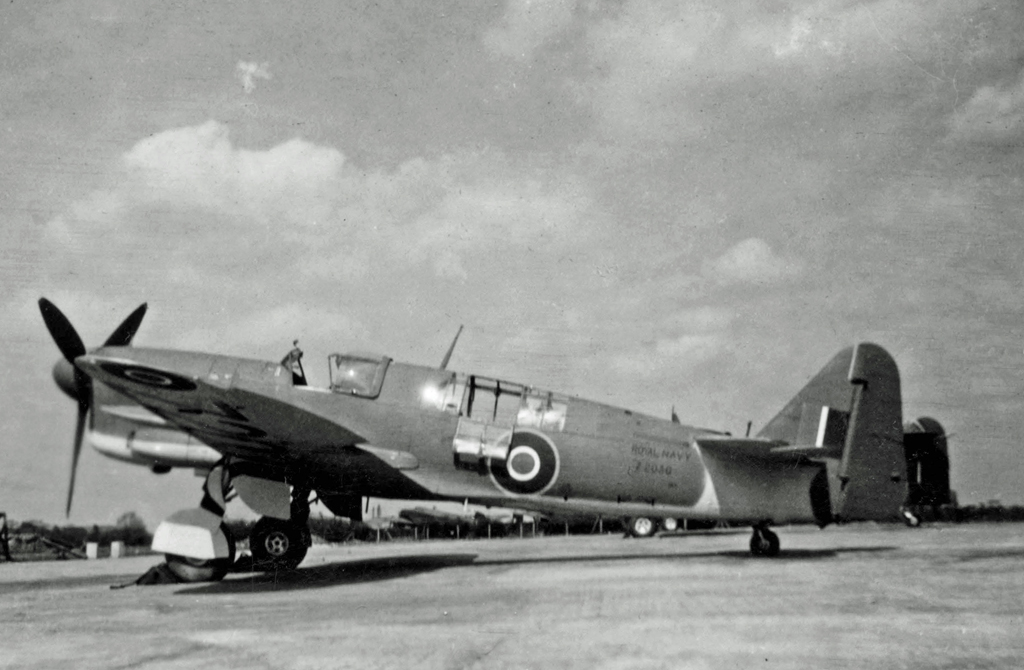
Fairey Firefly FR.1

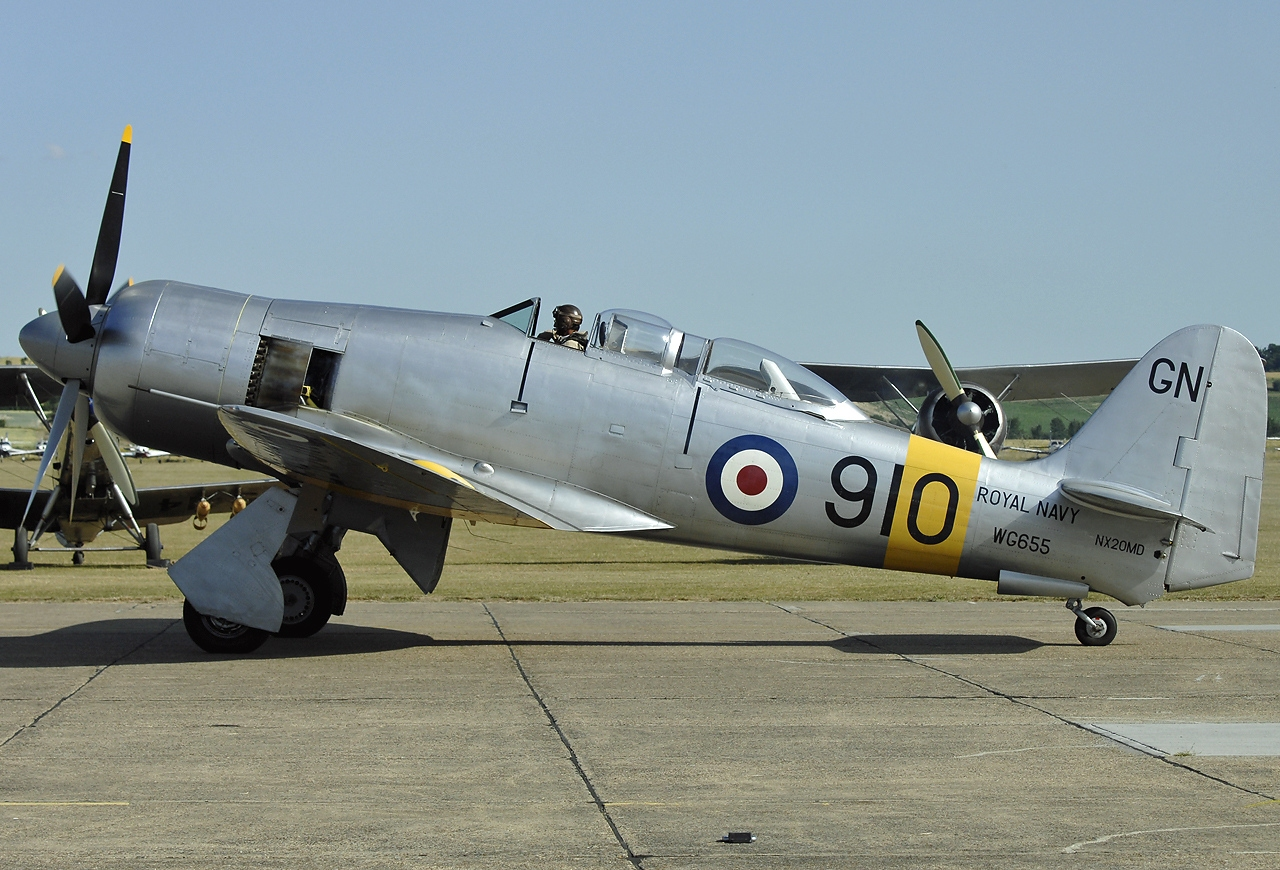
Hawker Sea Fury T.20

- de Havilland Express passenger transport aircraft (December 1940 - August 1945)
- de Havilland Flamingo transport and communications aircraft (December 1940 - August 1945)
- Percival Proctor lA radio trainer/communications aircraft (December 1940 - April 1942)
- de Havilland Moth trainer aircraft (December 1940 - October 1941)
- Handley Page Harrow heavy bomber (May 1941 - July 1943)
- de Havilland Dominie short-haul airliner (July 1941 - October 1953)
- de Havilland Tiger Moth trainer aircraft (December 1941 - June 1946)
- Percival Vega Gull trainer and communications aircraft (January 1942 - August 1943)
- Airspeed Oxford trainer aircraft (May 1942 - April 1953)
- Vickers Wellington Mark I medium bomber (December 1942 - January 1943)
- Stinson Reliant liaison and training aircraft (November 1943 - April 1944)
- Douglas Dakota military transport aircraft (1944)
- Beech Traveller utility aircraft (May 1944 - September 1945)
- Beech Expeditor II trainer, transport and utility aircraft (May 1944 - July 1953)
- Beech Expeditor I trainer, transport and utility aircraft (October 1944 - October 1945)
- Lockheed Hudson IV bomber, reconnaissance, transport and maritime patrol aircraft (July - September 1945)
- Fairey Firefly FR.I fighter and anti-submarine aircraft (August 1945 - May 1953)
- Avro Anson I multi-role trainer aircraft (April 1946 - September 1949)
- North American Harvard IIA advanced trainer (May 1946 - September 1949)
- North American Harvard IIB advanced trainer (May 1946 - September 1949)
- North American Harvard III advanced trainer (August - November 1946)
- Avro Anson C.XII multi-role trainer aircraft (February - May 1947)
- Supermarine Seafire Mk III fighter aircraft (May 1947 - January 1948)
- Supermarine Seafire F Mk XVII fighter aircraft (December 1947 - October 1948)
- Fairey Firefly FR.Mk 5 fighter and reconnaissance aircraft (May 1948 - January 1949)
- Hawker Sea Fury FB.11 fighter aircraft (May 1948 - June 1950)
- Fairey Firefly FR.Mk 4 fighter and reconnaissance aircraft (December 1948 - April 1953)
- Fairey Firefly T.Mk 1 trainer aircraft (May - September 1950)
- Fairey Firefly T.Mk 2 trainer aircraft (September 1950 - May 1953)
- Hawker Sea Fury T.20 trainer aircraft (May - October 1951)
- Fairey Firefly AS.Mk 6 anti-submarine aircraft (July 1952 - January 1953)

== Naval air stations ==
782 Naval Air Squadron operated from a number of naval air stations of the Royal Navy and other airbases, including for detachments, in the United Kingdom:

1939

- Royal Naval Air Station Ford (HMS Peregrine), West Sussex, (23 October 1939 - 10 November 1939)
- disbanded - (10 November 1939)

1940 - 1953

- Royal Naval Air Station Donibristle (HMS Merlin), Fife, (1 December 1940 - 9 October 1953)
  - Inverness Airport, Scottish Highlands, (Detachment January 1942 - June 1946)
  - Royal Naval Air Station Lee-on-Solent (HMS Daedalus), Hampshire, (Detachment 20 July 1945 - 27 June 1946)
  - Royal Naval Air Station Eglinton (HMS Gannet), County Londonderry, (Detachment 1 August 1945 - 6 May1946)
- disbanded - (9 October 1953)

== Commanding officers ==
List of commanding officers of 782 Naval Air Squadron with date of appointment:

- Lieutenant Commander(A) A. Goodfellow, RNVR, from 1 December 1940
- Lieutenant Commander(A) W.T.D. Gardner, RNVR, from 21 March 1941
- Lieutenant Commander(A) G.H.G.S. Rayer, OBE, RNVR, from 7 December 1944
- Lieutenant Commander(A) J.K.N. Evans, RNVR, from 27 July 1945
- Lieutenant Commander(A) G.P. Barlass, MBE, RN, from 28 December 1945
- Lieutenant Commander(A) H. Whitaker, RNVR, from 1 October 1946
- Lieutenant Commander(A) T.E. Sargent, RN, from 2 December 1947
- Lieutenant Commander C.C. Thornton, RN, from 26 October 1949
- Lieutenant Commander V. Barrington, RN, from 1 April 1953
- disbanded 9 October 1953

Note: Abbreviation (A) signifies Air Branch of the RN or RNVR.
