= 799 Naval Air Squadron =

Inactive flying squadron of the Royal Navy's Fleet Air Arm

- Squadron badge
- Active: 1943–1944; 1945–1952
- Disbanded: 12 August 1952
- Country: United Kingdom
- Branch: Royal Navy
- Type: Fleet Air Arm Second Line Squadron
- Role: Pool Squadron; Flying Check and Conversion Refresher Unit
- Size: Squadron
- Part of: Fleet Air Arm
- Home station: See Naval air stations section for full list.
- Motto: To d'ey nicata (South African dialect for ‘May the right prevail’)
- Aircraft: See Aircraft flown section for full list.

Insignia
- Squadron Badge Description: Barry wavy of twelve white and blue, a rounde per fess black and blue charged with an eagle volant gold in the claws a torpedo white in chief three estoiles gold (1943)
- Identification Markings: uncoded (1943-1944); L8A+ & L9A+ (1945); 751-787 (1946); 100-154 & 200-206 (from May 1948); 201-235 (from January 1952)
- Fin Shore Codes: LP (1946); VL (from May 1948); MA (from January 1952)

799 Naval Air Squadron (799 NAS), also known as 799 Squadron, is an inactive Fleet Air Arm (FAA) naval air squadron of the United Kingdom’s Royal Navy (RN) which last disbanded during August 1952.

It initially formed as a Pool Squadron in South Africa during September 1943, sharing Fairey Albacore aircraft with 798 Naval Air Squadron and providing flying time for aircrew prior to front line squadron assignment, disbanding in June 1944.

It reformed in July 1945 as a Flying Check and Conversion Refresher Squadron at HMS Daedalus, RNAS Lee-on-Solent. Made up of three distinct flights, two of those operated away from RNAS Lee-on-Solent with a flight at HMS Siskin, RNAS Gosport, giving junior officers air experience, and another flight at HMS Dipper providing Supermarine Sea Otter conversion training. By May 1948 the whole unit had moved to HMS Heron, RNAS Yeovilton. In 1951, 799 Naval Air Squadron relocated to HMS Landrail, RNAS Machrihanish.

== History ==
=== Pool Squadron (1943-1944) ===
799 Naval Air Squadron formed at RNARY Wingfield (HMS Malagas), at Cape Town in South Africa on 10 September 1943, as a pool squadron. It was equipped with Fairey Albacore, a British single-engine biplane torpedo bomber aircraft. These were shared with 789 Naval Air Squadron, and its role was to give training to spare aircrew who were awaiting appointment to first line squadrons. 799 Naval Air Squadron initially disbanded on 20 June 1944.

=== Flying Check and Conversion Refresher Unit (1945-1952) ===
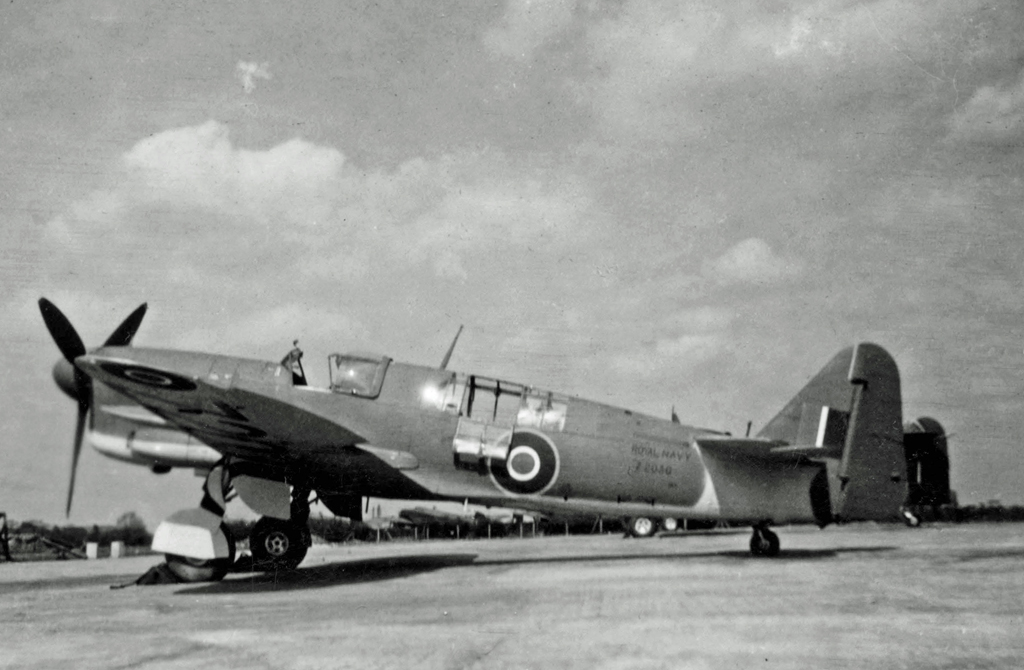
A Firefly FR.1; an example of the type operated by 799 Squadron

799 Naval Air Squadron reformed on 30 July 1945 at RNAS Lee-on-Solent (HMS Daedalus), Hampshire, as a flying check and conversion refresher squadron, out of 'B' Flight of 798 Naval Air Squadron and part of 781 Naval Air Squadron. At the end of 1945 the squadron consisted three Flights, ‘A’, ‘B’ and ‘C’. ‘A’ Flight was based with the squadron headquarters at RNAS Lee-on-Solent, ‘B’ Flight, equipped with a number of de Havilland Tiger Moth biplane training aircraft, provided junior Royal Navy and Royal Marines officers flying experience, at RNAS Gosport (HMS Siskin), Hampshire and ‘C’ Flight, at RNAS Henstridge (HMS Dipper), Somerset, gave refresher and conversion training on the Supermarine Sea Otter amphibious biplane.

Headquarters and ‘A’ Flight were joined by ‘C’ Flight and its courses at RNAS Lee-on-Solent in the New Year, these now incorporated some time in the aircraft carrier HMS Indefatigable. What was ‘X’ Flight from 781 Naval Air Squadron was also attached to the squadron and known as 799X Flight, or ‘Germany’ Flight. During April 1946, ‘B' Flight became 727 Naval Air Squadron, the Supermarine Sea Otter course then became 'B' Flight, and a new 'C’ Flight was formed from the Refresher Flying and Instrument Flying. June saw the ‘X’ Flight return to 781 Naval Air Squadron, upon the latter’s reformation.

In May 1948, 799 Naval Air Squadron moved to RNAS Yeovilton (HMS Heron), Somerset and became incorporated into the 50th Training Air Group. The squadron was titled the Flying Check and Conversion Refresher Unit and then in 1951, it became the Refresher Flying Training Unit and moved to RNAS Machrihanish (HMS Landrail), Argyll and Bute, Scotland. 799 Naval Air Squadron disbanded there on 12 August 1952.

== Aircraft flown ==
The squadron operated a variety of different aircraft and versions:

- Avro Anson C.XII multi-role aircraft (August - September 1943)
- Avro Anson I multi-role aircraft (August 1943 - May 1946)
- Fairey Albacore torpedo bomber (September 1943 - June 1944)
- Supermarine Seafire L Mk llc fighter aircraft (August 1945)
- Beech Traveller utility aircraft (August - November 1945)
- de Havilland Dominie short-haul airliner (August 1945 - March 1946)
- de Havilland Tiger Moth trainer aircraft (August 1945 - April 1946)
- Beech Expediter C.II trainer, transport and utility aircraft (August 1945 - June 1946)
- Airspeed Oxford trainer aircraft (August 1945 - July 1946)
- Supermarine Seafire III fighter aircraft (August 1945 - July 1947)
- Supermarine Sea Otter I/II amphibious air-sea rescue aircraft (August 1945 - December 1947)
- Fairey Firefly FR.I fighter and anti-submarine aircraft (August 1945 - August 1952)
- Supermarine Seafire F.XV fighter aircraft (October 1945 - November 1951)
- Dakota military transport aircraft (November 1945 - June 1946)
- North American Harvard III advanced trainer aircraft (December 1945 - July 1931)
- de Havilland Leopard Moth three-seat cabin monoplane (January - April 1946)
- Fairey Barracuda III torpedo and dive bomber (May 1946 - September 1947)
- North American Harvard Ilb advanced trainer aircraft (May 1946 - August 1952)
- Supermarine Seafire F.17 fighter aircraft (December 1947 - June 1952)
- Hawker Sea Fury F.10 fighter aircraft (September 1948 - October 1949)
- Hawker Sea Fury FB.11 fighter aircraft (May 1949 - November 1951)
- Fairey Firefly T.1 fighter and anti-submarine aircraft (May 1949 - August 1952)
- Blackburn Firebrand TF.5 strike fighter (September 1949 - July 1950)
- Fairey Firefly FR.4 fighter and anti-submarine aircraft (November 1949 - January 1952)
- Hawker Sea Fury T.20 fighter aircraft (April - May 1951)
- Fairey Firefly T.2 fighter and anti-submarine aircraft (December 1951 - August 1952)

== Assignments ==
799 Naval Air Squadron was assigned as needed to form part of larger unit:

- 50th Training Air Group (May 1948 - December 1951)

== Naval air stations and other airbases ==
799 Naval Air Squadron operated from a number of naval air stations of the Royal Navy, a Royal Navy capital ship and airbases overseas:

1943 - 1944

- Royal Naval Aircraft Repair Yard Wingfield (HMS Malagas), South Africa (10 September 1943 - 20 June 1944)
- disbanded - 20 June 1944

1945 - 1952

- HQ and 'A' Flight
  - Royal Naval Air Station Lee-on-Solent (HMS Daedalus), Hampshire, (30 July 1945 - 13 May 1948)
  - Royal Naval Air Station Yeovilton (HMS Heron), Somerset, (13 May 1948 - 3 December 1951)
  - Royal Naval Air Station Machrihanish (HMS Landrail), Argyll and Bute, (3 December 1951 - 12 August 1962)
- ’C' Flight (Sea Otter Course)
  - Royal Naval Air Station Henstridge (HMS Dipper), Dorset, (17 December 1945 - 23 January 1946)
  - Royal Naval Air Station Lee-on-Solent (HMS Daedalus), Hampshire, (23 January 1946 - 17 March 1946)
  - HMS Indefatigable (17 March 1946 - 7 April 1946)
  - Royal Naval Air Station Lee-on-Solent (HMS Daedalus), Hampshire, (7 April 1946 - 29 April 1946)
  - redesignated ‘B’ Flight 29 April 1946
- 'B' Flight (Sea Otter Course)
  - Royal Naval Air Station Lee-on-Solent (HMS Daedalus), Hampshire, (29 April 1946 - 27 May 1946)
  - HMS Indefatigable (27 May 1946 - 16 June 1946)
  - Royal Naval Air Station Lee-on-Solent (HMS Daedalus), Hampshire, (16 June 1946 - 21 June 1946)
  - HMS Indefatigable (21 June 1946 - 13 July 1946)
  - Royal Naval Air Station Lee-on-Solent (HMS Daedalus), Hampshire, (13 July - 28 August 1946)
- 'C’ Flight (Refresher Flying and Instrument Flying Course)
  - Royal Naval Air Station Lee-on-Solent (HMS Daedalus), Hampshire (29 April - 27 August 1946)
  - HMS Indefatigable - Detachment (6 - 18 September 1946)
- disbanded - 12 August 1952

=== 799B Squadron ===
'B' was based only at RNAS Gosport.

- Royal Naval Air Station Gosport (HMS Siskin), Hampshire, (17 December 1945 - 23 April 1946)
- became 727 Naval Air Squadron 23 April 1946

=== 799X Flight ===
ex-781X Flight.

- Wunstorf, Germany, (operating from Buckeburg, Germany) (31 July 1945 - 27 June 1946)
- became 781X Flight 27 June 1946

== Commanding officers ==
List of commanding officers of 799 Naval Air Squadron with date of appointment:

1943 - 1944

- Lieutenant Commander(A) W.T.E. White, SANF (V), from 10 September 1943

1945 - 1952

- Lieutenant Commander T.E. Sargent, RD, RNR, from 30 July 1945
- Lieutenant Commander N.R. Quill, RN, from 4 January 1946
- Lieutenant Commander P.W. Compton, DSC, RN, from 4 November 1946
- Lieutenant Commander J.B. Harrowar, DFC, RNR, from 1 July 1947
- Lieutenant Commander J.N. Ball, DSC, RN, from 16 January 1948
- Lieutenant T.J. Harris, RN, from 13 May 1948
- Lieutenant J.D. Nun, RN, from 28 October 1948
- Lieutenant K.G. Talbot, RN, from 6 June 1949
- Lieutenant Commander G.R. Callingham, RN, from 26 April 1950
- Lieutenant Commander B.H. Harriss, RN, from 1 March 1951
- Lieutenant Commander G.F. Birch, RN, from 12 November 1951
- disbanded - 12 August 1952

=== 799B Squadron ===
- Lieutenant A.M. Dennis, RN, from 17 December 1945
- became 727 Naval Air Squadron 23 April 1946

=== 799X Flight Germany ===
- Lieutenant de vaisseau A.E. Bret, FN, from 31 July 1945
- became 781X Flight 27 June 1946

Note: Abbreviation (A) signifies Air Branch of the RN or RNVR.
