= 781 Naval Air Squadron =

Inactive flying squadron of the Royal Navy's Fleet Air Arm

- Squadron badge
- Active: 1940–1945; 1946–1981
- Disbanded: 31 March 1981
- Country: United Kingdom
- Branch: Royal Navy
- Type: Fleet Air Arm Second Line Squadron
- Role: Communications Squadron
- Size: Squadron
- Part of: Fleet Air Arm
- Home station: See Naval air stations section for full list.
- Motto: Reliability
- Aircraft: See Aircraft flown section for full list.
- Decorations: Boyd Trophy 1959

Insignia
- Squadron Badge Description: Barry wavy of eight white and blue, a wheel winged gold (1952)
- Identification Markings: L8A+, L9A+ and L0A+ (from 1942); L1A+ (Beaufighter 1943); 101-167 (Seafire from 1946); 201-293 (various types from 1946); 301-306 (Sea Otter from 1946); 441-453 (Meteor / Sea Vampire from 1946); 601-608 (Oxford from 1946); 850-869 (transport types from 1946); 740-755 (all types from January 1956); 814-829 (all types from July 1965)
- Fin Shore Codes: LP (Seafire, Sea Otter & transport types from June 1946); LP (all types from January 1956); LS (all types from July 1964)

781 Naval Air Squadron (781 NAS), also referred to as 781 Squadron, is an inactive Fleet Air Arm (FAA) naval air squadron of the United Kingdom’s Royal Navy (RN) which last disbanded at the end of March 1981. Planned as a Reserve Amphibious Bomber Reconnaissance squadron, it formed as a Communications Unit in March 1940 and operated a large variety of aircraft. It provided a Bristol Beaufighter conversion course which eventually became 798 Naval Air Squadron and also had a ‘B’ Flight at Heathrow and then Heston aerodromes before becoming 701 Naval Air Squadron. After the Allied invasion of Normandy the squadron flew to various Royal Navy units on the continent and established an ‘X’ Flight based in France and then Germany. In July 1945 the squadron disbanded into 782 Naval Air Squadron although the ‘X’ Flight was moved to 799 Naval Air Squadron.

It reformed out of ‘B’ Flight of 799 Naval Air Squadron in June 1946, as the Southern Communications Squadron and re-acquired the ‘X’ Flight. The squadron performed many roles and picked up refresher flying and by 1952 had a Communications section, a Training and Miscellaneous section, an Instrument Flying Examining section along with Search and Rescue, and later in the year a Junior Officers Air Course (JOAC) Flight was formed. During the mid-fifties it provided practice flying for Admiralty pilots and in the late-fifties the JOAC became 702 Naval Air Squadron.

The squadron picked up the Boyd Trophy for efficiency with the Communications role in 1959 and also that year saw the first helicopters, Westland Whirlwind, arrived on strength. Ten years later Westland Wessex replaced the Westland Whirlwind helicopters and the squadron provided surveillance and fisheries protection flights around the United Kingdom.

== History ==
=== Communications Unit (1940–1945) ===
781 Naval Air Squadron formed on 20 March 1940, as a communications squadron at HMS Daedalus, RNAS Lee-on-Solent, although originally intended as a Reserve Amphibious Bomber Reconnaissance squadron to be equipped with six Supermarine Walrus amphibian aircraft. It was initially equipped with a variety of different aircraft types: de Havilland Hornet Moth, a cabin biplane trainer and tourer aircraft, Fairey Fulmar, designed as carrier-based reconnaissance/fighter aircraft, Fairey Swordfish biplane torpedo bomber and Supermarine Walrus amphibious maritime patrol aircraft.

The squadron later received Avro Anson multi-role aircraft, de Havilland Dominie, a short-haul 6–8 passenger biplane airliner, Lockheed Hudson a light bomber and coastal reconnaissance aircraft, Airspeed Oxford twin-engine trainer aircraft, Percival Proctor radio trainer and communications aircraft, de Havilland Tiger Moth biplane trainer aircraft and Percival Vega Gull, a four-seater touring, military trainer and communications aircraft.

During June 1943 the squadron received a small number of Bristol Beaufighter II, multirole combat aircraft, and then proceeded to run a conversion course, however, four months later this split off during October and formed part of 798 Naval Air Squadron, but training and refresher flying were added to the squadrons remit.

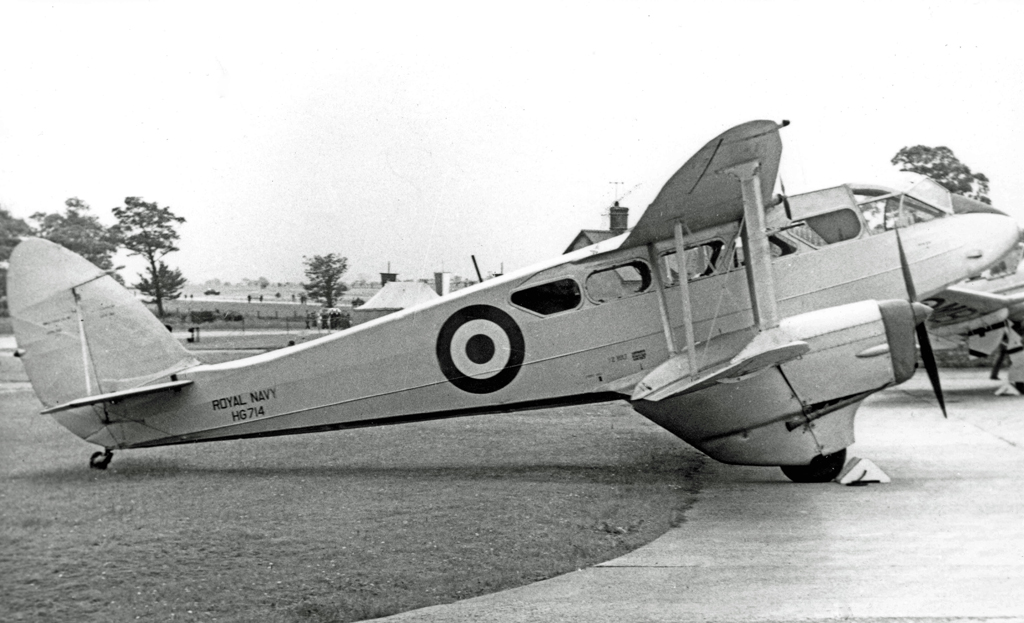
de Havilland Dominie, an example of the type used by 781 NAS

A detachment, ‘B’ Flight’, was based at Heathrow from February 1944 and was equipped with Fairey Swordfish and a Percival Proctor. It was Fairey's Great West Aerodrome, for the use of the Admiralty, before moving to Heston by October and then became 701 Naval Air Squadron in April 1945.

After the Normandy landings, an Avro Anson was based at Rochester for the Commander-in-Chief, The Nore. The Allied Naval Commander, Admiral Sir Bertram Home Ramsay KCB, KBE, MVO, had a Lockheed Hudson as his personal aircraft. From early July 1944, 781 NAS flew to various airstrips on the Continent for Royal Navy units using de Havilland Dominie, Lockheed Hudson and Airspeed Oxford aircraft. Later an ‘X' Flight was based at Toussus-le-Noble from September and the Flight moved into Germany in June 1945. On 31 July 1945, 781 Naval Air Squadron disbanded into 782 and 799 Naval Air Squadrons. Three de Havilland Dominie aircraft remained at Lee-on-Solent as a detached Flight of 782 Naval Air Squadron, and the Continental detachment became 'X' Flight of 799 Naval Air Squadron.

=== Communications Unit (1946–1981) ===
781 Naval Air Squadron reformed at HMS Daedalus, RNAS Lee-on-Solent, from ‘B’ Flight of 799 Naval Air Squadron, in June 1946. It was again designated a Communications Unit (known as the Southern Communications Squadron). It was equipped with de Havilland Dominie and Beech Expeditor, a training and utility aircraft, with a Search and Rescue Flight operating Supermarine Sea Otter, an amphibious aircraft. The ‘X’ Flight which was now equipped with Avro Anson XIX and Beech Expeditor, and operated on the Continent, returned to 781 NAS and then later disbanded during November 1947.

The squadron was providing communications aircraft for VIPs, operating an Instrument Examining Flight along with a Bad Weather Flying Training Flight (which involved flying in adverse weather conditions, day and night), by the autumn of 1951. It had previously provided a short detachment with Beech Expeditor C.2 at RNAS Ford (HMS Peregrine) between 24 - 31 May 1950. Then in August 1952, when 799 Naval Air Squadron disbanded, it provided refresher flying again and 781 NAS consisted Communications, Training and Miscellancous, and Instrument Flying Examining sections, and was operating with Percival Sea Prince, a British light transport aircraft, Beech Expeditor, de Havilland Dominie, Fairey Firefly, a carrier-borne fighter and anti-submarine aircraft, North American Harvard, an American advanced trainer aircraft, Hawker Sea Fury, a British fighter aircraft, Gloster Meteor, a British jet fighter and Airspeed Oxford aircraft. Although when the Supermarine Sea Otter aircraft were withdrawn in the October, the unit no longer provided Search and Rescue duties.

It formed a Junior Officers Air Course (JOAC) Flight in November 1952, equipped with four Fairey Firefly, two Gloster Meteor, an Avro Anson and a Percival Sea Prince. During September 1954 an ‘Admiralty Flight’ was formed of two Fairey Firefly and four Hawker Sea Fury aircraft, enabling flying practice for Admiralty pilots and staff. April 1955 saw the initial de Havilland Sea Devon aircraft, a transport and communications version for the Royal Navy, of the de Havilland Dove short-haul airliner, on the squadrons inventory. The JOAC Flight had replaced all aircraft except the Percival Sea Prince with de Havilland Sea Vampire, a navalised de Havilland Vampire jet fighter and Boulton Paul Sea Balliol advanced trainer aircraft and in September 1957 it was redesignated 702 Naval Air Squadron. 781 NAS took over the role of the Northern Communications Squadron in 1958.

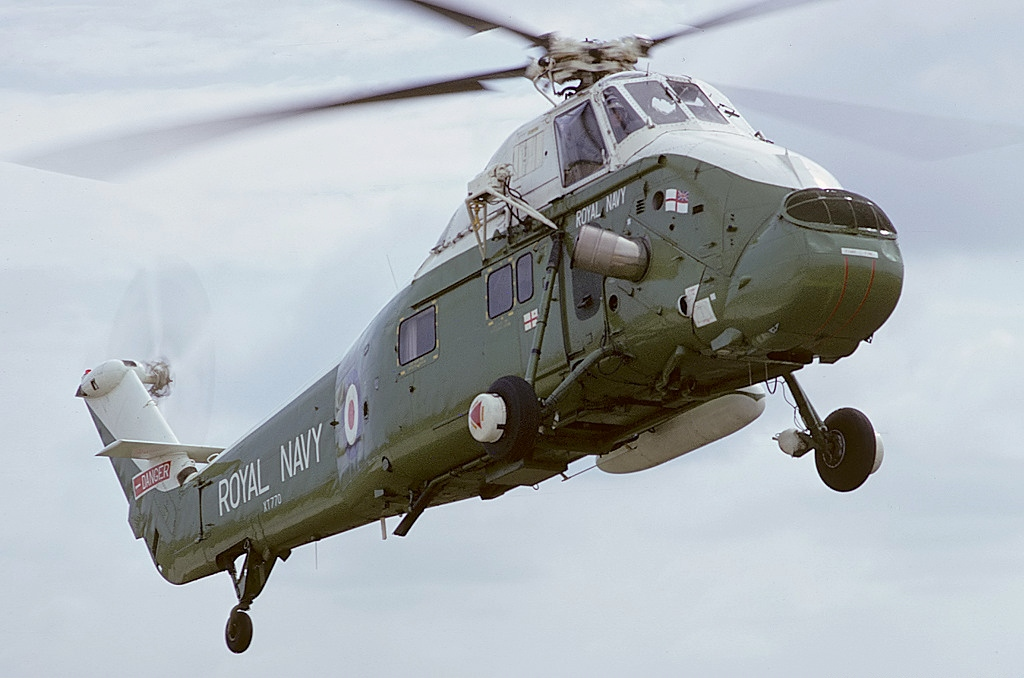
A Westland Wessex HU.5 of 781 NAS in flight during 1975

1959 saw the squadron awarded the Boyd Trophy for its efficiency in carrying out communications flights. It also saw the initial Westland Whirlwind utility helicopter arrive. These were followed by de Havilland Sea Heron aircraft, a transport and communications version for the Royal Navy of the de Havilland Heron airliner, in 1961, and by 1967 the squadron consisted five de Havilland Sea Devon, three de Havilland Sea Heron and two Westland Whirlwind, along with a Hawker Sea Hawk jet day fighter aircraft, for use by the Flag Officer, Air, Home.

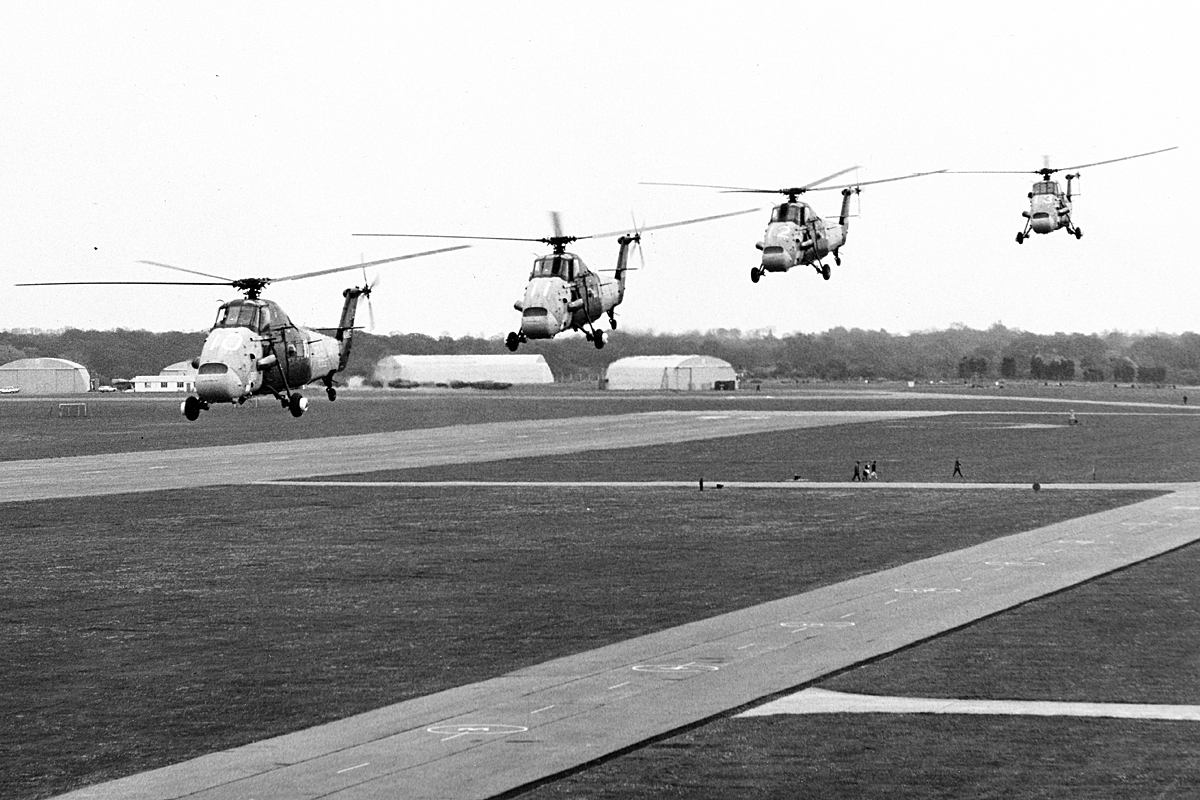
All 4 SAR Flight 781 Squadron airborne, Westland Wessex HU.5

The Westland Whirlwind of the VIP Flight were withdrawn during 1969 and replaced with Westland Wessex HU.5, an anti-submarine warfare and utility helicopter. The 1970s saw 781 NAS undertake surveillance and fisheries protection flights and it operated these out of various airfields around the United Kingdom, including Stornoway, on the Isle of Lewis, in Scotland, RAF Manston, in Kent and RAF Valley, on the island of Anglesey, Wales. It also had a de Havilland Sea Devon based at Belfast between 1972 - 1973 and at Prestwick, in South Ayrshire, Scotland, between 1974 - 1975. Just prior to disbanding the squadron was operating with Westland Wessex HU.5 for both Search and Rescue and VIP duties, de Havilland Sea Heron, de Havilland Sea Devon and a de Havilland Chipmunk, a primary trainer aircraft. 781 Naval Air Squadron disbanded on 31 March 1981.

== Aircraft flown ==
The squadron operated a variety of different aircraft and versions. There are around sixty different marks of aircraft known to have been operated by the squadron between 1940 & 1981:

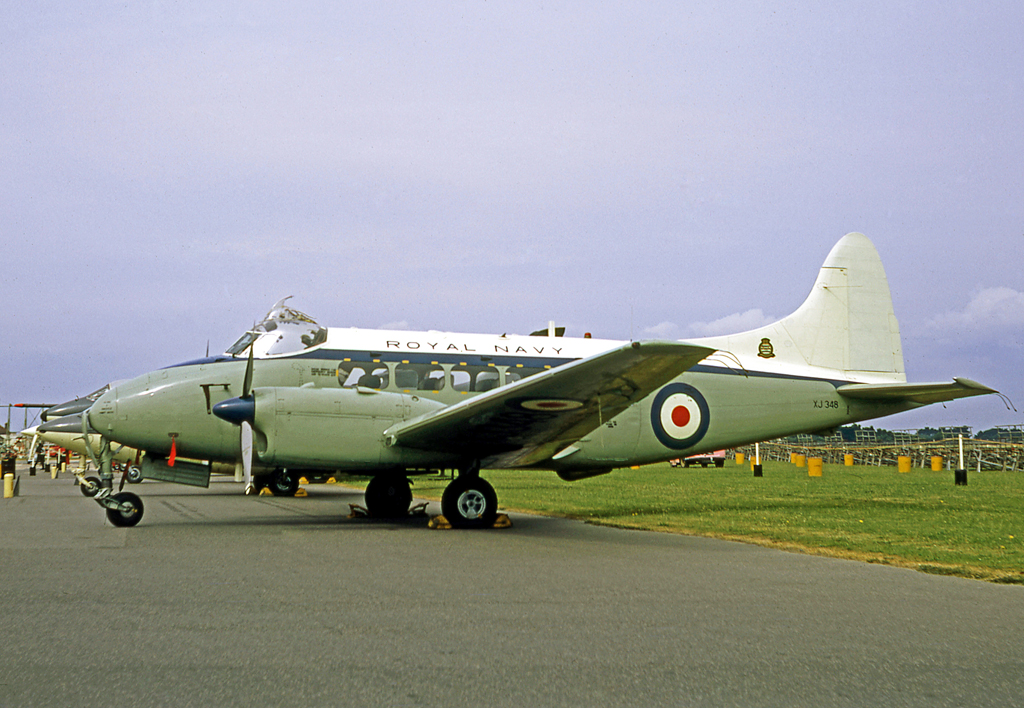
De Havilland DH.104 Sea Devon C.20 of 781 Naval Air Squadron at RNAS Lee-on-Solent in 1969

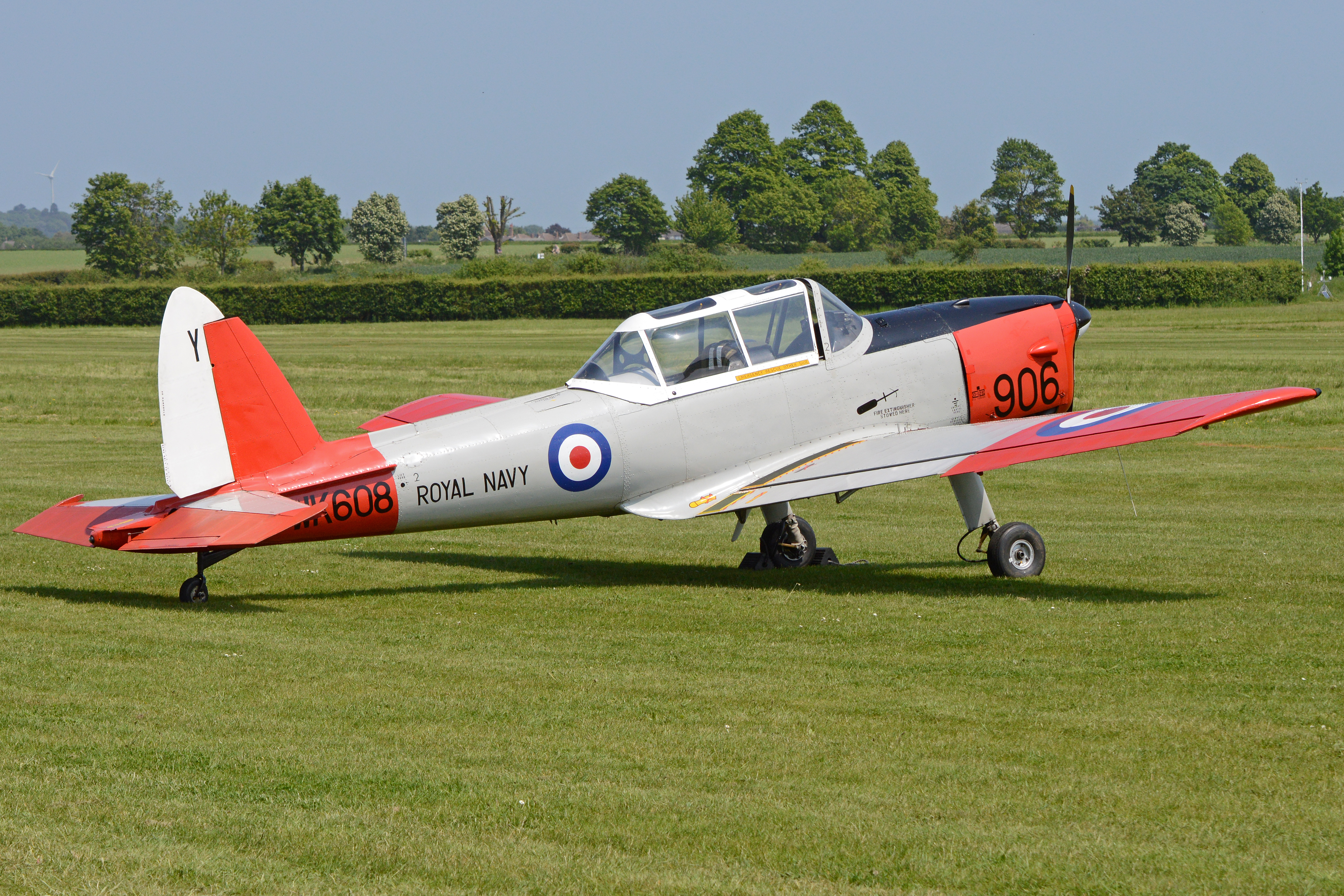
de Havilland Canada DHC-1 Chipmunk

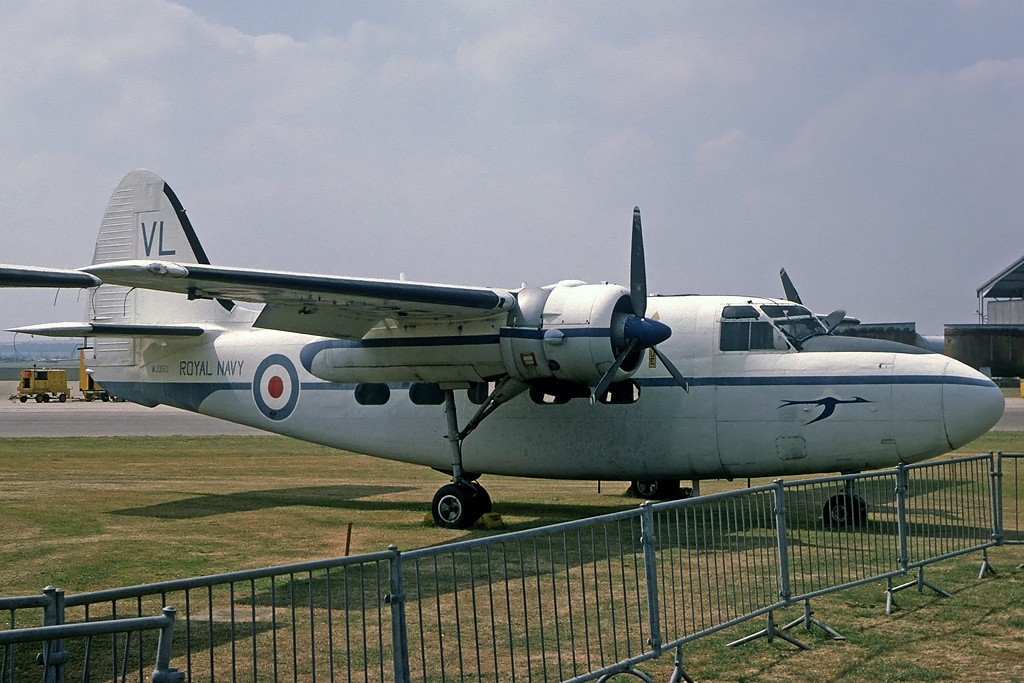
Percival Sea Prince C2

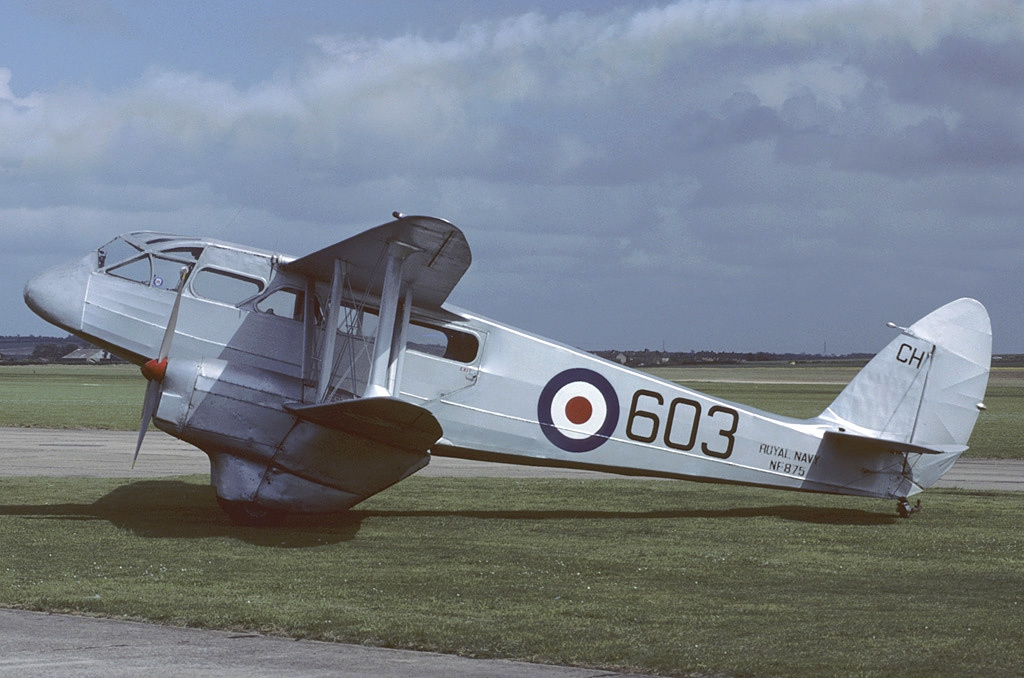
de Havilland DH-89A Dominie

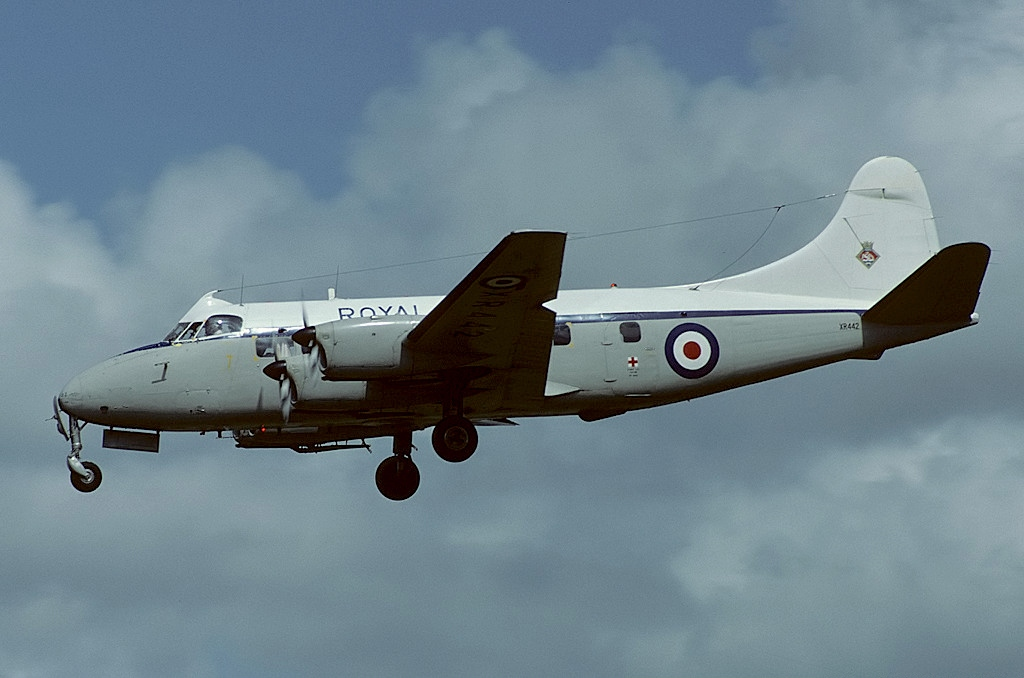
de Havilland DH-114-2B Sea Heron C1

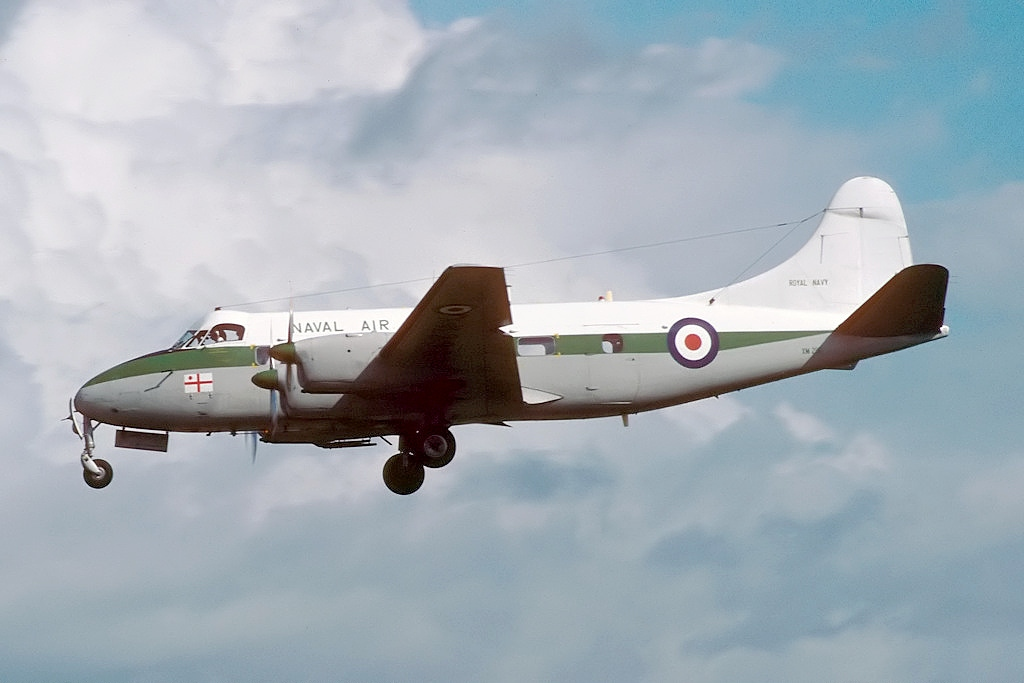
de Havilland DH-114 Heron C4

- Miles Falcon cabin monoplane (May 1940)
- de Havilland Hornet Moth trainer aircraft (May 1940 - January 1943)
- Fairey Swordfish I (September 1940 - June 1944)
- Fairey Fulmar I torpedo bomber (September 1940 - March 1942)
- Supermarine Walrus amphibious maritime patrol aircraft (September 1940 - March 1944)
- Percival Petrel Q.6 military communications aircraft (December 1940 - October 1942)
- de Havilland Fox Moth passenger aircraft (May 1941 - )
- Airspeed Envoy transport aircraft (May - September 1941)
- Percival Vega Gull military trainer and communications aircraft (July 1941 - August 1943)
- Avro 652 airliner (March 1942)
- Percival Proctor radio trainer/communications aircraft (March 1942 - October 1944)
- Vought Chesapeake I dive bomber (December 1942)
- Handley Page H.P.54 Harrow heavy bomber (February - July 1943)
- Airspeed Oxford training aircraft (February 1943 - July 1945, March 1948 - May 1954)
- North American Harvard III advanced trainer aircraft (April - May 1953)
- Bristol Beaufighter Mk.IIF night fighter (June - October 1943)
- Vought Kingfisher observation floatplane (July 1943 - August 1944)
- de Havilland Tiger Moth trainer aircraft (December 1943 - July 1945, August 1960 - March 1972)
- de Havilland Dominie short-haul airliner (January 1944 - July 1945, May 1946 - June 1963)
- Beech Traveller utility aircraft (May 1944 - July 1945)
- Lockheed Hudson Mk IV Bomber, reconnaissance, transport and maritime patrol aircraft (September 1944 - July 1945)
- Avro Anson Mk I multi-role trainer aircraft (February - July 1945)
- Supermarine Sea Otter amphibious air-sea rescue aircraft (March - July 1945)
- Stinson Reliant liaison and training aircraft (March - July 1945)
- Beech Expeditor trainer, transport and utility aircraft (April - July 1945)
- Fairey Firefly FR.Mk 4 fighter-reconnaissance aircraft (May 1946 - December 1949)
- Supermarine Sea Otter I/II amphibious air-sea rescue aircraft (May 1946 - October 1952)
- Beech Expeditor C.2 trainer, transport and utility aircraft (May 1946 - January 1955)
- Avro Anson C.XII multi-role trainer aircraft (June - November 1946)
- Supermarine Seafire F Mk 46 fighter aircraft (March - October 1947)
- North American Harvard IIb advanced trainer aircraft (November 1947 - February 1954)
- Hawker Sea Fury F.10 fighter-bomber (October 1948 - March 1950)
- Supermarine Seafire F Mk XVII fighter aircraft (May - October 1949)
- Fairey Firefly FR.1 fighter-reconnaissance aircraft (September 1949 - March 1954)
- Fairey Firefly T.Mk 1 trainer aircraft (November 1949 - January 1954)
- Taylorcraft Auster I liaison aircraft (December 1949 - February 1950)
- Supermarine Seafire F Mk XV fighter aircraft (December 1949 - February 1950)
- Hawker Sea Fury T.20 trainer aircraft (May 1950 - September 1954)
- Fairey Firefly T.Mk 2 trainer aircraft (October 1950 - November 1956)
- Gloster Meteor T.7 jet trainer aircraft (May 1951 - June 1954)
- Percival Sea Prince C.1 transport aircraft (July 1950 - February 1965)
- Avro Anson Mk I multi-role trainer aircraft (December 1951 - September 1953)
- Fairey Swordfish III torpedo bomber (March 1953 - November 1963)
- Percival Sea Prince C.2 trainer aircraft (July 1953 - June 1961)
- Percival Sea Prince T.1 transport aircraft (September 1953 - September 1957)
- de Havilland Sea Vampire T.22 jet trainer aircraft (October 1953 - December 1964)
- de Havilland Vampire T.11 jet trainer aircraft (November 1953 - May 1954)
- Hawker Sea Fury FB.11 fighter-bomber (December 1953 - February 1955)
- Boulton Paul Sea Balliol T.21 trainer aircraft (April 1954 - December 1958)
- de Havilland Sea Devon C.20 transport and communications (April 1955 - March 1981)
- Westland Whirlwind HAS.22 anti-submarine helicopter (January 1959 - Match 1970)
- de Havilland Sea Heron C.1 transport aircraft (July 1961 - March 1981)
- Westland Whirlwind HAR.1 search and rescue helicopter (July 1961 - March 1962)
- Hawker Sea Hawk FGA.6 Fighter/Ground attack (May 1962 - May 1967)
- Westland Whirlwind HAR.3 search and rescue helicopter (July - September 1963)
- Westland Whirlwind HAS.7 anti-submarine helicopter (May 1965)
- Westland Wessex HU.5 transport helicopter (May 1969 - March 1981)
- de Havilland Heron C.4 transport aircraft (September 1969 - June 1970)
- de Havilland Canada DHC-1 Chipmunk T.10 trainer aircraft (May 1971 - March 1981)
- de Havilland Heron CC.4 transport aircraft (July 1972 - March 1981)

=== 781X Flight ===
X Flight, 781 Naval Air Squadron, operated a variety of different aircraft and versions.

- Avro Anson C.XIX multi-role trainer aircraft (June 1946 - July 1947)
- Douglas Dakota military transport aircraft (June 1946)
- de Havilland Dominie short-haul airliner (May - July 1945)
- Beech Expediter C.II trainer, transport and utility aircraft (June 1946 - November 1947)
- Lockheed Hudson Mk V bomber, reconnaissance, transport and maritime patrol aircraft (May 1944 - January 1945)

== Naval air stations ==
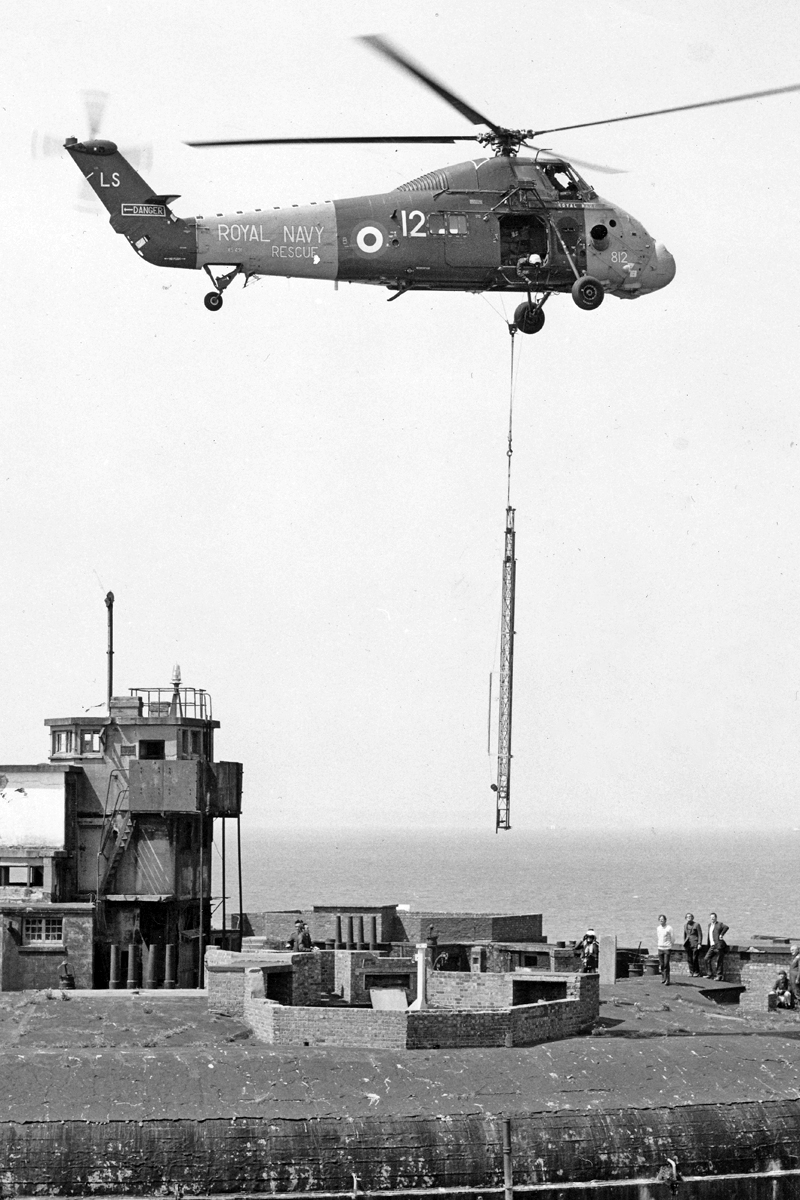
Westland Wessex HU.5, 781 Squadron, Lee-On-Solent SAR Flight

781 Naval Air Squadron operated from a number of naval air stations of the Royal Navy and a number of other airbases, including for detachments, in the United Kingdom:

1940 - 1944

- Royal Naval Air Station Lee-on-Solent (HMS Daedalus), Hampshire, (20 March 1940 - 31 July 1945)
  - 'B' Flight: Heathrow, London, (17 February 1944, to Heston, London, by October 1944, became 701 Squadron 18 April 1945)
- disbanded (31 July 1945)

1946 - 1981

- Royal Naval Air Station Lee-on-Solent (HMS Daedalus), Hampshire, (27 June 1946 - 31 March 1981)
  - Royal Naval Air Station Ford (HMS Peregrine), West Sussex, (Detachment 24-31 May 1950)
  - Belfast, County Antrim, (Detachment September 1972 - August 1973)
  - Royal Naval Air Station Prestwick (HMS Gannet), South Ayrshire, (Detachment January 1974 - July 1975)
- disbanded (31 March 1981)

=== 781X Flight ===
X Flight, 781 Naval Air Squadron, operated from a number of airbases:

- Royal Naval Air Station Lee-on-Solent (HMS Daedalus), Hampshire, (May 1944 - 3 May 1945)
- Toussus-le-Noble, France, (3 May 1945 - 11 June 1945)
- Wunstorf, Germany,
  - (operating from Royal Air Force Bückeburg), Germany, (11 June 1945 - 31 July 1945)
- became 799X Flight (31 July 1945)

== Commanding officers ==
List of commanding officers of 781 Naval Air Squadron with date of appointment:

1940 - 1945

- Lieutenant Commander E.J.E. Burt, RN, from 20 March 1940
- Lieutenant Commander(A) A.C.S. Irwin, RNVR, from 7 September 1940
- Lieutenant Commander(A) J.M. Keene-Miller, RNVR, from 15 February 1941
- Lieutenant Commander(A) Sir George James Ernest Lewis Bt, RNVR, from 7 November 1941
- Lieutenant Commander(A) W.B. Caldwell, RNVR, from 1 December 1944
- disbanded - 31 July 1945

1946 - 1981

- Not identified, from 27 June 1946
- Lieutenant Commander(E) P.F. Clayton, RN, from 19 August 1946
- Lieutenant(A) L.W.A. Barrington, RN, from 7 July 1948
- Lieutenant Commander D.L. Stirling, RN, from 3 July 1950
- Lieutenant Commander D.H. Richards, RN, from 9 July 1953
- Lieutenant Commander M.W. Rudorf, DSC, RN, from 28 April 1954
- Lieutenant Commander J.S. Barnes, RN, from 13 July 1957
- Lieutenant Commander R.C. Stock, RN, from 22 November 1960
- Lieutenant Commander S.W. Birse, OBE, DSC, RN, from 16 November 1962
- Lieutenant Commander R.A. Shilcock, RN, from 22 March 1965
- Lieutenant Commander A. McK Sinclair, RN, from 27 September 1967
- Lieutenant Commander P.G.W. Morris, RN, from 3 April 1969
- Lieutenant Commander D.M. Rouse, MBE, RN 15 May 1970
- Lieutenant Commander R. Garvin, RN, from 14 March 1975
- Lieutenant Commander R. King, RN, from 4 March 1977
- Lieutenant Commander G.D. Varley, RN, from 26 May 1979
- disbanded - 31 March 1981

=== 781X Flight ===
List of commanding officers of X Flight, 787 Naval Air Squadron, with date of appointment:

- Lieutenant de vaisseau A.E. Bret, FN 3 May 1945 (to 799 Naval Air Squadron 31 July 1945)
- Lieutenant de vaisseau A.E. Bret, FN, from 27 June 1946
- Lieutenant Commander(A) T.E. Sargent, RN, from 1 August 1946
- disbanded - 17 November 1947

Note: Abbreviation (A) signifies Air Branch of the RN or RNVR.
