= Beechcraft Model 17 Staggerwing =

American single engine cabin biplane

Model 17 Staggerwing
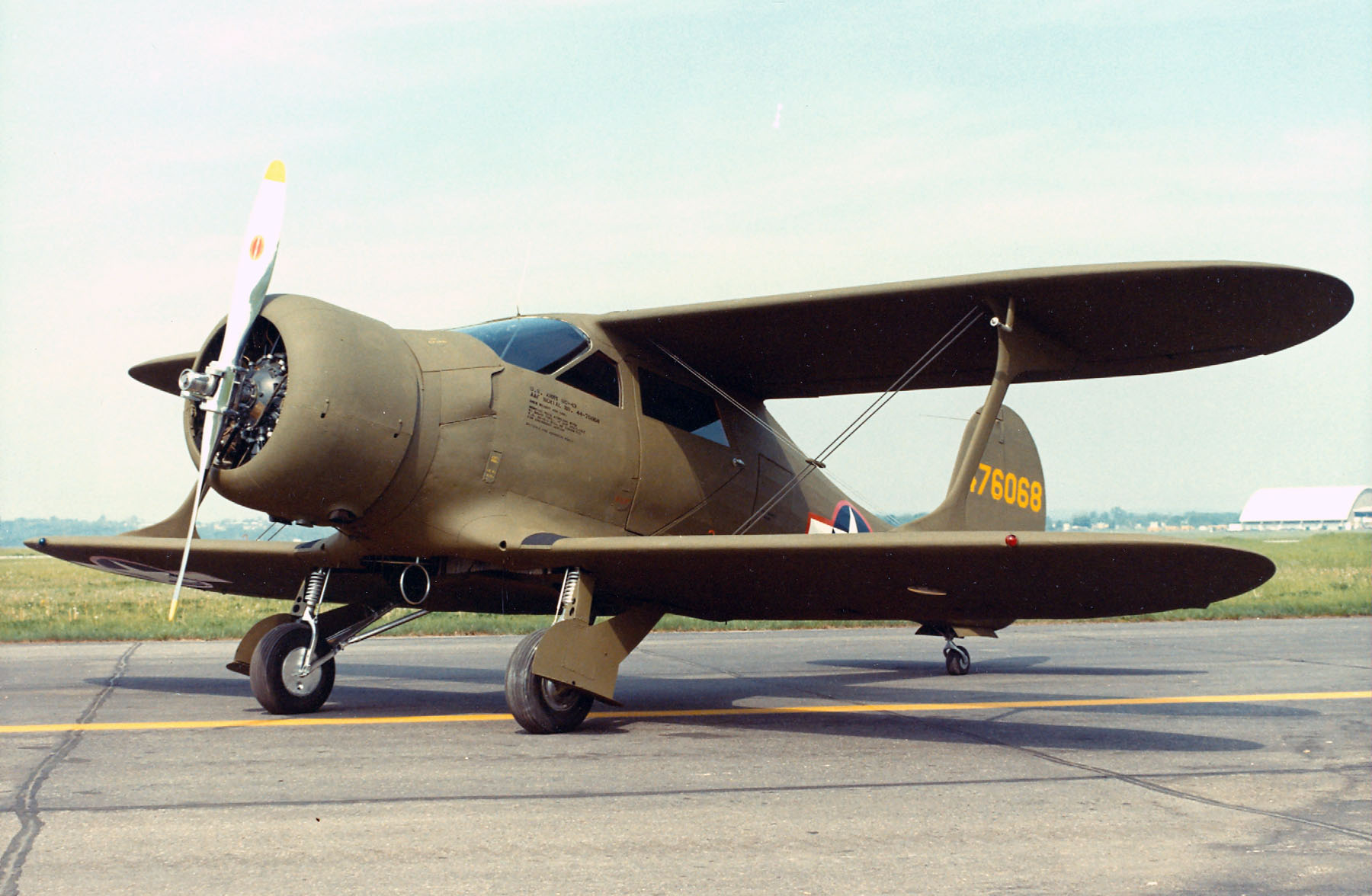
- Beechcraft UC-43

General information
- Type: Utility aircraft
- National origin: United States
- Manufacturer: Beech Aircraft Corporation
- Primary users: United States Army Air Forces United States Navy
- Number built: 785

History
- Manufactured: 1932–1948
- Introduction date: 1933
- First flight: November 4, 1932

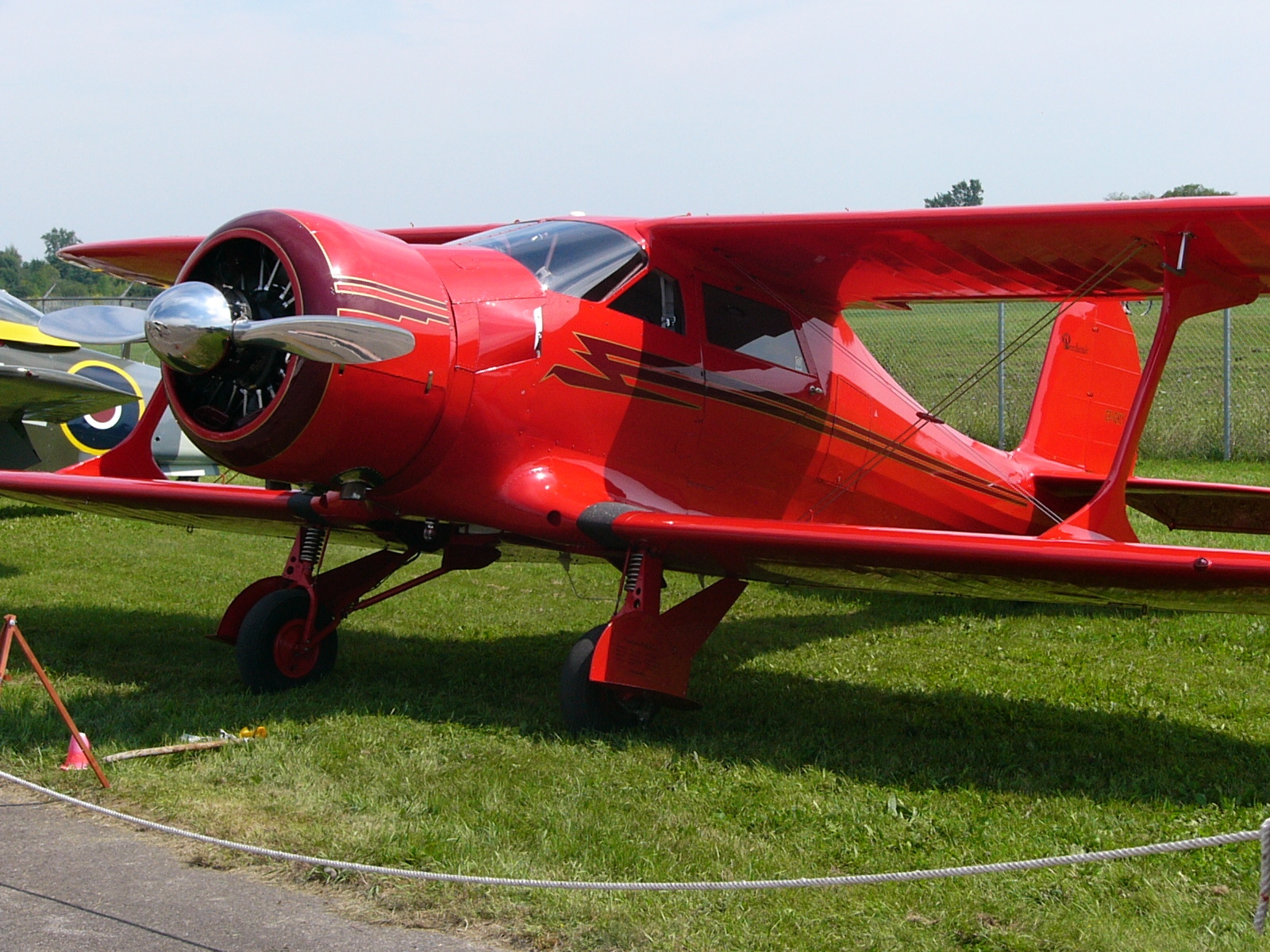
Vintage Wings of Canada Beechcraft D17S Staggerwing

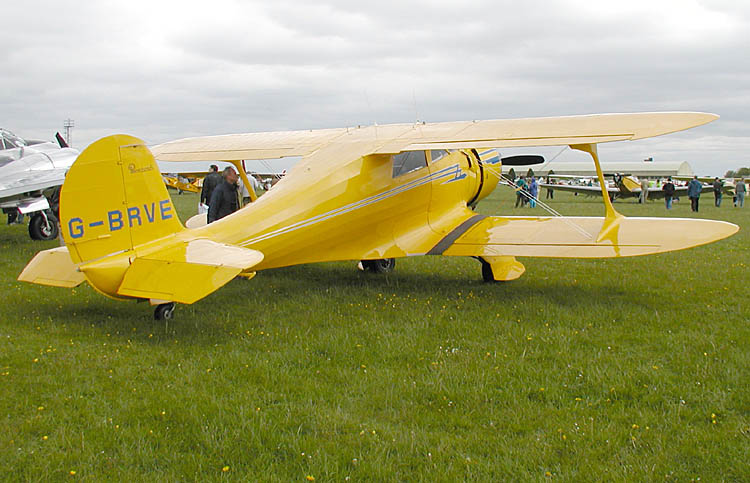
1943 Beech D17S Staggerwing

The Beechcraft Model 17 Staggerwing is an biplane with an atypical negative wing stagger (the lower wing is farther forward than the upper wing) that was designed and produced by the American aviation firm Beech Aircraft Corporation. It was the fastest commercial aircraft of the mid 1930s.

The Model 17 was developed during the Great Depression as Beech Aircraft's first aircraft. It conducted its maiden flight in 1932, and was commonly marketed towards the civilian market. Early sales were limited due to its relatively high construction costs, but subsequent redesigns (introducing retractable landing gear and aerodynamic improvements amongst other changes) increased the aircraft's top speed and sales alike. The definitive variant was the Model D17, which was introduced in the latter half of the 1930s. In the civil sector, the Model 17 was typically used as a business and air racing amoongst other purposes.

During the late 1930s and early-to-mid 1940s, various military air wings opted to procure the type. Accordingly, the Model 17 was operated as a bomber by the Spanish Republican Air Force during the Spanish Civil War and as an air ambulance by the Chinese Nationalist Air Force during the Second Sino-Japanese War. During World War II, it was operated by the Allies, sometimes having been supplied under the Lend-Lease scheme. Typical military roles include light personnel transport, maritime patrol, and liaison. After the conflict, production of the Model 17 proceeded for a time for the civilian market until 1948, by which point 785 aircraft had been produced.

== Development ==
In 1932, Walter H. Beech, formerly head of the aircraft manufacturer Travel Air, left Curtiss-Wright, which had purchased Travel Air in 1929, to set up a new company, Beech Aircraft Corporation, based in Wichita, Kansas. Beech promptly took on the aircraft designer Ted A. Wells from Curtiss-Wright, who played a leading role in the company's first project; designated the Model 17, it was a fast biplane with an enclosed cabin designed to meet the needs of business executives. This aircraft, which would become popularly known as the "Staggerwing", was based on a design drafted by Wells while working at Curtiss-Wright, but had been dismissed by the Curtiss-Wright board. Its development was viewed as a considerable gamble for the firm, which came close to bankruptcy as a consiquence of the Great Depression.

Perhaps the most destinctive feature of the Model 17 was its unusual negative stagger wing configuration (the upper wing staggered behind the lower) and unique shape, which maximized pilot visibility and was intended to reduce interference drag between the wings (although it was later found to have negligible effect). Beech attributed this wing as having resulted in the aircraft possessing relatively gentle stall characteristics. Not all of the aircraft's handling characteristics were positive, being somewhat difficult to land as a consiquence of its nose-heavy configuration and relatively tall landing gear, which increased the likilihood of performing ground loops. This would be subsiquently resolved via the adoption of shorter landing gear and adjusting the angle of incidence of the horizontal stabilizer so that the tail would remain down during landings.

The wing structure was composed of steel tubing; similarly, the fuselage construction consisted of a welded steel tube frame that was faired with wood formers and stringers. The exterior was covered with fabric. This construction was fairly complex and required substantial man-hours to complete a single aircraft. Consiquently, the unit cost was relatively high, which has been attributed for the type's poor early sales performance.

On November 4, 1932, the Model 17 conducted its maiden flight. However, of the Model 17R, the first series production version, only two aircraft would ever be produced. In 1934, Beech responded with the Model B17L, a revised version that retained the earlier model's general design while enacting some compromises in the aircraft's performance with the aim of bolstering its commercial prospects. Specifically, it was provided with retractable conventional landing gear (which was an uncommon arrangement in this era) that was furnished with fairings that enclosed the upper portion of the wheels. The aerodynamic efficiency of this undercarriage, combined with careful streamlining, lightweight construction, and a relatively powerful Wright R-760 radial engine (capable of producing up to 420 hp), enabled this model of the aircraft to achieve a top speed of 175 mph aand a landing speed of 45 mph.

Later-built aircraft would be capable of attaining maximum speeds in excess of 200 MPH; this boosted performance was not accompanied by a disadvantageously high landing speed, which remained no higher than 65 MPH. Seeking to maximise the aircraft's speed potential, Beechcraft produced a pair of Model Al7s, which were equipped with a fixed landing gear and powered by Wright R-1820 Cyclone radial engines that could produce up to 710 hp. These specific aircraft could achieve a maximum speed of 250 mph, thus making them the fastest commercial aircraft of the era.

During its heyday, the type was frequently used as an executive aircraft, akin to a business aircraft; its primary competition were the Waco Custom Cabin and Waco Standard Cabin series of biplanes.

In the mid-1930s, Beech undertook a major redesign of the aircraft, to create the Model D17 Staggerwing. Amongst the changes were the adoptiong of a lengthened fuselage that improved the aircraft's landing characteristics by increasing the leverage of the elevator, the relocating of the ailerons to the upper wings (which prevented them from interfering with the airflow over the flaps), and the removl of the hand-operated wheel-based braking in favour of a simpler arrangement that was linked to the rudder pedals. The Model D17 would prove to be the definitive model, being produced in greater volume than any other.

During the early 1940s, the company worked on a special initiative that used the Model 17 as the basis for a proposed fighter and ground attack aircraft. Envisioned as being armed primarily with a 37 mm cannon alongside a pair of machine guns, a 1,000 hp inline engine and a new streamlined nose amongst other changes, work on this project was ultimately abandoned in favour of other projects.

Between April 1936 through May 1940, there were six Model 17 fatal accidents involving midair breakups that were attributed to weather conditions and structural failures, later determined to be caused by flutter of the ailerons and wings. The CAA Bureau of Safety Regulation initially issued an edict to restrict maximum airspeed and instrument flight, which was later replaced by a safety bulletin requiring lead balance weights to be added to the ailerons and flaps, and plywood panels to the outboard portion of the wings to increase torsional stiffness of the wing tip section.

== Operational history ==
Sales began slowly. The first Staggerwings' high price tag (between US$14,000 and $17,000, depending on engine size) scared off potential buyers in an already depressed civil aircraft market. Only 18 Model 17s were sold during 1933, the first year of production, but sales steadily increased. Each Staggerwing was custom-built by hand. The luxurious cabin, trimmed in leather and mohair, held up to five passengers. Eventually, the Staggerwing captured a substantial share of the passenger aircraft market. By the start of World War II, Beechcraft had sold more than 424 Model 17s.

=== Air racing ===
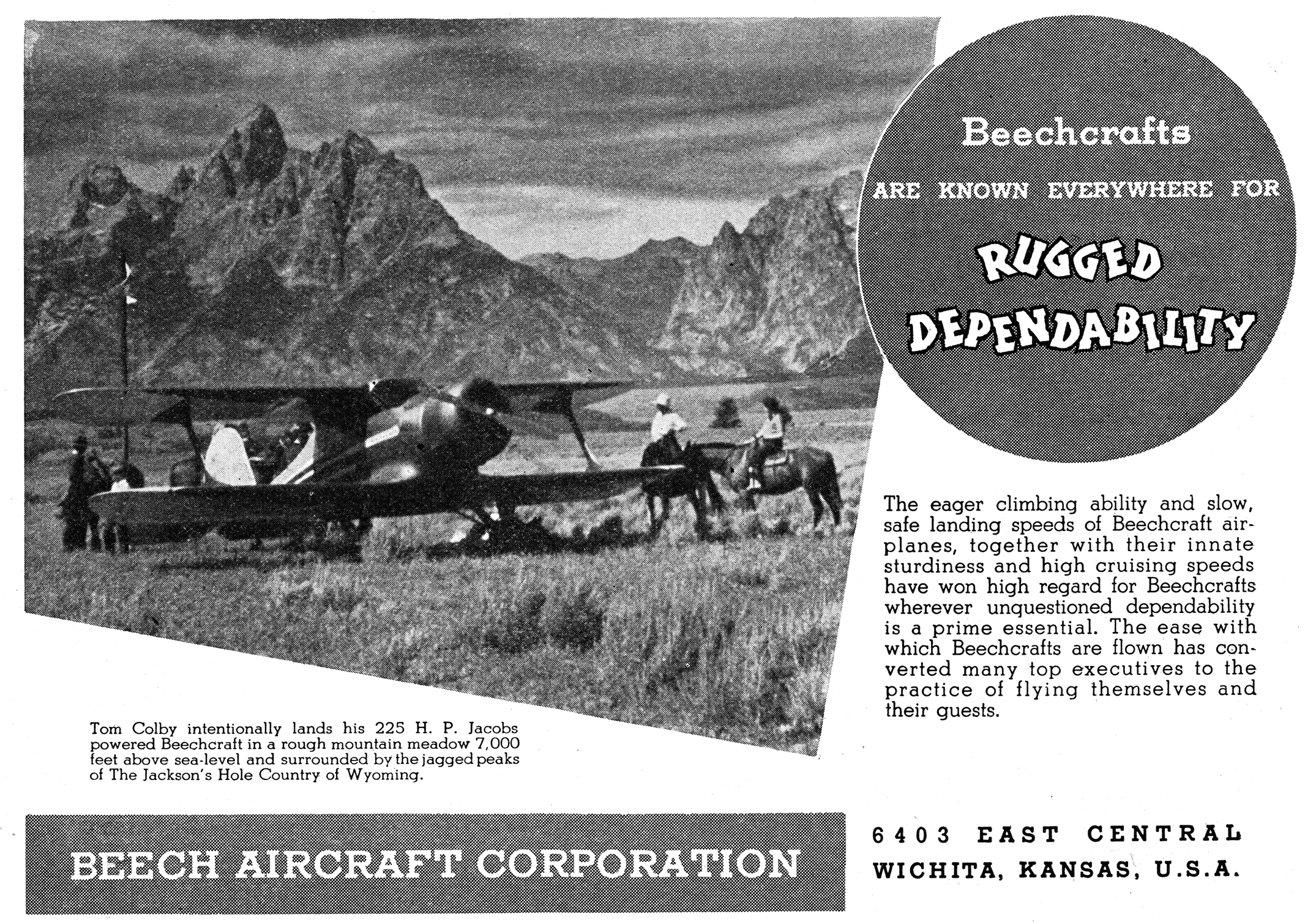
1937 advertisement for the Model 17 Beech Staggerwing

The Staggerwing's speed made it popular with 1930s air racers. An early version of the Model 17 won the 1933 Texaco Trophy Race. In 1935, a British diplomat, Harold Farquhar, successfully flew around the world in a Model B17R, traveling 21,332 miles (34,331 kilometers) from New York to London, by way of Siberia, Southeast Asia, the Middle East, North Africa and back across Europe.

Louise Thaden and Blanche Noyes won the 1936 Bendix trophy in a Model C17R Staggerwing. Thaden also won the Harmon Trophy for her achievement. Jackie Cochran set a women's speed record of 203.9 mph (328 km/h), established an altitude record of over 30,000 feet (9,144 m), and finished third in the 1937 Bendix Trophy Race, all in a special Model D17W Staggerwing. The aircraft made an impressive showing in the 1938 Bendix race, as well.

In 1970, due to a dispute with the T-6 racing class, the Reno National Air Races invited five Staggerwings to perform a demonstration race. Two G models and two D17 models raced. The five pilots were Bryant Morris, Bert Jensen, Don Clark, Noel Gourselle, and Phil Livingston, the only pilot to have prior racing experience in the T-6 class. The race was flawless, with ABC Wide World of Sports coverage, but protesting T-6 racers prevented the class from future competition with allegations of safety issues.

=== World War II ===
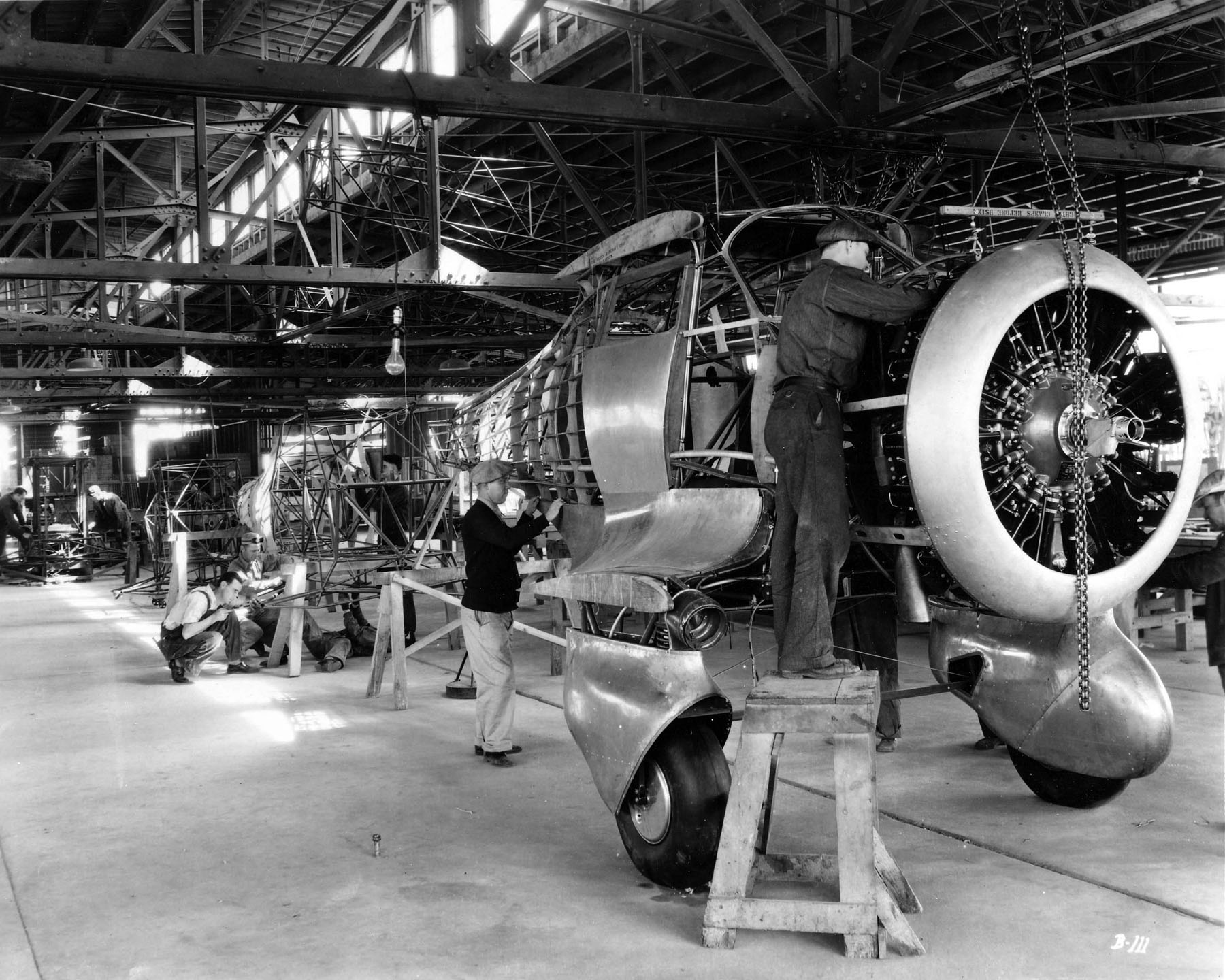
Assembly line at the beginning of Staggerwing production; the sole A17F (with fixed landing gear) is being constructed in front of the frames of the first and second production B17Ls.

As World War II loomed, a number of Model B17Ls were pressed into service as bombers by the Spanish Republican Air Force, the air forces of the Second Spanish Republic during the Spanish Civil War. The Chinese Nationalist Air Force ordered a number of Staggerwings to use as air ambulances during the Second Sino-Japanese War against the invading forces of Imperial Japan. Finland operated one C17L as a liaison aircraft between 1940 and 1945. On October 2, 1941, Beech shipped a special camouflaged D17S to Prince Bernhard of Lippe, who was in exile in London after the German invasion of the Netherlands. He used it for refugee work in and around London.

The Beech UC-43 Traveler was a slightly modified version of the Staggerwing. In late 1938, the United States Army Air Corps purchased three Model D17Ss to evaluate them for use as light liaison aircraft. These were designated YC-43 (Y designating a development aircraft or non-standard type, C standing for Cargo). After a short flight test program, the YC-43s went to Europe to serve as liaison aircraft with the air attachés in London, Paris, and Rome.

Early in World War II, the need for a compact executive-type transport or courier aircraft became apparent, and in 1942, the United States Army Air Forces ordered the first of 270 Model 17s for service within the United States and overseas as the UC-43 (USAAF designation for Utility, Cargo). These differed only in minor details from the commercial model. To meet urgent wartime needs, the government also purchased or leased (impressed) additional "Staggerwings" from private owners, including 118 more for the Army Air Force plus others for the United States Navy. In Navy service, the airplanes were designated as GB-1 and GB-2 (under USN designating convention signifying General (purpose), Beech, 1st or 2nd variant of type). The British Royal Air Force and Royal Navy acquired 106 "Traveller Mk. I" (the British name uses the UK double "l" spelling) through the Lend-Lease arrangement to fill its own critical need for light personnel transports.

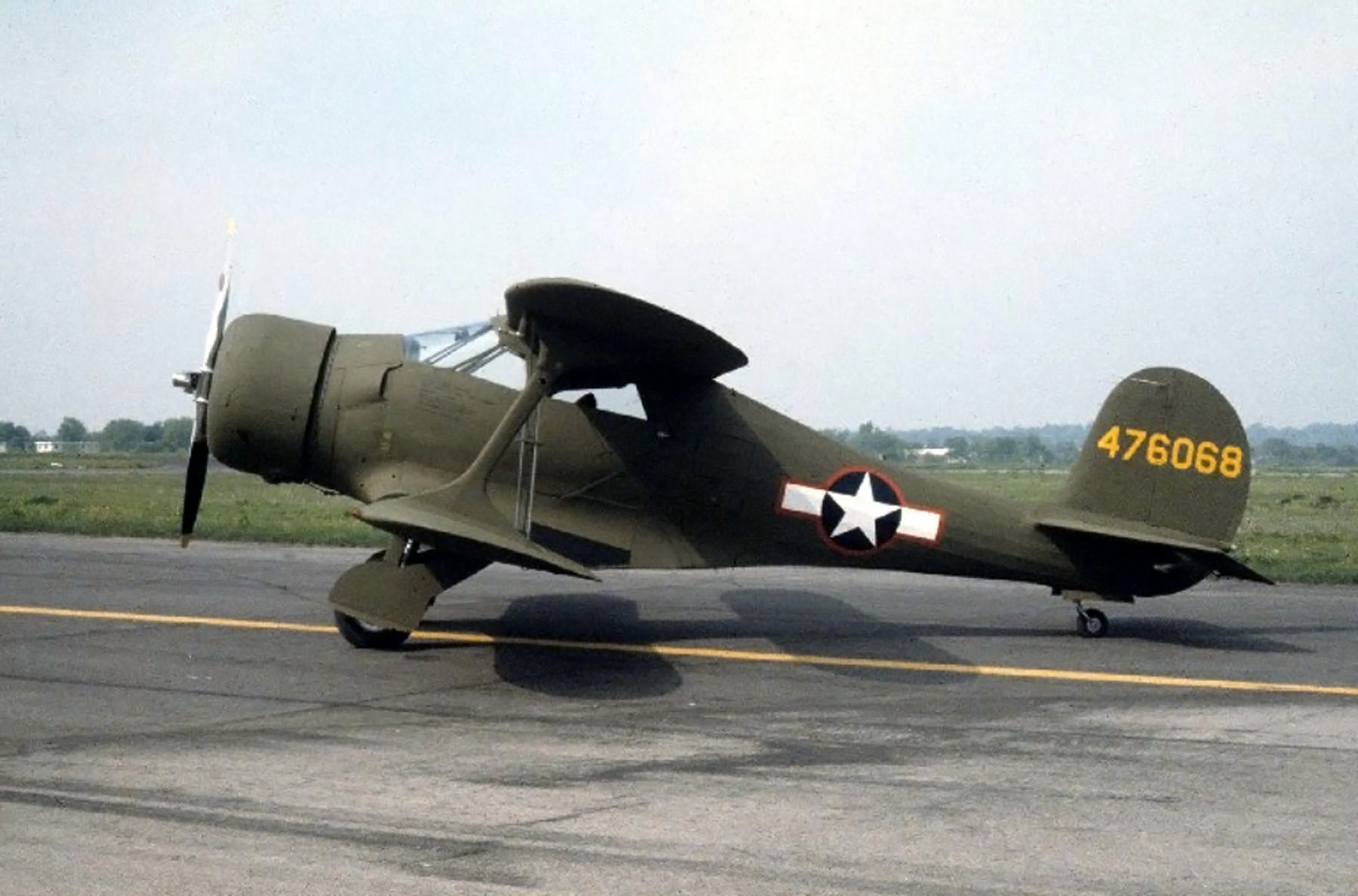
Beech UC-43

The production UC-43 differed in minor details from the service test YC-43. Two distinguishing external features of the UC-43 are the circular automatic direction finder antennae mounted between the main landing gear and landing lights near the lower wingtips. They were all powered by the 450 horsepower (336 kilowatt) Pratt & Whitney R-985 engine.

=== Postwar ===
After the war's end, Beech immediately converted its manufacturing capabilities back to civil aircraft production, making one final version of the Staggerwing, the Model G17S. They built 16 aircraft, which they sold for US$29,000 apiece. Norway sold one D17S to Finland in 1949, which the Finnish Air Force used from 1950 to 1958.

The lightweight V-tail Beechcraft Bonanza, a powerful four-passenger luxury aircraft, soon replaced the venerable Staggerwing in the Beech product line, at about a third of the price. The Bonanza was a smaller aircraft with less horsepower, but carried four people at a similar speed to the Staggerwing. Beechcraft sold the 785th and final Staggerwing in 1948 and delivered it in 1949.

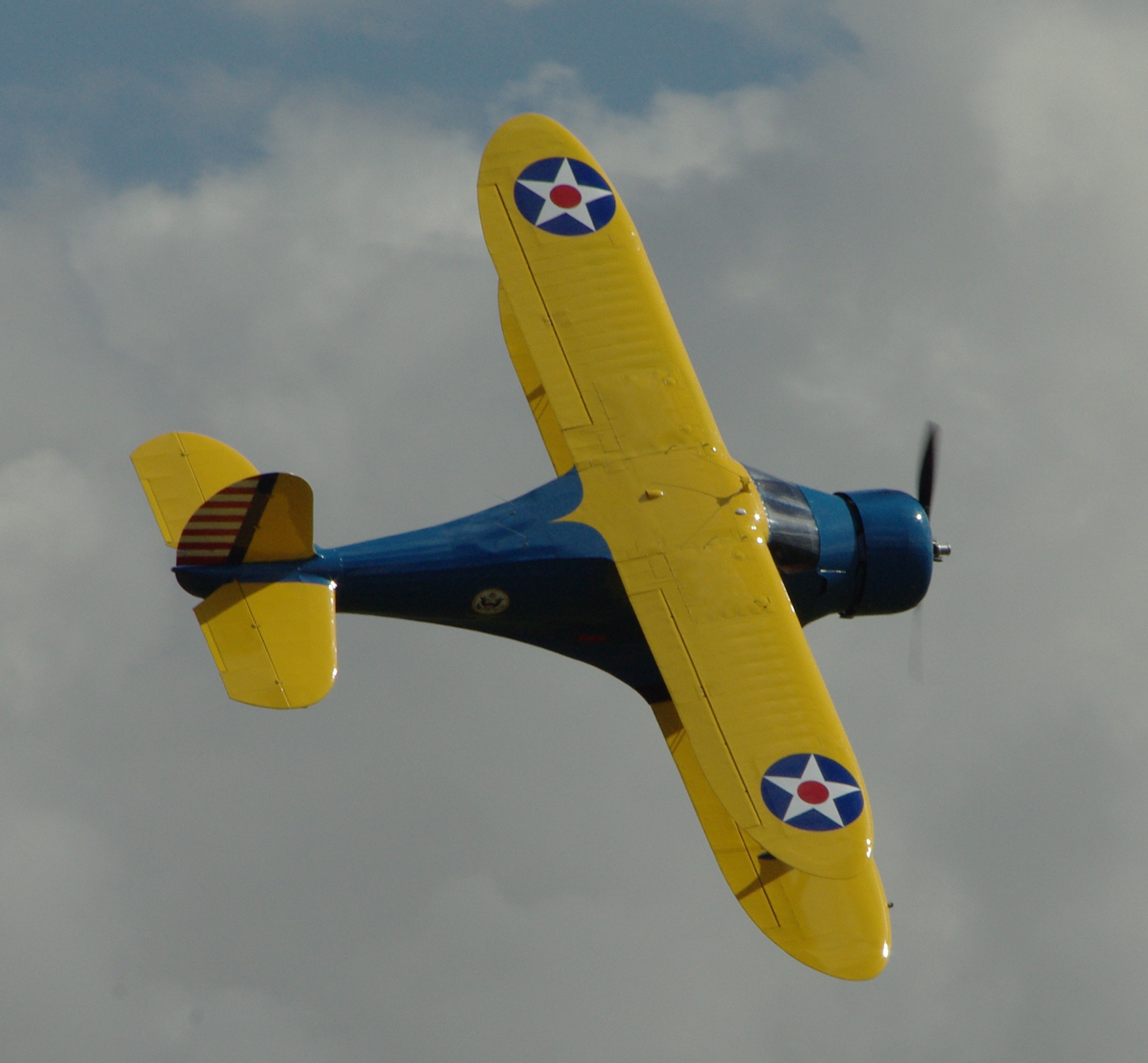
YC-43 Traveler at Flying Legends, Duxford, U.K in 2009

=== Critical praise ===
In March 2003, Plane & Pilot magazine named the Staggerwing one of its Top Ten All-Time Favorite aircraft.

In the April 2007 issue of AOPA Pilot magazine, it was reported that the Staggerwing was voted by nearly 3000 AOPA members as the Most Beautiful Airplane. "Members said it's the perfect balance between 'muscular strength and delicate grace,' and rated it highly for its 'classic lines and symmetry.'"

The November 2012 issue of Aviation History magazine ranked the Staggerwing fifth in their top 12 list of the Worlds Most Beautiful Airplanes. Stating that "Some might think 'the Stag' ungainly, backward wings and all, yet it has become the prime example of vintage beauty" and "...the aftward upper wing led to the big, steeply raked windscreen that is also a key element of what some have called an art deco classic."

== Variants ==
17
Fixed gear prototypes, manufactured from 1932 to 1933.

17R
Prototypes, powered by 420 hp (310 kW) Wright R-975-E2 engine. Made first flight on November 4, 1932. Two built.
17J
Proposed single-seat military development of the Model 17 powered by a 715 hp (533 kW) Wright Cyclone engine. The cockpit was moved aft of the upper wing, which was to be in an inverted gull configuration to improve visibility. Not built.

A17
Fixed gear, plans for production abandoned in 1935.

A17F
Powered by 690 hp (510 kW) Wright R-1820-F11 engine. One built.
A17FS
Powered by 710 hp (530 kW) Wright SR-1820-F3 engine. One built.

B17
Initial production series with retractable landing gear and Clark CYH airfoil. Manufactured 1934 to 1936.

B17B
285 hp (213 kW) Jacobs L-5 engine. One built 1934.
B17E
285 hp (213 kW) Wright R-760-E1 engine. Four built from 1935.
B17L
225 hp (168 kW) Jacobs L-4 engine. 48 built.
SB17L
B17L fitted with floats. One built.
B17R
425 hp (317 kW) Wright R-975-E2/E3 engine. 16 built from 1935.

C17
Manufactured from 1936 to 1937.

C17B
285 hp (213 kW) Jacobs L-5 engine. 40 built.
SC17B
Floatplane version of C17B - One built.
C17E
285 hp (213 kW) Wright R-760-E1.
Tachikawa-Beechcraft C17E Light Transport
20 built in licence production in Japan by Tachikawa, plus two assembled from imported parts for Dai Nihon Koku KK. Manshu, Chuka Koku and agencies such as provincial police headquarters.
C17L
225 hp (168 kW) Jacobs L-4 engine. Six built.
C17R
420 hp (310 kW) Wright R-975-E2/E3 engine. 16 built.
SC17R
Floatplane C17R. One built.

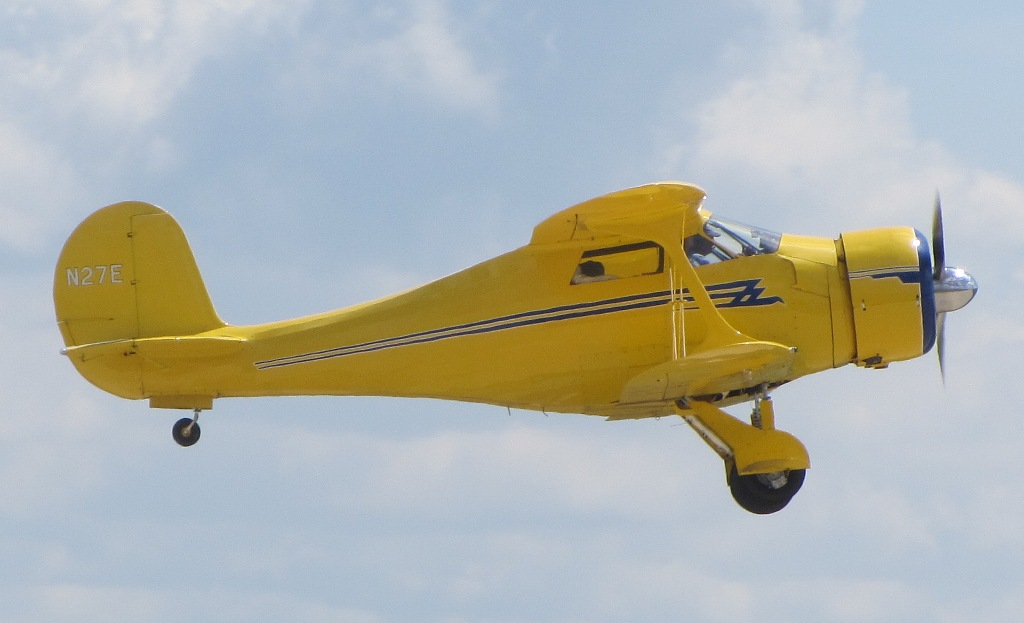
1944 Beechcraft D17S

D17
Manufactured from March 1937 to 1945 (All were military models after 1941).

D17A
350 hp (260 kW) Wright R-760-E2. 10 built.
D17R
420 hp (310 kW) Wright R-975-E3 engine. 27 built.
D17S
450 hp (340 kW) Pratt & Whitney R-985-SB Wasp Junior. 23 built.
SD17S
Floatplane version of D17S.
D17W
600 hp (450 kW) geared and supercharged Pratt & Whitney R-985-SC-G Wasp Junior. Two built.

E17
Manufactured from March 1937 to 1941.

E17B
Powered by 285 hp (213 kW) Jacobs L-MB engine. 50 built.
SE17B
Amphibian version of E17B. Four built.
E17L
Powered by 225 hp (168 kW) Jacobs L-4 engine. One built.

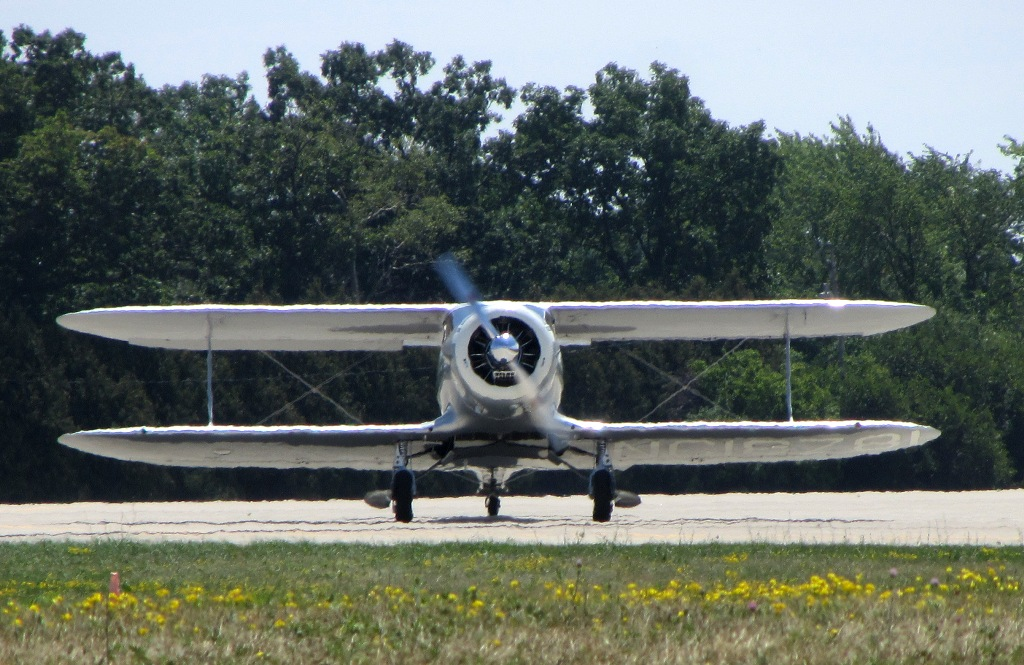
An F17D Model Staggerwing

F17
Manufactured from April 1938 to 1941.

F17D
Powered by 330 hp (250 kW) Jacobs L-6 engine. 61 built.
SF17D
One built.

G17
Manufactured from 1946 to 1948.

G17S
Powered by 450 hp (340 kW) Pratt & Whitney R-985-AN4 engine. 20 built.

20M
Unbuilt twin-engine derivative of the Model 17. Was to have been powered by two Menasco C6S-4 Super Buccaneer engines. Canceled in favor of the Model 18.

=== Military designations ===
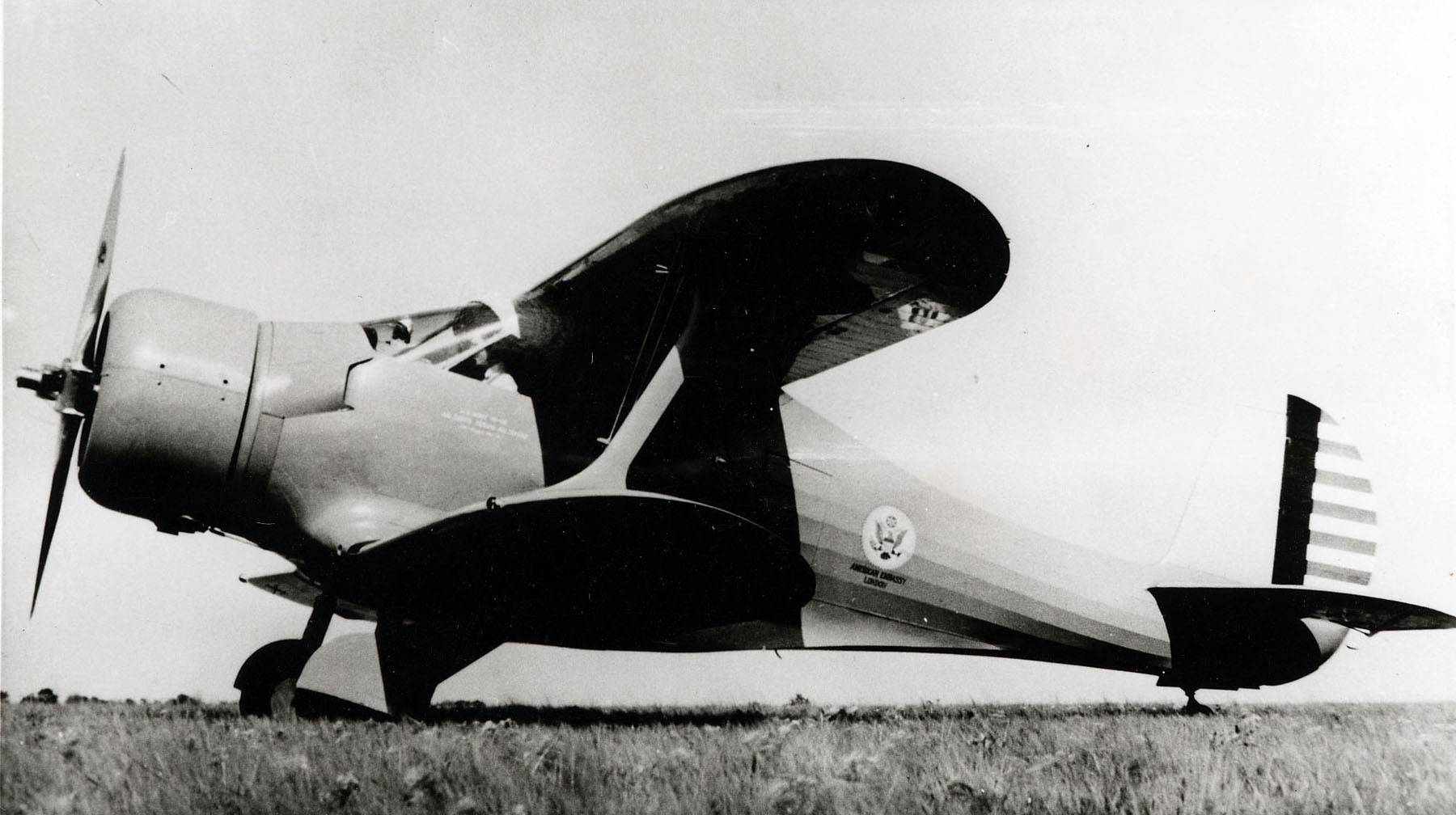
YC-43 (S/N 39-139) assigned to the American Embassy in London, England

YC-43
Three Model D17S with a 450hp R-985-17 engine for evaluation by the United States Army Air Corps. Used by US Air Attachés.

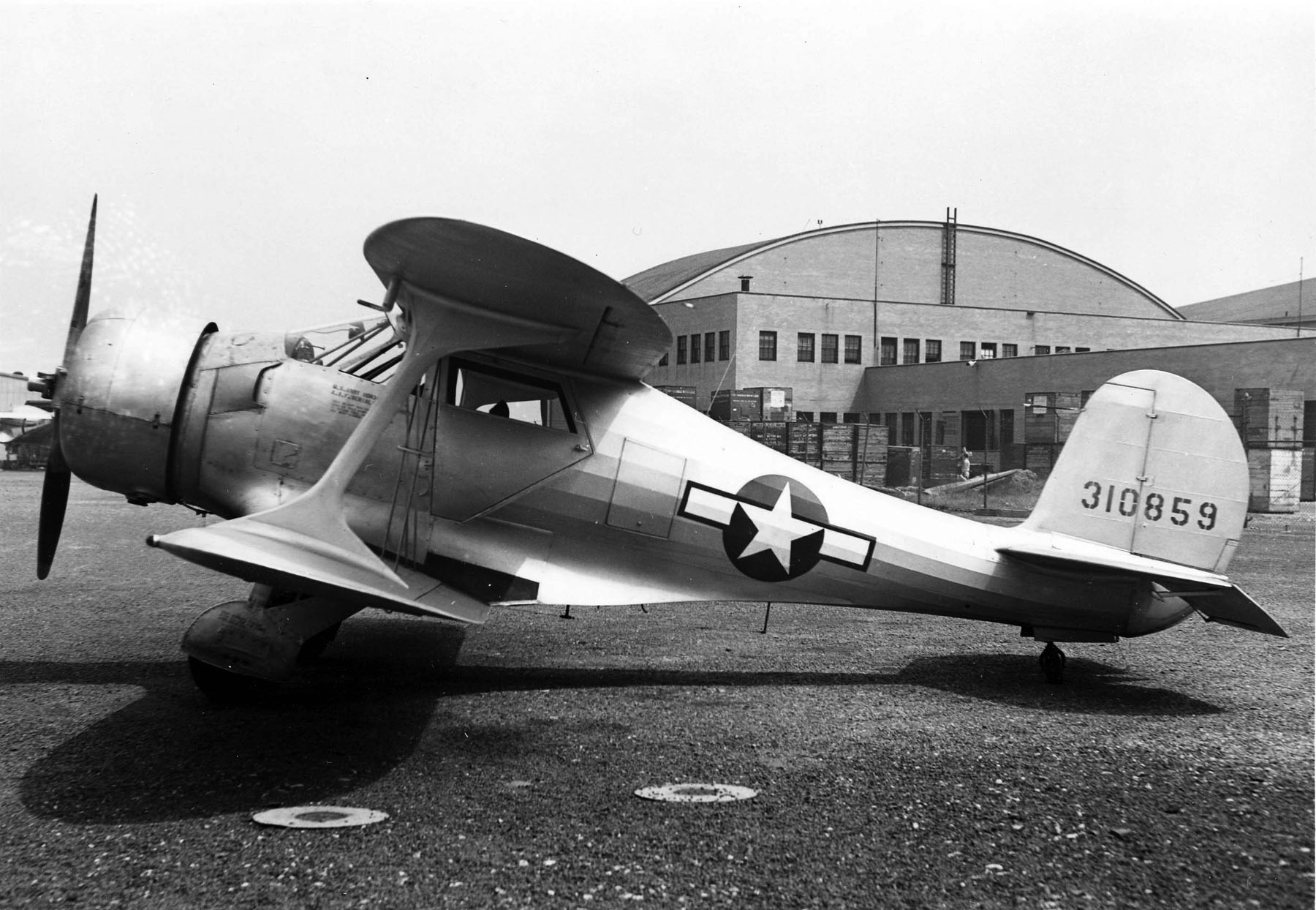
UC-43 s/n 43-10859

UC-43 Traveler
Production version with a 450hp R-985-AN-1 engine, 75 ordered for the Army Air Corps and 63 for the United States Navy as the GB-1, 132 were later transferred from the Navy to the Army Air Corps.
UC-43A
Army Air Force designation for Model D17R. 13 impressed into service.
UC-43B
Army Air Force designation for Model D17S. 13 impressed into service.
UC-43C
Army Air Force designation for Model F17D. 38 impressed into service.
UC-43D
Army Air Force designation for Model E17B. 23 impressed into service.
UC-43E
Army Air Force designation for Model C17R. Five impressed into service.
UC-43F
Army Air Force designation for Model D17A. One impressed into service.
UC-43G
Army Air Force designation for Model C17B. 10 impressed into service.
UC-43H
Army Air Force designation for Model B17R. Three impressed into service.
UC-43J
Army Air Force designation for Model C17L. Three impressed into service.
UC-43K
Army Air Force designation for Model D17W. One impressed into service. This aircraft was originally built in 1937 for famed aviator Jacqueline Cochran. Cochran flew the airplane in the 1937 Bendix cross-country race and placed first in the Women's Division and 3rd overall. She also set a Women's National Speed Record of 203.895 miles per hour using the airplane.

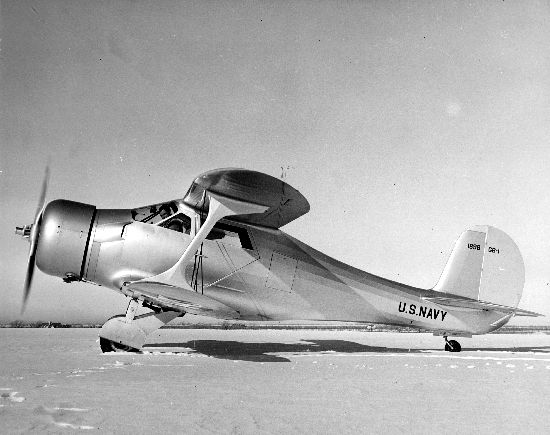
A GB-1 Traveler

GB-1
United States Navy transport version of the D17, ten bought in 1939 and ten impressed into USN service.
GB-2
USN version as GB-1 but with a 450hp R-985-50 or R-985-AN-1 engine, 271 built, 132 later transferred to USAAF as UC-43s. Also additional aircraft from a cancelled British contract and impressed aircraft.
JB-1
One Model C17R as an executive transport for the United States Navy.
Traveller I
British designation for the former US Embassy in London's YC-43 and 107 UC-43 and GB-2 aircraft delivered mainly for the Royal Navy.
D1Be
Brazilian Navy designation for the Model D17A.

=== Engine selection ===
Beechcraft Model 17 Engine Selections
Suffix	Engine (radial configuration)	Cylinders	Power (hp)
A	Wright R-760-E2	7	350
B	Jacobs L-5 (R-830-1)	7	285
D	Jacobs L-6 (R-915A3)	7	330
E	Wright R-760-E1	7	285
F	Wright R-1820-F11	9	690
FS	Wright SR-1820-F3 (supercharged)	9	710
L	Jacobs L-4 (R-755D)	7	225
R	Wright R-975-E2 or E3	9	420–450
S	P&W R-985-AN-1 or AN-3	9	450
W	P&W R-985-SC-G (supercharged & geared)	9	600

== Operators ==
=== Military ===
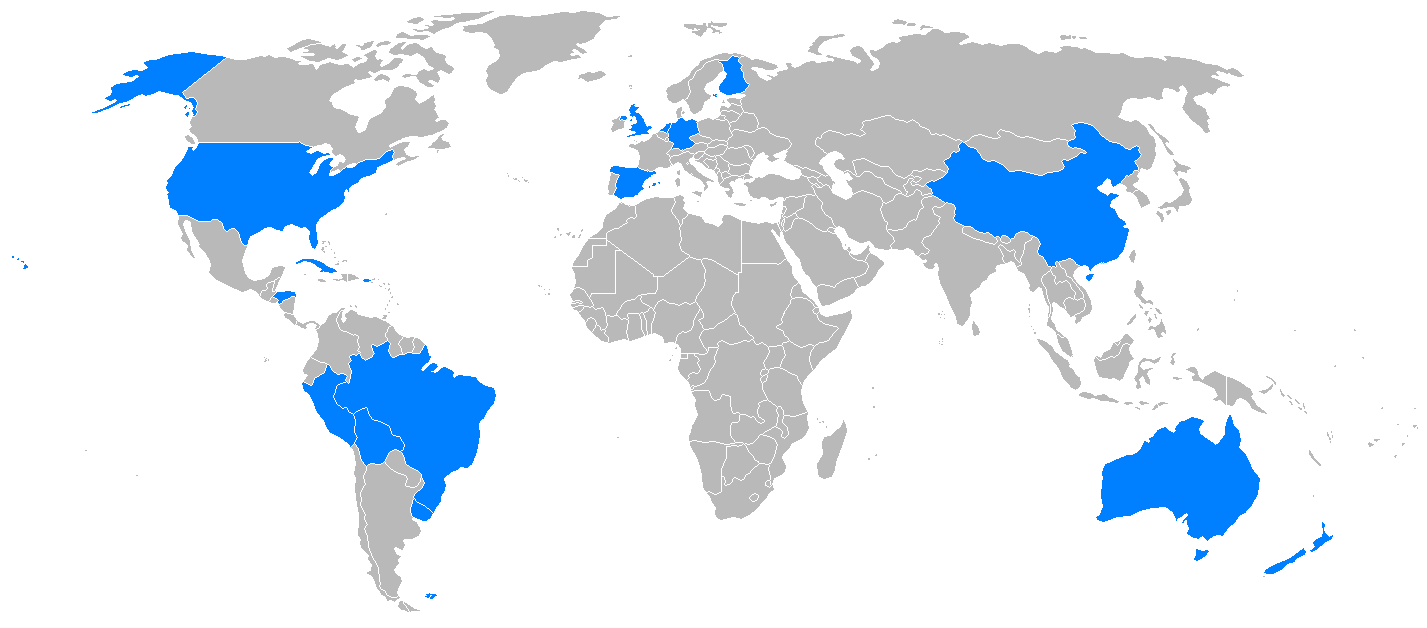
Military staggerwing operators

Numbers operated from

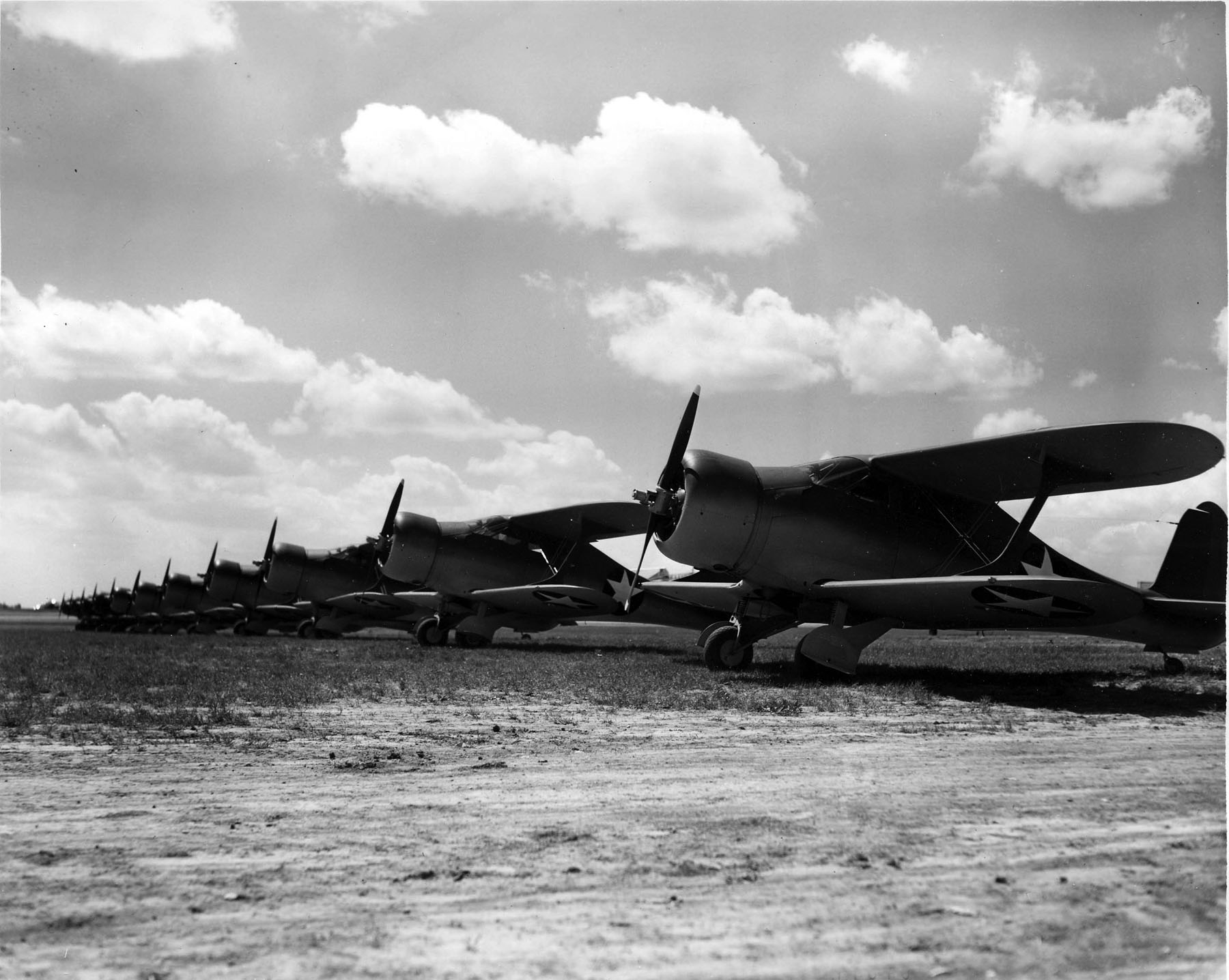
Lineup of GB-2 Travelers in early 1943

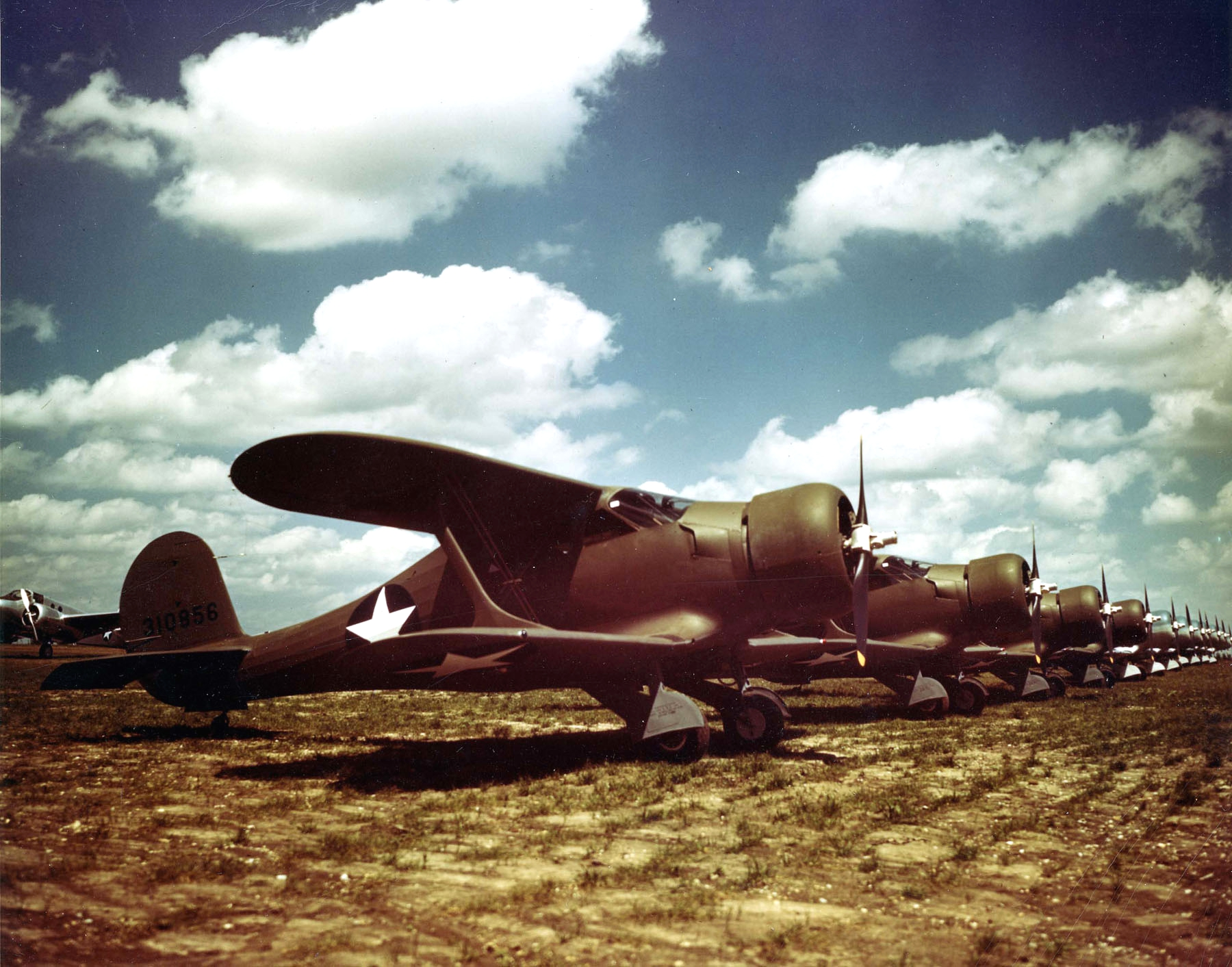
UC-43 Travelers in foreground, and GB-2 Travelers farther down the line with their two-tone paint job

Australia

- Royal Australian Air Force (operated three from 1941 to 1947)

Bolivia

- Bolivian Air Force (received one in 1941)

Brazil

- NAB – Navegação Aérea Brasileira (airline)
- Brazilian Air Force (operated 54 from 1942 to 1960)
- Brazilian Naval Aviation (operated four from 1940 to 1941)

China

- Chinese Nationalist Air Force (operated 21 from 1937 to 1945)

Republic of China-Nanjing

- Nanjing air force (operated one from 1941 to 1945)

Cuba

- Cuban Army Aviation Corps (operated two in 1945 and 1958)

Ethiopia

- Ethiopian Government (operated two from 1935 to 1936)

Finland

- Finnish Air Force (operated one C17L from 1940 to 1945 and one D17S from 1950 to 1958)

Honduras

- Honduran Air Force (operated two from 1936 to 1958)

Netherlands

- Netherlands Naval Aviation Service (one from 1942 to 1945)

New Zealand

- Royal New Zealand Air Force
  - No. 42 Squadron RNZAF

Peru

- Peruvian Air Force five from 1946 to 1958

Spain

- Spanish Republican Air Force (operated nine in 1936)

United Kingdom

- Royal Air Force
- Royal Navy - Fleet Air Arm
  - 701 Naval Air Squadron
  - 712 Naval Air Squadron
  - 730 Naval Air Squadron
  - 740 Naval Air Squadron
  - 776 Naval Air Squadron
  - 778 Naval Air Squadron
  - 781 Naval Air Squadron
  - 782 Naval Air Squadron
  - 787 Naval Air Squadron
  - 799 Naval Air Squadron

USA

- US Army Air Corps
- US Army Air Force
- United States Navy
- Civil Air Patrol

Uruguay

- Uruguayan Air Force (operated one from 1944 to 1962)

== Aircraft on display ==
Brazil

- 6691 – D17S on static display at the Museu Aeroespacial in Rio de Janeiro, Brazil.

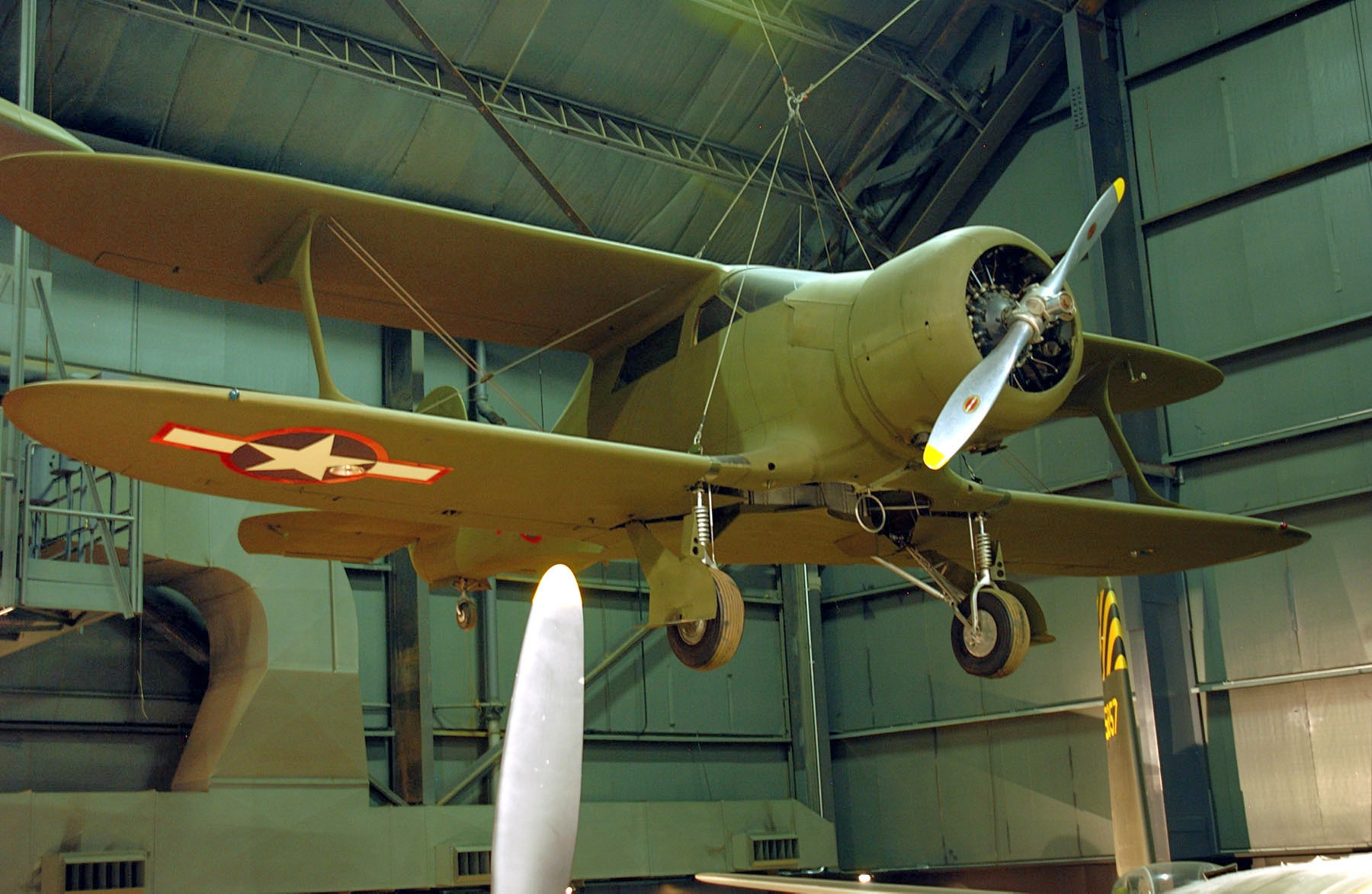
Beech UC-43 Traveler at the National Museum of the Air Force

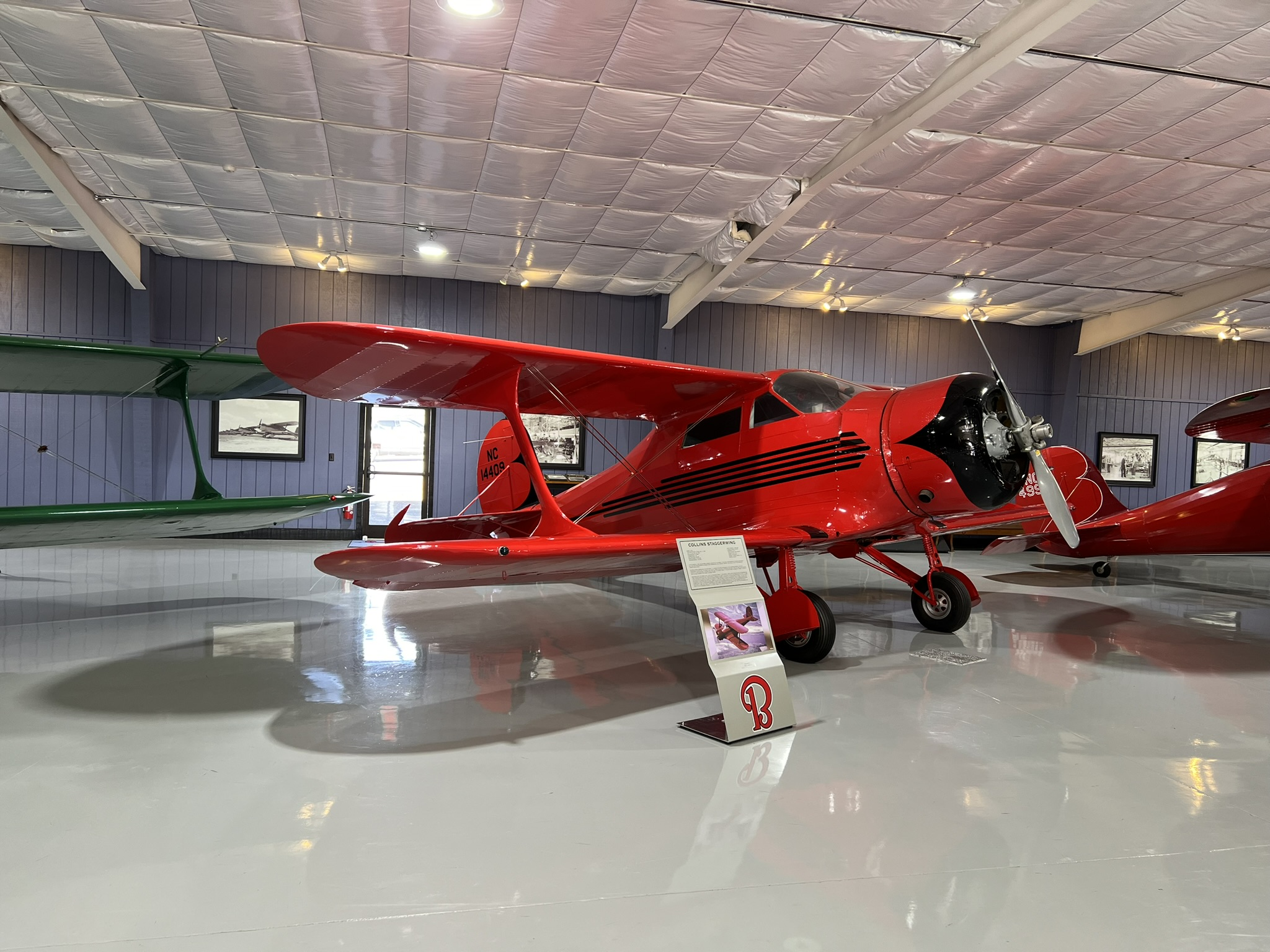
Beechcraft B17L at the Beechcraft Heritage Museum

United States

- 1 – 17R on display at the Beechcraft Heritage Museum in Tullahoma, Tennessee. This airframe is the prototype Model 17.
- 21 – B17L on display at the Beechcraft Heritage Museum in Tullahoma, Tennessee.
- 93 – C17L on static display at the National Air and Space Museum in Washington, D.C. It was built as a C17B and originally owned by Buzz Aldrin's father.
- 100 – C17B on display at the Beechcraft Heritage Museum in Tullahoma, Tennessee.
- 231 – E17B on display at the Beechcraft Heritage Museum in Tullahoma, Tennessee.
- 257 – F17D on display at the Mid-America Air Museum in Liberal, Kansas.
- 305 – D17A on static display at the Evergreen Aviation & Space Museum in McMinnville, Oregon. This airframe was impressed into service during World War II as UC-43F 42-49071.
- 333 – F17D on display at the Beechcraft Heritage Museum in Tullahoma, Tennessee.
- 395 – D17S on display at the Beechcraft Heritage Museum in Tullahoma, Tennessee.
- 2012 - D17S on display inside at the Clarksville Regional Airport and Jet Center at Clarksville, Tennessee.
- 4835 – D17S on display at the Beechcraft Heritage Museum in Tullahoma, Tennessee.
- 4890 – UC-43 on display at the Yanks Air Museum in Chino, California. It has the USAAF serial number 43-10842. It was the museum's first aircraft and bears the seal of the U.S. Ambassador to the United Kingdom.
- 6700 – GB-2 on static display at the National Naval Aviation Museum at Naval Air Station Pensacola near Pensacola, Florida. It has the US Navy Bureau Number 23688.
- 6880 – UC-43 on display at the Fantasy of Flight in Polk City, Florida.
- 6897 – D17S on display at the Lone Star Flight Museum in Houston, Texas. Registration N666TX.
- 6913 – GB-2 on static display at the National Museum of the United States Air Force at Wright-Patterson Air Force Base near Dayton, Ohio. It is painted as UC-43 39-139.
- B-3 – G17S on display at the Beechcraft Heritage Museum in Tullahoma, Tennessee.
- B-7 – G17S on display at the Beechcraft Heritage Museum in Tullahoma, Tennessee.

== Surviving aircraft ==
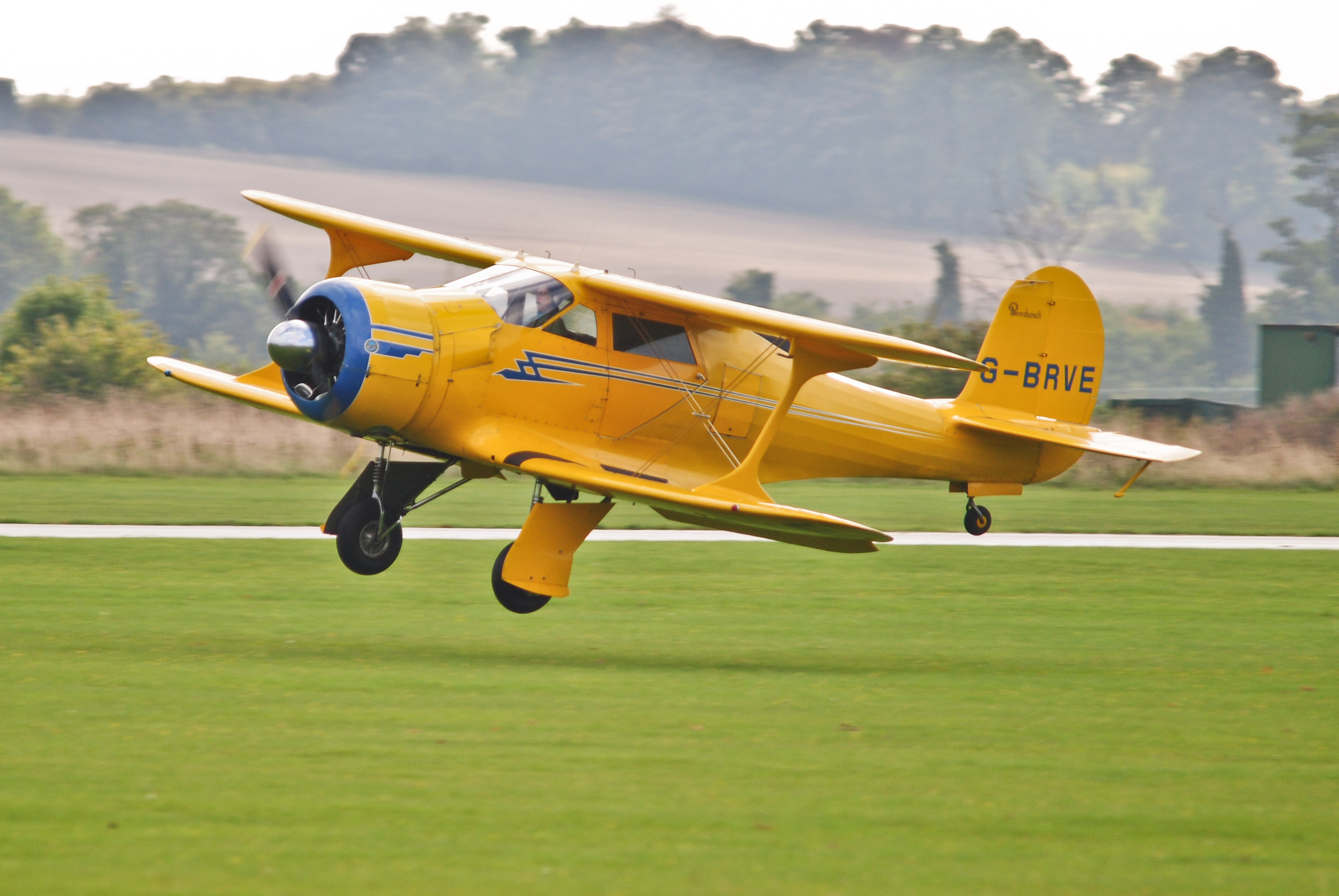
The Fighter Collection's Staggerwing, G-BRVE, in 2013

Many Staggerwings remain registered with the FAA in flyable condition, or undergoing restoration. Several military versions are on display.

Australia

- 67755 – D17S airworthy with Allan Arthur.

Canada

- 403 – D17S in storage at the Reynolds-Alberta Museum in Wetaskiwin, Alberta.
- 4874 – D17S airworthy owned by 1138110 Alberta Ltd. of Edmonton, Alberta. It was previously owned by Vintage Wings of Canada in Gatineau, Quebec.

United Kingdom

- 4803 – D17S airworthy at Old Buckenham Airport in Norwich, Norfolk.
- 6701 – D17S airworthy at The Fighter Collection in Duxford, Cambridgeshire. It was built in 1943 as a US Navy model GB-2. It was shipped to the UK and flown by Royal Navy's 782 Naval Air Squadron as Traveller Mk.I FT475. Postwar, it was returned to the US and flown by the US Air Force before passing into private hands. It came back to the UK in 1990 and has since flown with several owners under the UK registration G-BRVE.

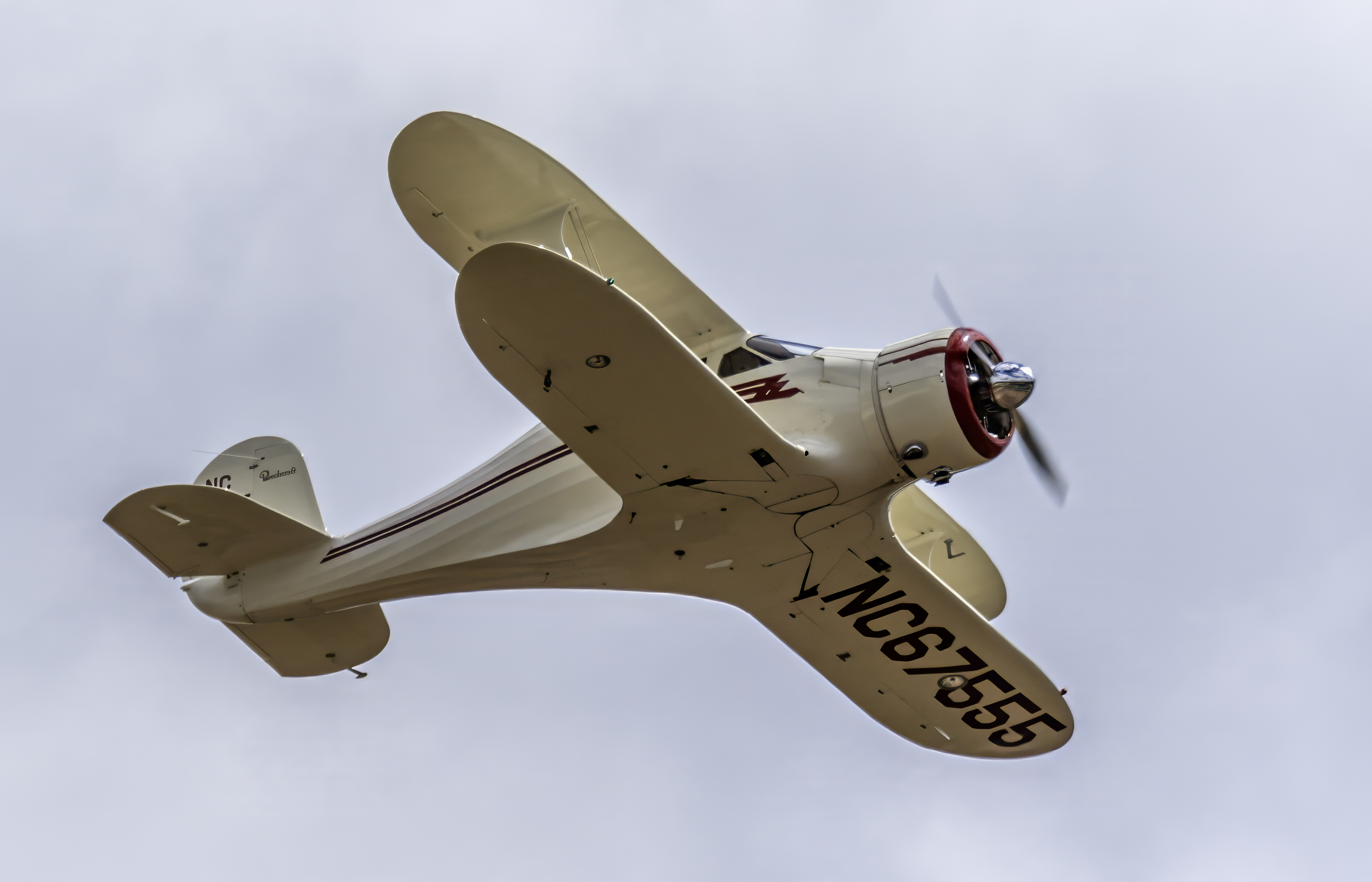
Beechcraft Staggerwing D17S

United States

- 102/110 – C17B airworthy with Christine M. St. Onge of Wexford, Pennsylvania. It is operated out of Grove City Airport in Grove City, Pennsylvania. The aircraft is painted in the colors and scheme used by Blanche Noyes and Louise Thaden for the 1936 Bendix Air Race.
- 198 – UC-43D airworthy at the Frontiers of Flight Museum in Dallas, Texas.
- 3098 – D17S airworthy at the Legacy Flight Museum in Rexburg, Idaho.
- 6704 – UC-43 airworthy at the National Warplane Museum in Geneseo, New York.
- 6914 – D17S airworthy at the Historic Flight Foundation in Spokane, Washington.

== Specifications (Beech Model D17S) ==
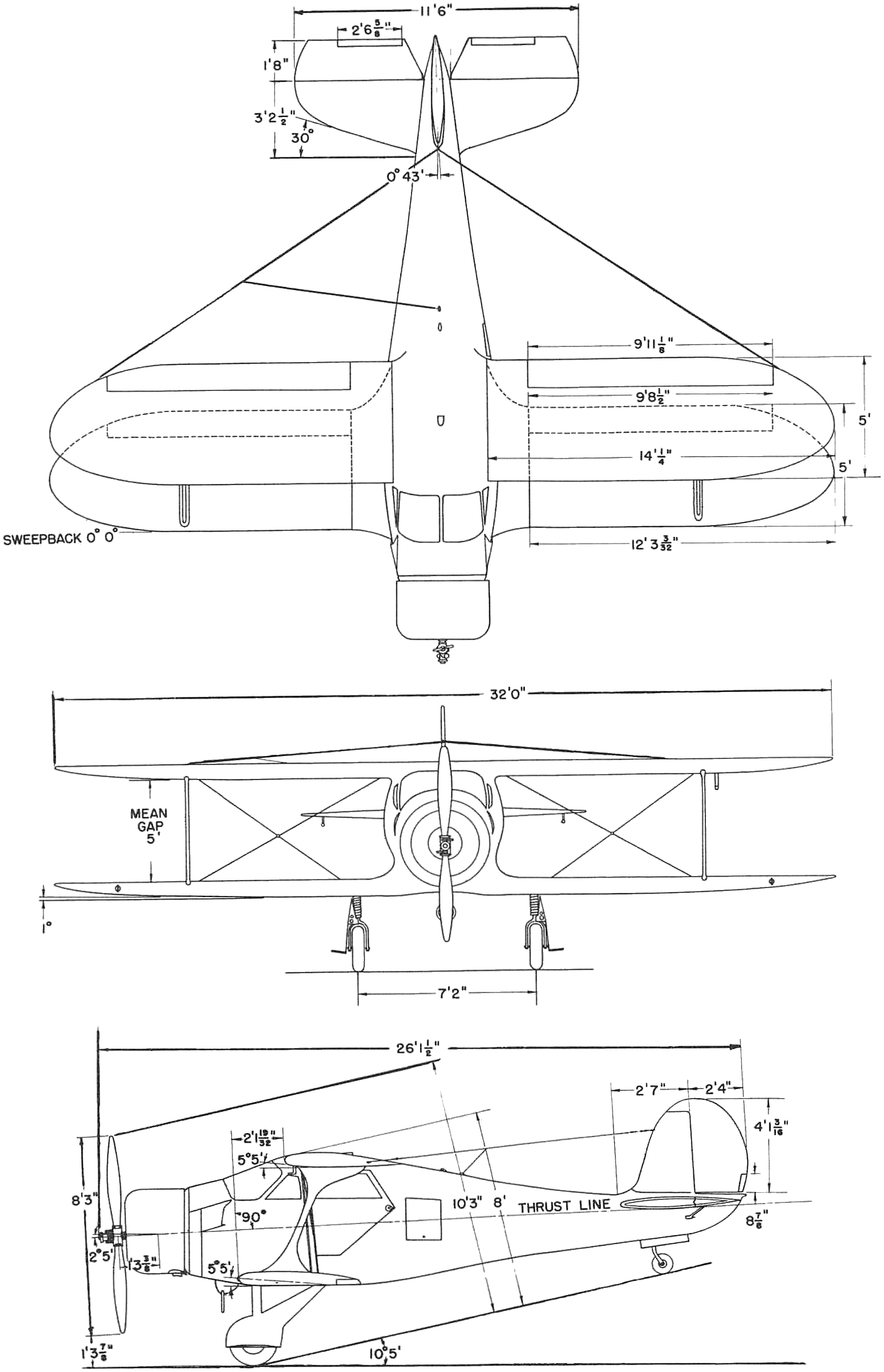
3-view line drawing of the Beechcraft UC-43

Data from Jane's Fighting Aircraft of World War II

General characteristics

- Crew: one
- Capacity: three or four passengers plus 125 lb (56.7 kg) baggage
- Length: 26 ft 10 in (8.18 m)
- Wingspan: 32 ft (9.8 m)
- Height: 8 ft (2.4 m)
- Wing area: 296.5 sq ft (27.55 m^{2})
- Empty weight: 2,540 lb (1,152 kg)
- Gross weight: 4,250 lb (1,928 kg)
- Powerplant: 1 × Pratt & Whitney R-985-AN-1 "Wasp Junior" radial engine, 450 hp (340 kW) at 2,300 rpm

Performance

- Maximum speed: 212 mph (341 km/h, 184 kn)
- Cruise speed: 202 mph (325 km/h, 176 kn)
- Range: 670 mi (1,078 km, 582 nmi)
- Service ceiling: 25,000 ft (7,600 m)
- Rate of climb: 1,500 ft/min (7.6 m/s)
- Wing loading: 14.3 lb/sq ft (70 kg/m^{2})
- Power/mass: 9.44 lb/hp (5.68 kg/kW)

== See also ==
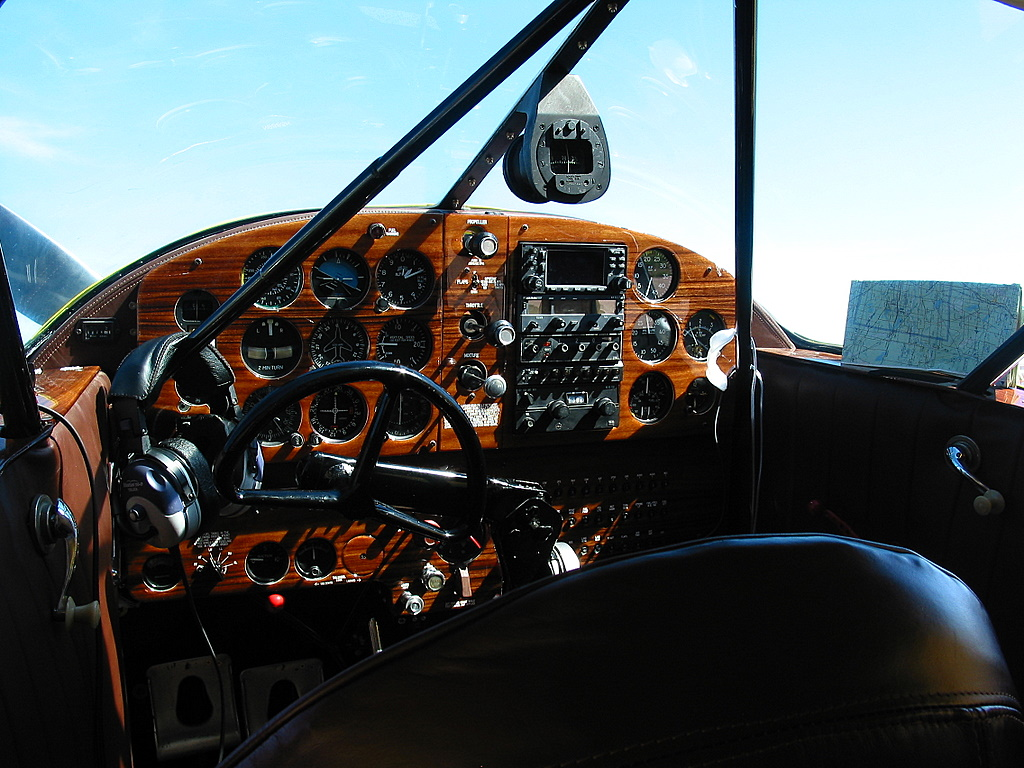
Staggerwing cockpit, for 21st century flying

- Griffon Lionheart

Aircraft of comparable role, configuration, and era

- Howard DGA-15
- Spartan Executive

Related lists

- List of aircraft of the Spanish Republican Air Force
- List of aircraft of World War II
- Military transport aircraft
