= 1853 Naval Air Squadron =

Inactive flying squadron of the Royal Navy's Fleet Air Arm

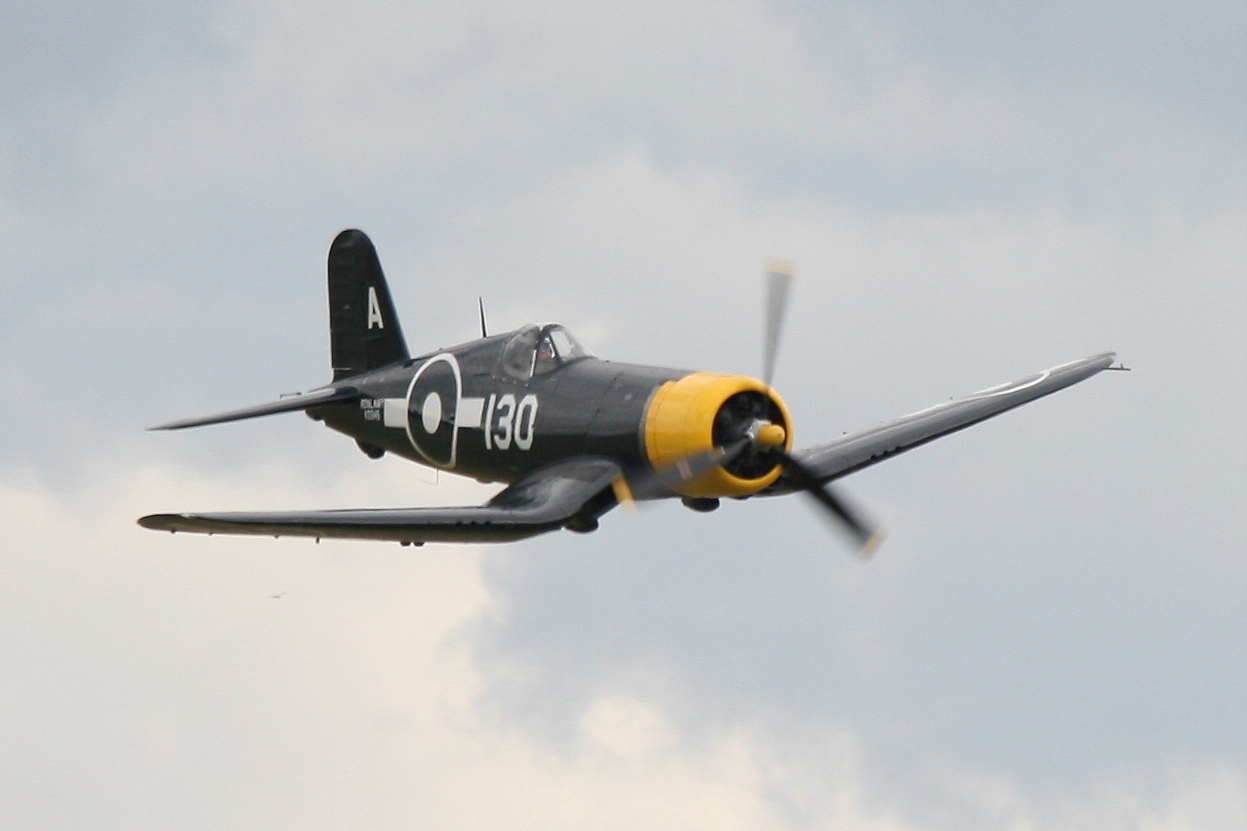
- A Fleet Air Arm Goodyear FG-1D Corsair; an example of the type used by 1853 NAS
- Active: 1945
- Disbanded: 15 August 1945
- Country: United Kingdom
- Branch: Royal Navy
- Type: Single-seat fighter squadron
- Role: Fighter squadron
- Size: Eighteen aircraft
- Part of: Fleet Air Arm
- Home station: See Naval air stations section for full list.

Commanders
- Notable commanders: Leutnant zur See J.R. Schuiling, RNethN

Insignia
- Identification Markings: 1V11+ single letters (May 1945)

Aircraft flown
- Fighter: Vought Corsair

1853 Naval Air Squadron (1853 NAS) was a Fleet Air Arm (FAA) naval air squadron of the United Kingdom’s Royal Navy (RN). It formed at RN Air Section Brunswick, in the United States on 1 April 1945 as a fighter squadron, with eighteen Vought Corsair Mk IV fighter aircraft. Following deck landing training aboard USS Charger, it embarked in HMS Rajah for the United Kingdom on 24 July. It disembarked to HMS Landrail, RNAS Machrihanish, on 6 August, but due to V-J Day it disbanded there on 15 August.

== History ==
=== Single-seat fighter squadron (1945) ===
1853 Naval Air Squadron formed on 1 April 1945 in the United States at RN Air Section Brunswick, which was located at United States Naval Air Station (USNAS) Brunswick, Maine, as a Single Seat Fighter Squadron, under the command of Leutnant zur See J. R. Schuiling, RNethN.

It was equipped with eighteen Vought Corsair aircraft, an American carrier-borne fighter-bomber. These were the Goodyear built FG-1D, called Corsair Mk IV by the Fleet Air Arm. The squadron moved to RN Air Section Norfolk situated USNAS Norfolk, Norfolk, Virginia to enable it to undertake deck landing training with the United States Navy's escort carrier, the USS Charger, before returning to RN Air Section Brunswick. It then returned to RN Air Section Norfolk via RN Air Section Floyd Bennett Field, located at USNAS Floyd Bennett Field, Brooklyn, New York City, arriving on 14 July for embarkation in the Ruler-class escort carrier, HMS Rajah, for transport to the United Kingdom, departing on 24 July.

On 23 July, HMS Rajah arrived in Norfolk, where she took on board the personnel and eighteen Vought Corsair aircraft from 1853 Naval Air Squadron for their journey to the UK. She set sail on July 28th, likely not in convoy due to the conclusion of the war in Europe, and was headed for the Clyde, where she arrived on 5 August.

The squadron disembarked to RNAS Machrihanish (HMS Landrail), Argyll and Bute, Scotland on 6 August. It was planned to form part of the 4th Carrier Air Group for the lead ship of her class of aircraft carrier, HMS Illustrious, the plans were cancelled due to V-J Day and the squadron disbanded at RNAS Machrihanish on 15 August 1945.

== Aircraft flown ==
1853 Naval Air Squadron flew only one aircraft type:

- Vought Corsair Mk IV fighter bomber (April - August 1945)

== Naval air stations ==
1853 Naval Air Squadron operated from a naval air station of the Royal Navy, in the United Kingdom, a number overseas, and a Royal Navy escort carrier:

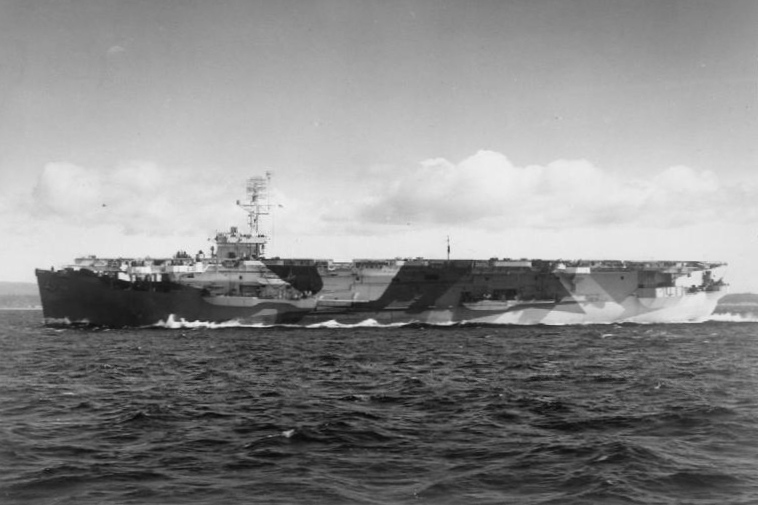
HMS Rajah

- RN Air Section Brunswick, Maine, (1 April – 14 July 1945)
  - RN Air Section Norfolk, Virginia, (Detachment DLT USS Charger 6–15 June 1945)
- RN Air Section Norfolk, Virginia, (14–24 July 1945)
- HMS Rajah (24 July – 6 August 1945)
- Royal Naval Air Station Machrihanish (HMS Landrail), Argyll and Bute, (6–15 August 1945)
- disbanded (15 August 1945)

== Commanding officers ==
List of commanding officers of 1853 Naval Air Squadron with date of appointment:

- Leutnant zur See J.R. Schuiling, RNethN, from 1 April 1945
- disbanded - 16 August 1945
