= 1838 Naval Air Squadron =

Inactive flying squadron of the Royal Navy's Fleet Air Arm

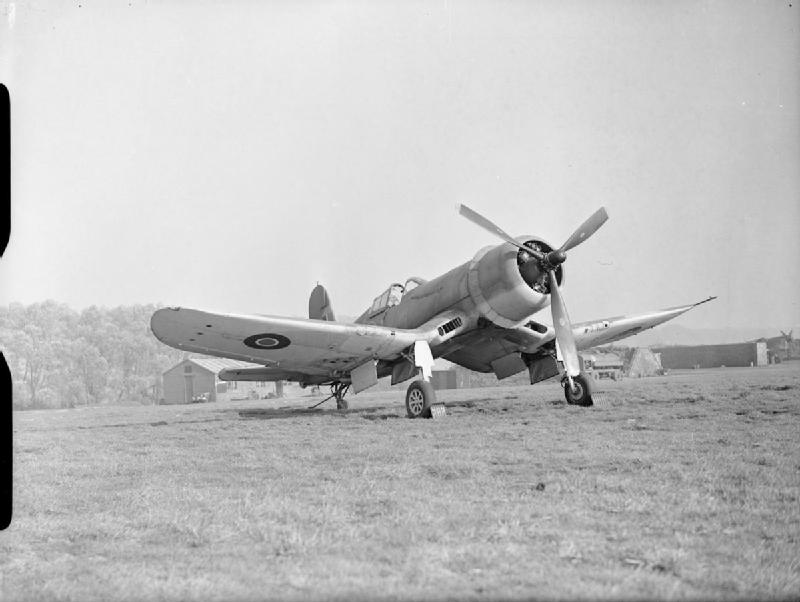
- Vought Corsair; an example of the type used by 1838 NAS
- Active: 1943–1944
- Disbanded: 13 September 1944
- Country: United Kingdom
- Branch: Royal Navy
- Type: Single-seat fighter squadron
- Role: Carrier-based fighter squadron
- Size: Ten aircraft
- Part of: Fleet Air Arm
- Home station: See Naval air stations section for full list.
- Engagements: World War II: Pacific War; Operation Crimson
- Battle honours: Sabang 1944

Insignia
- Identification Markings: Unknown

Aircraft flown
- Fighter: Vought Corsair

1838 Naval Air Squadron (1838 NAS) was a Fleet Air Arm (FAA) naval air squadron of the United Kingdom’s Royal Navy (RN). The squadron was established as a fighter unit in the United States in October 1943, before embarking in the escort carrier HMS Begum in January 1944. In February, the squadron arrived at the airbase HMS Ringtail, RNAS Burscough, passing through the airbase HMS Landrail, RNAS Machrihanish. It embarked in the escort carrier HMS Atheling in February for journey to Ceylon, arriving at the RN Air Section at RAF Minneriya in April. The squadron joined the fleet carrier HMS Victorious in July for a mission to Sabang, returning to the airfield HMS Berhunda, RNAS Colombo Racecourse. It re-embarked in HMS Atheling in August, headed to South Africa, and landed at the airbase HMS Malagas, RNAS Wingfield, where it disbanded into 1830 and 1833 Naval Air Squadrons in September.

== History ==
=== Single-seat fighter squadron (1943–1944) ===
1838 Naval Air Squadron was officially established in the United States at RN Air Section Brunswick, located at the US Naval Air Station Brunswick, Maine, on 1 October 1943. This squadron, which operated single-seat fighter aircraft, was commanded by Lieutenant Commander(A) F. B. P. Sanderson of the Royal Naval Volunteer Reserve. The aircraft it initially operated were ten Vought Corsair carrier-based fighter aircraft, these were the Vought Chance built F4U-1 and known as the Corsair Mk I in the Fleet Air Arm.

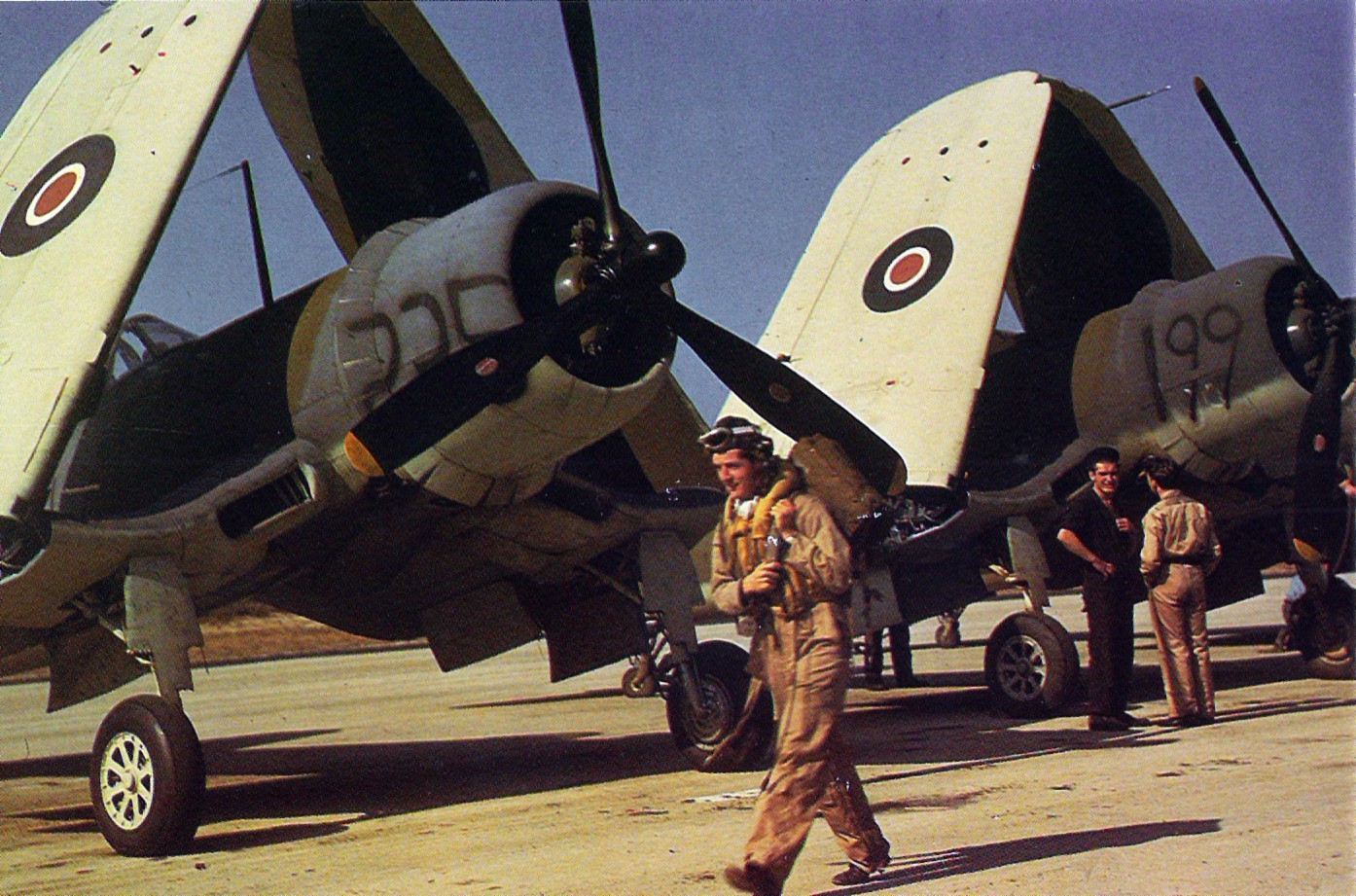
Royal Navy Vought Corsair Mk I fighters at Naval Air Station Brunswick, Maine

Following an initial acclimatisation to the aircraft and associated equipment, the squadron commenced rigorous training to ready itself for active deployment. This training encompassed a variety of activities, including navigation drills, low-altitude manoeuvres, formation flying, and the development of air combat manoeuvring. At the beginning of 1944, the Vought Corsair Mk I aircraft were withdrawn and substituted with Mk II variants, which were the Vought Chance built F4U-1A. Subsequently, the squadron relocated to RN Air Section Norfolk situated at USNAS Norfolk to conduct a day of Deck Landing Training (DLT) with the USS Charger.

The Ruler-class escort carrier, HMS Begum, departed from Naval Station Norfolk on the afternoon of 14 January, carrying 1838 Naval Air Squadron. Upon reaching New York on 16 January, the vessel continued its journey, leaving the port on 18 January to join convoy UT.7 bound for Liverpool, England. The carrier arrived in Liverpool Docks on 29 January, at which point the squadron disembarked and proceeded to naval air station RNAS Burscough (HMS Ringtail) in Lancashire, via the airfield RNAS Machrihanish (HMS Landrail), Argyll and Bute, Scotland.

Following a short period at RNAS Burscough, 1838 Naval Air Squadron was deployed to Ceylon aboard the escort carrier and HMS Begum's sister ship, HMS Atheling, on 26 February 1944. The squadron arrived at the RN Air Section located at RAF Minneriya, Ceylon, on 13 April. It was scheduled to continue flying training in Ceylon, with a brief embarkation on the Maintenance Carrier HMS Unicorn, an aircraft repair ship and light aircraft carrier, on 6 June, during which they would participate in two days of Deck Landing Training (DLT). In late July 1944, 1838 Naval Air Squadron was deployed aboard the Fleet Carrier, HMS Victorious, an Illustrious-class aircraft carrier, as part of Operation Crimson, which aimed to conduct strikes against targets located in Sabang, Sumatra. This operation entailed a combination of naval bombardment and aerial assaults on Japanese airfields situated in the Indonesian cities of Sabang, Lhoknga, and Kutaraja on the island of Sumatra. Carrier-based aircraft played a crucial role in neutralising the airfields and offering air support for the forces engaged in the bombardment.

The carrier returned to Ceylon on the 27, with 1838 Naval Air Squadron disembarking at RNAS Colombo Racecourse (HMS Berhunda). This brief mission constituted the squadron's sole engagement in combat, resulting in the conferment of the Battle Honour ‘Sabang’. On 25 August 1944, the squadron re embarked in HMS Atheling for transit to Cape Town, South Africa. Upon reaching their destination on 12 September, the squadron disembarked at RNAS Wingfield (HMS Malagas), where it was officially disbanded the next day. The aircraft and personnel of the squadron were integrated into 1830 and 1833 Naval Air Squadrons to strengthen the 15th Naval Fighter Wing.

The intention was to reform in November 1945, which would have involved the deployment of fifteen Vought Corsair aircraft for a 5th Carrier Air Group within the British Pacific Fleet; however, this initiative was ultimately abandoned following Victory over Japan Day.

== Aircraft flown ==
1838 Naval Air Squadron flew two variants of only one aircraft type:

- Vought Corsair Mk I fighter aircraft (October 1943 - January 1944)
- Vought Corsair Mk II fighter aircraft (January - September 1944)

== Battle honours ==
The following Battle Honours have been awarded to 1838 Naval Air Squadron:

- Sabang 1945

== Naval air stations ==
1838 Naval Air Squadron operated from a number of naval air stations of the Royal Navy in the UK and overseas, a Royal Navy fleet carrier and a number of escort carriers:

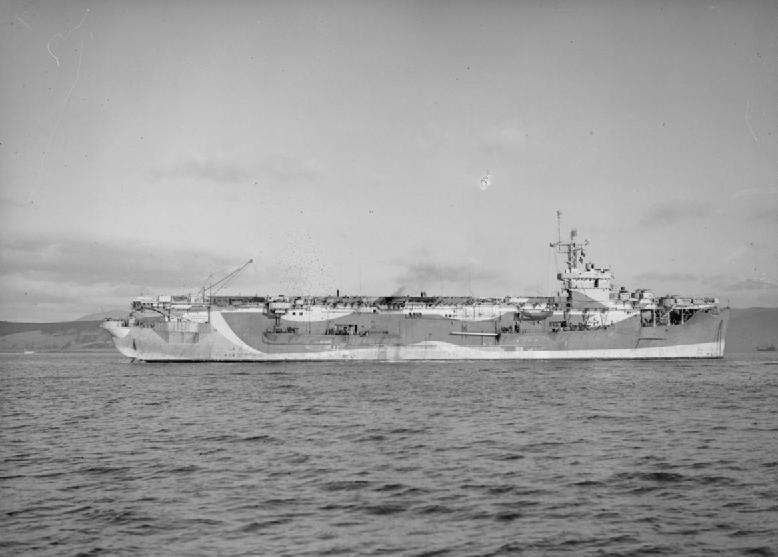
HMS Atheling

- RN Air Section Brunswick, Maine, (1 October 1943 – 8 January 1944)
- RN Air Section Norfolk, Virginia, (Deck Landing Training (DLT) USS Charger) (8 - 19 January 1944)
- HMS Begum (19 - 31 January 1944)
- Royal Naval Air Station Machrihanish (HMS Landrail), Argyll and Bute, (31 January - 1 February 1944)
- Royal Naval Air Station Burscough (HMS Ringtail), Lancashire, (1 - 26 February 1944)
- HMS Atheling (26 February - 13 April 1944)
- RN Air Section Minneriya, Ceylon, (13 April - 23 July 1944)
  - HMS Unicorn (Deck Landing Training (DLT) 6 - 8 June 1944)
- HMS Victorious (23 - 27 July 1944)
- Royal Naval Air Station Colombo Racecourse (HMS Berhunda), Ceylon, (27 July - 25 August 1944)
- HMS Atheling (25 August - 12 September 1944)
- Royal Naval Air Station Wingfield (HMS Malagas), Cape Town, South Africa, (12 - 13 September 1944)
- disbanded - (13 September 1944)

== Commanding officers ==
List of commanding officers of 1838 Naval Air Squadron with date of appointment:

- Lieutenant Commander(A) F.B.P. Sanderson, RNVR, from 1 October 1943
- Lieutenant Commander(A) M.S. Godson, RN, 28 June 1944
- disbanded - 13 September 1944

Note: Abbreviation (A) signifies Air Branch of the RN or RNVR.
