= 730 Naval Air Squadron =

Inactive flying squadron of the Royal Navy's Fleet Air Arm

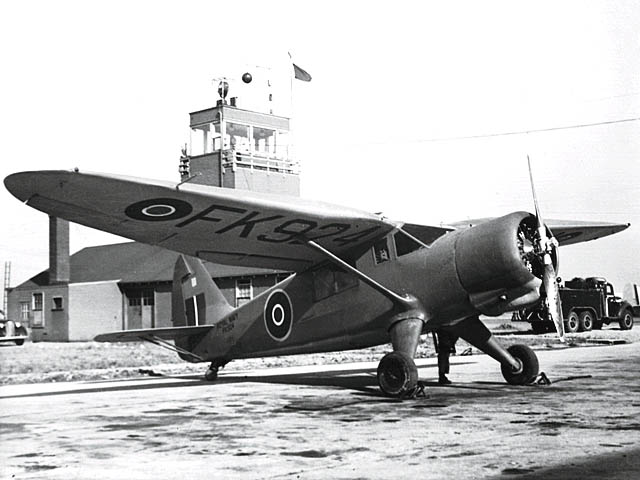
- Stinson V-77 Reliant I (FK924) of the Royal Navy, an example of the type used by 730 NAS
- Active: 1944–1945
- Disbanded: 1 August 1945
- Country: United Kingdom
- Branch: Royal Navy
- Type: Fleet Air Arm Second Line Squadron
- Role: Communications Squadron
- Size: Squadron
- Part of: Fleet Air Arm
- Home stations: RNAS Abbotsinch (HMS Sanderling); RNAS Ayr (HMS Wagtail)
- Aircraft: See Aircraft flown section for full list.

Insignia
- Identification Markings: AR0A+ (from November 1944)

730 Naval Air Squadron (730 NAS) was a Fleet Air Arm (FAA) naval air squadron of the United Kingdom’s Royal Navy (RN). It was active between 1944 and 1945 as a Communications Squadron. The squadron was formed and operated out of RNAS Abbotsinch (HMS Sanderling) from April to November 1944, by that point in time it operated four types of aircraft. It moved to RNAS Ayr (HMS Wagtail) and while there gained two more aircraft types. For the first three months of 1945 a detachment operated out of RNAS Machrihanish (HMS Landrail), however, the squadron remained at RNAS Ayr until disbanding in August 1945.

== History ==
=== Communications Squadron (1944–1945) ===
730 Naval Air Squadron was formed on the 17 April 1944 at RNAS Abbotsinch (HMS Sanderling) located in Paisley, Renfrewshire, in Scotland, where the squadron operated Stinson Reliant, a single-engine four-to-five seat high-wing monoplane liaison and training aircraft, and Beech Expediter II, a twin-engined, low-wing, tailwheel light aircraft, used for training, transport and utility work. Essentially the squadron came into existence by raising the Flag Officer Carrier Training flight to squadron status. It was tasked with transporting the Admiral, Commodore and senior staff around the naval air stations in Scotland.

Later that year, in August, Beech Traveller aircraft were acquired, an American biplane with an atypical negative wing stagger and these were soon followed by Fairey Firefly, a carrier-borne fighter and anti-submarine aircraft, in September. The squadron remained stationed at RNAS Abbotsinch for around seven months before moving to RNAS Ayr (HMS Wagtail) situated in Prestwick, South Ayrshire, in Scotland, on the 20 November 1944. From January 1945, Airspeed Oxford, a twin-engine monoplane aircraft and Fairey Swordfish, a biplane torpedo bomber aircraft, were added and these were in use until the squadron was disbanded.

From 1 January to 8 March 1945, a detachment from 730 Naval Air Squadron out of RNAS Ayr, operated from RNAS Machrihanish (HMS Landrail), located close to Campbeltown in Argyll and Bute, Scotland.

On the 1 August 1945, 730 Naval Air Squadron disbanded at RNAS Ayr (HMS Wagtail).

== Aircraft flown ==
The squadron has flown a number of different aircraft types, including:

- Stinson Reliant liaison and training aircraft (April 1944 - July 1945)
- Beech Expediter II trainer, transport and utility aircraft (1944)
- Supermarine Walrus amphibious maritime patrol aircraft (May - November 1944)
- Grumman Wildcat Mk V fighter aircraft (June - August 1944)
- Grumman Wildcat Mk VI fighter aircraft (June - August 1944)
- Fairey Fulmar Mk.II reconnaissance/fighter aircraft (June - September 1944)
- Vought Corsair Mk II fighter-bomber (June - October 1944)
- Percival Petrel communications aircraft (July - December 1944)
- Beech Traveller Mk. I utility aircraft (August 1944 - August 1945)
- Fairey Firefly F.I fighter aircraft (September 1944 - August 1945)
- Supermarine Sea Otter amphibious air-sea rescue aircraft (September 1994 - August 1945)
- Supermarine Seafire F Mk IIc fighter aircraft (October 1944)
- Fairey Swordfish II torpedo bomber (January 1945 - July 1945)
- Taylorcraft Auster I liaison aircraft (January - July 1945)
- Airspeed Oxford training aircraft (January 1945 - July 1945)

== Naval air stations ==
730 Naval Air Squadron operated from a number of naval air stations of the Royal Navy in Scotland:

- Royal Naval Air Station Abbotsinch (HMS Sanderling), Renfrewshire, (17 April 1944 - 20 November 1944)
- Royal Naval Air Station Ayr (HMS Wagtail), South Ayrshire, (20 November 1944 - 1 August 1945)
  - Royal Naval Air Station Donibristle (HMS Merlin), Fife, (Detachment 1944 - 1945)
  - Royal Naval Air Station Machrihanish (HMS Landrail), Argyll and Bute, (Detachment 1 January - 8 March 1945)
- disbanded - (1 August 1945)

== Commanding officers ==
List of commanding officers of 730 Naval Air Squadron with date of appointment:

- Lieutenant(A) G. Windsor, RNVR, from 17 April 1944
- Lieutenant(A) C. White, RNVR, from 1 December 1944
- Lieutenant J. C. Kennedy, RN, from 24 May 1945
- disbanded - 1 August 1945

Note: Abbreviation (A) signifies Air Branch of the RN or RNVR.
