= RNAS Machrihanish =

Former Royal Naval Air Station in Argyll and Bute, Scotland

RNAS Machrihanish (HMS Landrail)
- Machrihanish, Kintyre, Argyll and Bute in Scotland
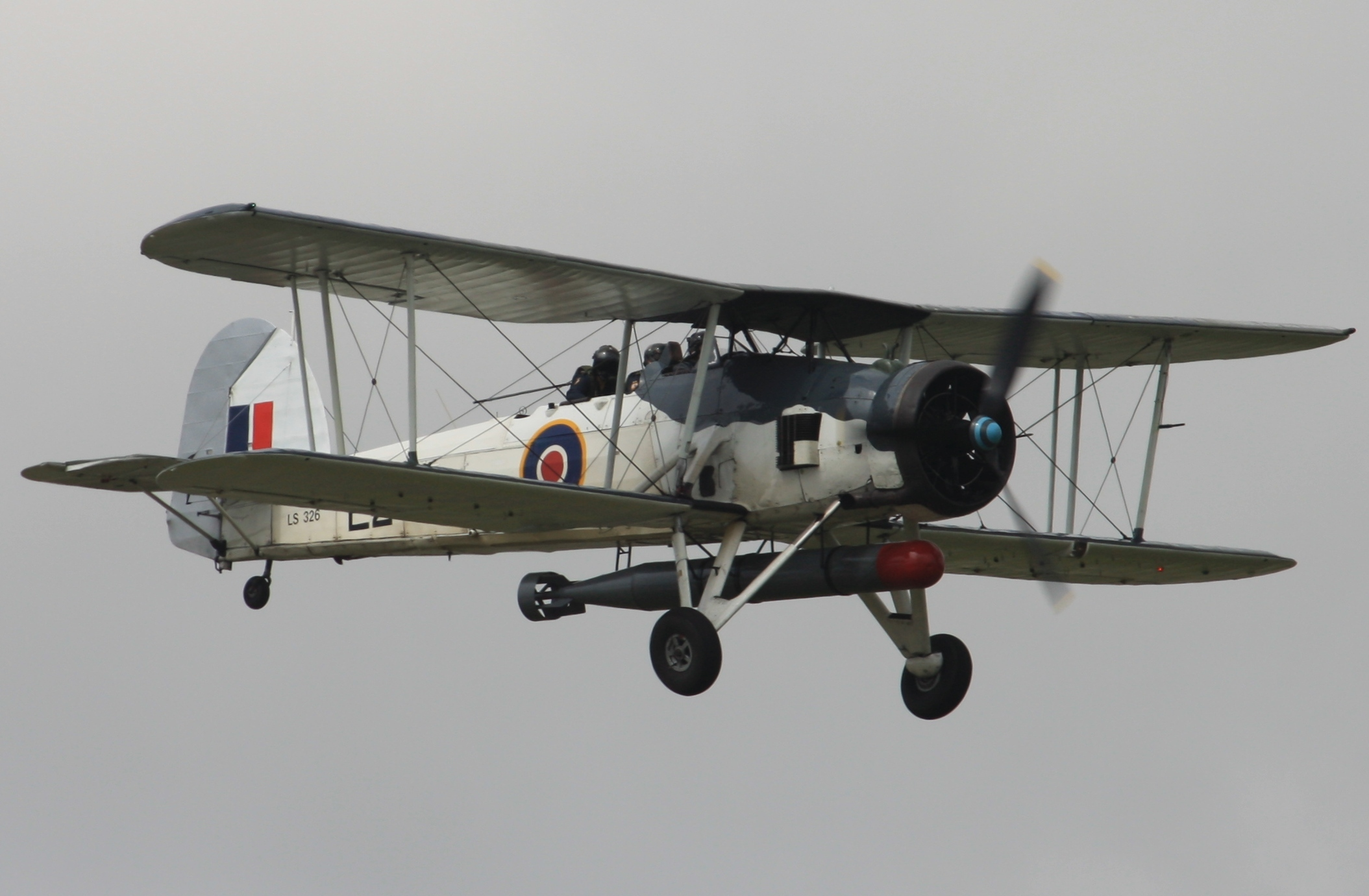
- Fairey Swordfish; a common sight at Machrihanish during the Second World War

- HMS Landrail

Site information
- Type: Naval Air Station
- Owner: Admiralty
- Operator: Royal Navy
- Controlled by: Fleet Air Arm

Location
- Location within Argyll and Bute RNAS Machrihanish (the United Kingdom)
- Coordinates: 55°26′30″N 5°41′55″W

Site history
- Built: 1941
- In use: 1941 - 1952
- Fate: Transferred to the Royal Air Force

Garrison information
- Occupants: Accommodation of disembarked squadrons; Deck Landing Training; Fleet Requirements Unit

Airfield information
- Elevation: 30 feet (9 m) AMSL
Runways
Direction	Length and surface
03/21	1,030 feet (314 m) Asphalt concrete
07/25	1,230 feet (375 m) Asphalt concrete
12/30	1,190 feet (363 m) Asphalt concrete
16/24	1,000 feet (305 m) Asphalt concrete

Royal Naval Air Station Machrihanish, (RNAS Machrihanish; or HMS Landrail), is a former Royal Navy air station located near Machrihanish, close to Campbeltown in Argyll and Bute, Scotland. The airfield opened during the Second World War and served at various times as a Fleet Air Arm naval air station, a Royal Air Force facility, and a United States Navy operating base. Part of the site later became the civilian Campbeltown Airport.

Situated 3 miles (5 km) to the west of Campbeltown on the western flank of the Kintyre Peninsula, Machrihanish is a former military airbase, recognised for its weather forecasting capabilities. The facility eventually featured an unusually lengthy runway 3,049 metres (10,003 ft), in addition to a substantial array of technical structures and living quarters.

== History ==
Machrihanish was established as a naval air station in 1916, operating maritime patrol aircraft and airships until 1918.

=== Second World War ===
The onset of the Second World War prompted the Royal Navy to take control of the original airfield and the surrounding area to the north. Sunley's, a construction firm based in England, initiated the development of a new airfield situated to the north of the existing location, on a flat expanse referred to as The Laggan. Upon its completion, the new airfield was inaugurated as Strabane Naval Air Station and commissioned HMS Landrail on 15 June 1941, subsequently becoming RNAS Machrihanish on 23 June 1941. The original airfield was reclassified as RNAS Campbeltown and commissioned as HMS Landrail II and continued to function as a satellite facility of the newly established airfield.

One of the longer-serving units was 772 Naval Air Squadron, which was based at the airfield from its opening until 1944. The squadron functioned as a Fleet Requirements Unit (FRU), carrying out support tasks such as target towing and later operating the Supermarine Walrus amphibious aircraft for air sea rescue duties.

Another early unit was 790 Naval Air Squadron, an air target towing unit which formed at and operated from Machrihanish for several months from June 1941 before being absorbed by 772 Squadron.

During the war a number of other Fleet Air Arm units made temporary visits, operating aircraft such as the Fairey Swordfish and Fairey Barracuda. Royal Air Force units also used the airfield, including No. 65 Squadron RAF, flying Supermarine Spitfire VB fighters. One of the more permanent residents in the later war years was 740 Naval Air Squadron, which operated communications aircraft at the station between December 1943 and September 1945.

Following the end of the war, flying activity declined and the airfield was placed under care and maintenance in April 1946.

=== Korean War reactivation ===
The station was reactivated in December 1951 during the Korean War, once again commissioned as HMS Landrail. During this period 799 Naval Air Squadron operated from the airfield as a refresher flying training unit, flying the Hawker Sea Fury fighter for pilots returning to service after periods in civilian life.

This renewed activity was short-lived, and the squadron departed in September 1952, after which regular military flying ceased once more and the station was again placed under care and maintenance.

=== NATO and United States Navy use ===
In the early 1960s the airfield underwent major redevelopment after being identified for use by NATO forces, particularly the United States Navy. The original Fleet Air Arm four-runway layout was replaced by a single large runway measuring approximately 10,000 feet (3,048 m) in length.

Thereafter the base developed in relation to NATO requirements during the Cold War, and was the focus of anti-submarine operations with US-controlled nuclear depth charges. A US Navy SEAL unit is also said to have been based here. £10 million was spent to upgrade the station in the early 1990s, keeping it on a care-and-maintenance basis to provide a runway for emergencies or in the event of conflict. The base remained a UK and NATO military base until 1997.

== Campbeltown Airport ==
Between the wars a commercial aerodrome was established and is still operated by the government-owned Highlands and Islands Airports Limited operates with IATA location code "GQJ". It uses the same single runway which, at 3,049m (10,000 feet), is the longest in Scotland. The terminal building are at the south-eastern end. There are scheduled flights to Glasgow.

== Units ==
A number of units were here at some point:

- 21st Naval TBR Wing
- 30th Naval Fighter Wing
- No. 65 Squadron RAF
- 730 Naval Air Squadron
- 740 Naval Air Squadron
- 744 Naval Air Squadron
- 751 Naval Air Squadron
- 766 Naval Air Squadron
- 768 Naval Air Squadron
- 772 Naval Air Squadron
- 784 Naval Air Squadron
- 787 Naval Air Squadron
- 790 Naval Air Squadron
- 799 Naval Air Squadron
- 800 Naval Air Squadron
- 801 Naval Air Squadron
- 802 Naval Air Squadron
- 804 Naval Air Squadron
- 805 Naval Air Squadron
- 806 Naval Air Squadron
- 807 Naval Air Squadron
- 808 Naval Air Squadron
- 809 Naval Air Squadron
- 810 Naval Air Squadron
- 811 Naval Air Squadron
- 812 Naval Air Squadron
- 813 Naval Air Squadron
- 814 Naval Air Squadron
- 815 Naval Air Squadron
- 816 Naval Air Squadron
- 817 Naval Air Squadron
- 818 Naval Air Squadron
- 819 Naval Air Squadron
- 820 Naval Air Squadron
- 821 Naval Air Squadron
- 822 Naval Air Squadron
- 823 Naval Air Squadron
- 824 Naval Air Squadron
- 825 Naval Air Squadron
- 826 Naval Air Squadron
- 827 Naval Air Squadron
- 828 Naval Air Squadron
- 829 Naval Air Squadron
- 830 Naval Air Squadron
- 831 Naval Air Squadron
- 832 Naval Air Squadron
- 833 Naval Air Squadron
- 834 Naval Air Squadron
- 835 Naval Air Squadron
- 836 Naval Air Squadron
- 837 Naval Air Squadron
- 838 Naval Air Squadron
- 840 Naval Air Squadron
- 841 Naval Air Squadron
- 842 Naval Air Squadron
- 845 Naval Air Squadron
- 846 Naval Air Squadron
- 847 Naval Air Squadron
- 848 Naval Air Squadron
- 849 Naval Air Squadron
- 850 Naval Air Squadron
- 852 Naval Air Squadron
- 853 Naval Air Squadron
- 854 Naval Air Squadron
- 855 Naval Air Squadron
- 856 Naval Air Squadron
- 857 Naval Air Squadron
- 878 Naval Air Squadron
- 879 Naval Air Squadron
- 880 Naval Air Squadron
- 881 Naval Air Squadron
- 882 Naval Air Squadron
- 883 Naval Air Squadron
- 884 Naval Air Squadron
- 885 Naval Air Squadron
- 886 Naval Air Squadron
- 887 Naval Air Squadron
- 888 Naval Air Squadron
- 890 Naval Air Squadron
- 891 Naval Air Squadron
- 892 Naval Air Squadron
- 893 Naval Air Squadron
- 894 Naval Air Squadron
- 895 Naval Air Squadron
- 897 Naval Air Squadron
- 899 Naval Air Squadron
- 1771 Naval Air Squadron
- 1792 Naval Air Squadron
- 1830 Naval Air Squadron
- 1832 Naval Air Squadron
- 1833 Naval Air Squadron
- 1834 Naval Air Squadron
- 1836 Naval Air Squadron
- 1838 Naval Air Squadron
- 1840 Naval Air Squadron
- 1848 Naval Air Squadron
- 1853 Naval Air Squadron
