= 740 Naval Air Squadron =

Inactive flying squadron of the Royal Navy's Fleet Air Arm

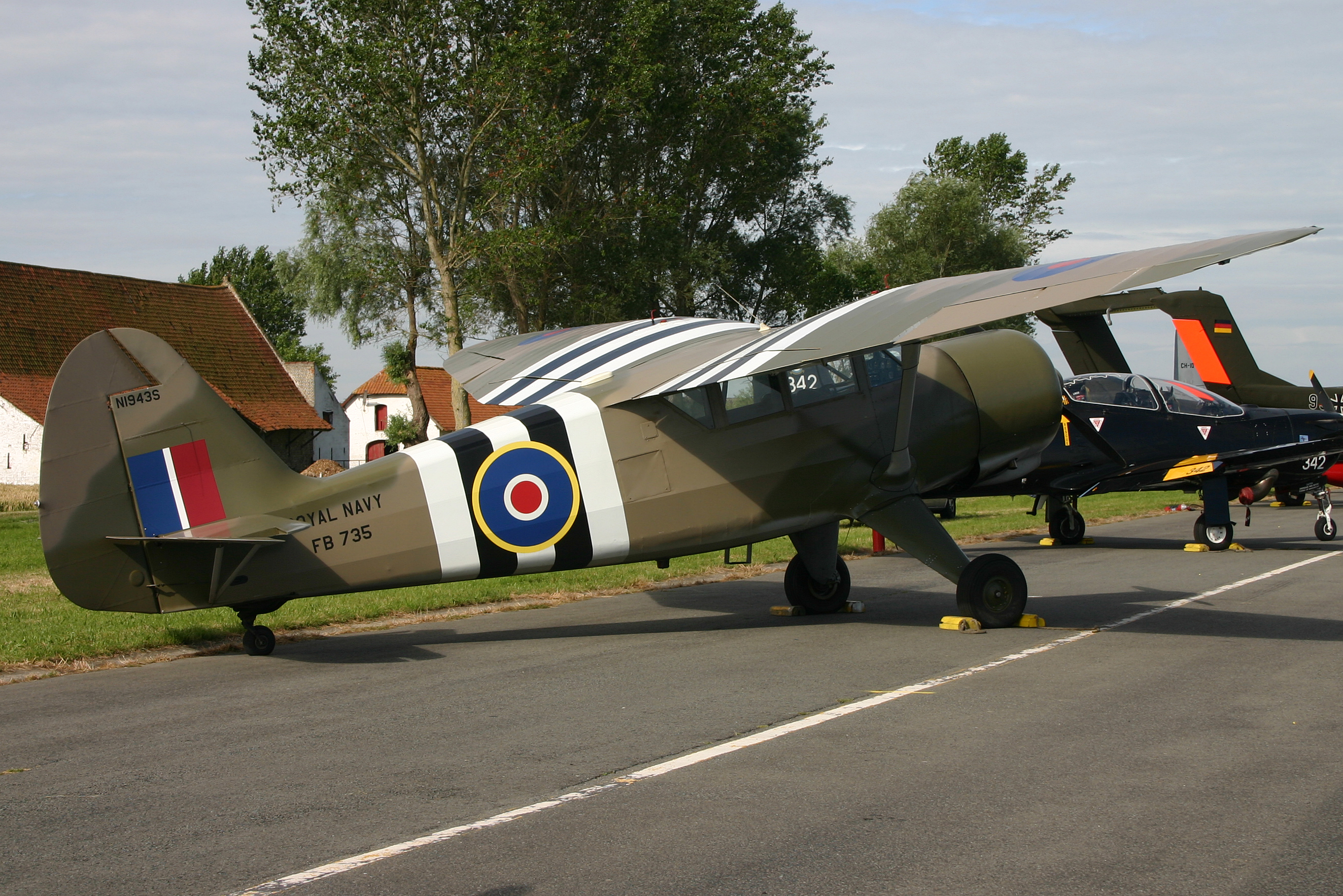
- A Stinson Reliant I, an example of the type used by 740 NAS
- Active: 1943; 1943–1945
- Disbanded: 1 September 1945
- Country: United Kingdom
- Branch: Royal Navy
- Type: Fleet Air Arm Second Line Squadron
- Role: Observer Training Squadron; Communications Squadron
- Size: Squadron
- Part of: Fleet Air Arm
- Home station: RNAS Arbroath; RNAS Machrihanish
- Aircraft: See Aircraft flown section for full list.

Insignia
- Identification Markings: M9A+ (all types 1944-1945)

740 Naval Air Squadron (740 NAS) was a Fleet Air Arm (FAA) naval air squadron of the United Kingdom’s Royal Navy (RN). It was initially active between May and August in 1943, formed as an Observer Training Squadron at HMS Condor, RNAS Arbroath, Angus, Scotland. From December 1943 to September 1945 it was a Communications Squadron formed at and operated from HMS Landrail, at RNAS Machrihanish, Argyll and Bute, Scotland.

== History ==
=== Observer Training School (1943) ===
740 Naval Air Squadron formed on 4 May 1943, at RNAS Arbroath (HMS Condor), as an Observer Training Squadron, as part of No. 2 Observer School. It was equipped with Supermarine Walrus, an amphibious maritime patrol aircraft, plus a few Fairey Swordfish, a biplane torpedo bomber and Vought Kingfisher, an American catapult-launched observation floatplane. The squadron also dispersed flying to Dundee, on the River Tay and where the squadron disbanded into 751 Naval Air Squadron on 5 August 1943.

=== Communications Squadron (1943–1945) ===
740 Naval Air Squadron reformed on 30 December 1943 at RNAS Machrihanish (HMS Landrail), as a Communications Squadron. It was formed out of the communications flight of 772 Naval Air Squadron. It used the amphibious maritime patrol aircraft Supermarine Walrus and later Supermarine Sea Otter for transportation around the Islands, Lochs and Royal Navy ships in the Firth of Clyde. The squadron also operated various types of other aircraft including Stinson Reliant, a four-five seat liaison and training aircraft, Beech Traveller, a utility aircraft, de Havilland Dominie, a six–eight passenger short-haul airliner, Airspeed Oxford, a twin-engine training aircraft and Avro Anson, a twin-engine multi-role training aircraft.

740 Naval Air Squadron disbanded at RNAS Machrihanish (HMS Landrail) on 1 September 1945, the squadron having been one of its permanent residents between December 1943 and September 1945.

== Aircraft flown ==
The squadron has flown a number of different aircraft types, including:

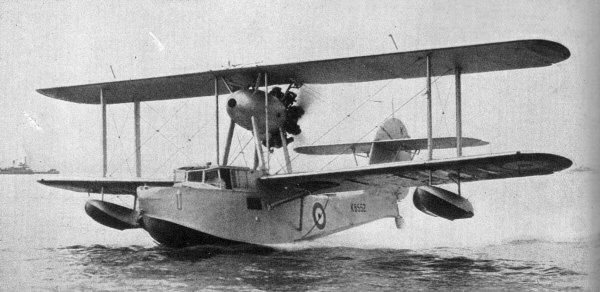
Supermarine Walrus

- Supermarine Walrus amphibious maritime patrol aircraft (May - August 1943, January - October 1944)
- Stinson Reliant liaison and training aircraft (December 1943 - August 1945)
- Vought Kingfisher I observation floatplane (1943)
- Fairey Swordfish torpedo bomber (1943)
- de Havilland Dominie short-haul airliner (1943)
- Fairey Fulmar Mk.I reconnaissance/fighter aircraft (January 1944)
- Airspeed Oxford training aircraft (January 1944 - March 1945)
- Beech Traveller Mk. I utility aircraft (July - November 1944)
- Supermarine Sea Otter ABR.I amphibious maritime patrol aircraft (October 1944 - August 1945)
- Miles Martinet TT.Mk I target tug (November 1944)
- Miles Master II advanced trainer aircraft (November 1944)
- Avro Anson multi-role training aircraft (January - August 1945)

== Naval air stations ==
740 Naval Air Squadron operated from a couple of naval air stations of the Royal Navy, in the United Kingdom:

1943

- Royal Naval Air Station Arbroath (HMS Condor), Angus, (4 May 1943 - 5 August 1943)
- disbanded - (5 August 1943)

1943 - 1945

- Royal Naval Air Station Machrihanish (HMS Landrail), Argyll and Bute, (30 December 1943 - 1 September 1945)
  - Royal Naval Air Station Ayr (HMS Wagtail), South Ayrshire, (Detachment 26 January 1944 - 10 August 1945)
- disbanded - (1 September 1945)

== Commanding officers ==
List of commanding officers of 740 Naval Air Squadron with date of appointment:

1943

- Lieutenant Commander D.H. Angel, RN, from 4 May 1943
- disbanded - 5 August 1943

1943 - 1945

- Lieutenant Commander(A) L.F. Diggens, RNVR, from 30 December 1943
- Lieutenant Commander(A) L.T. Summerfield, RNVR, from 23 April 1945
- disbanded - 1 September 1945

Note: Abbreviation (A) signifies Air Branch of the RN or RNVR.

Lieutenant Commander T.W. Harrington, DSC & Bar, RN
