= Durban Airport =

Durban Airport can refer to one of three airports:

- King Shaka International Airport (IATA: DUR, ICAO: FALE), the primary airport serving the Durban area
- Durban International Airport (formerly Louis Botha Airport), the airport serving Durban from 1951 to 2010
- Stamford Hill Aerodrome (also known as Durban Municipal Airport), the original airport serving Durban from 1927 to the 1950s.
