= 710 Naval Air Squadron =

Inactive flying squadron of the Royal Navy's Fleet Air Arm

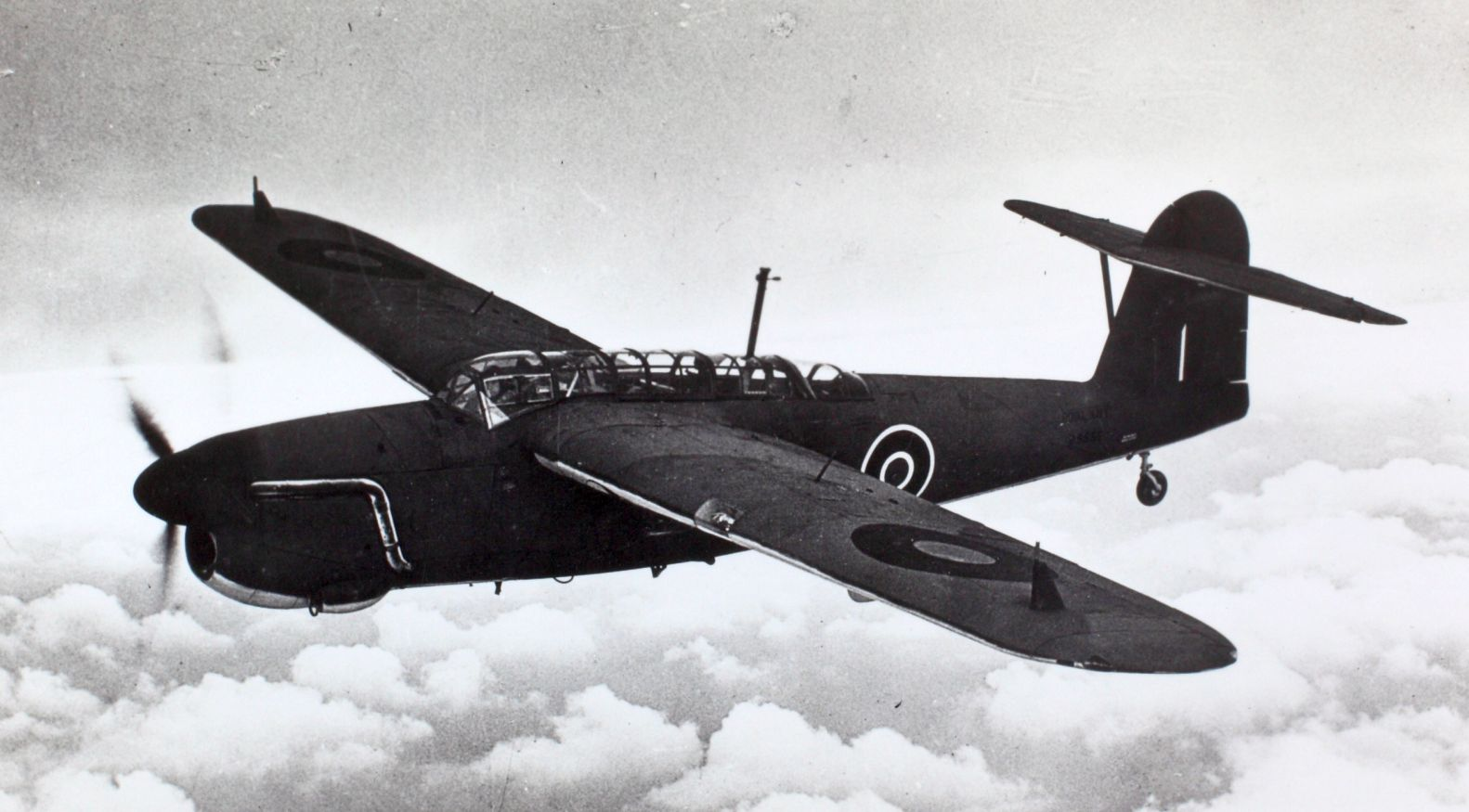
- Fairey Barracuda, an example of the type used by 710 NAS
- Active: 1939–1943; 1944–1945
- Disbanded: 20 December 1945
- Country: United Kingdom
- Branch: Royal Navy
- Type: Fleet Air Arm Second Line Squadron
- Role: Seaplane Squadron; Torpedo Training Squadron
- Size: Squadron
- Part of: Fleet Air Arm
- Home station: See Naval air stations section for full list.

Insignia
- Identification Markings: A9A+ (Walrus); 9A+ (Walrus later); AR2A+ to AR7A+ (Barracuda); R2A+ to R7A+ (Barracuda later)

Aircraft flown
- Bomber: Fairey Barracuda; Fairey Swordfish
- Patrol: Supermarine Walrus
- Trainer: Avro Anson

710 Naval Air Squadron (710 NAS), also referred to as 710 Squadron, is an inactive Fleet Air Arm (FAA) naval air squadron of the United Kingdom’s Royal Navy (RN). It was last active at HMS Urley, RNAS Ronaldsway, Isle of Man, from 7 October 1944, as a Torpedo Training Squadron, flying Fairey Barracuda and some Fairey Swordfish. The squadron was disbanded after the war.

It was first created as a Seaplane Squadron for the seaplane tender HMS Albatross at HMS Daedalus, RNAS Lee-on-Solent, Hampshire, in August 1939. It started with six Supermarine Walrus aircraft, plus three more kept in reserve. The squadron was deployed on the ship based in Freetown, Sierra Leone, where it focused on hunting U-boats and commerce raiders. In mid-1940, a shore base was set up, allowing for more frequent operations from land. The squadron and its aircraft participated in the Madagascar Campaign in 1942. It was disbanded at HMS Daedalus on 14 October 1943.

== History ==
=== Seaplane squadron (1939-1943) ===
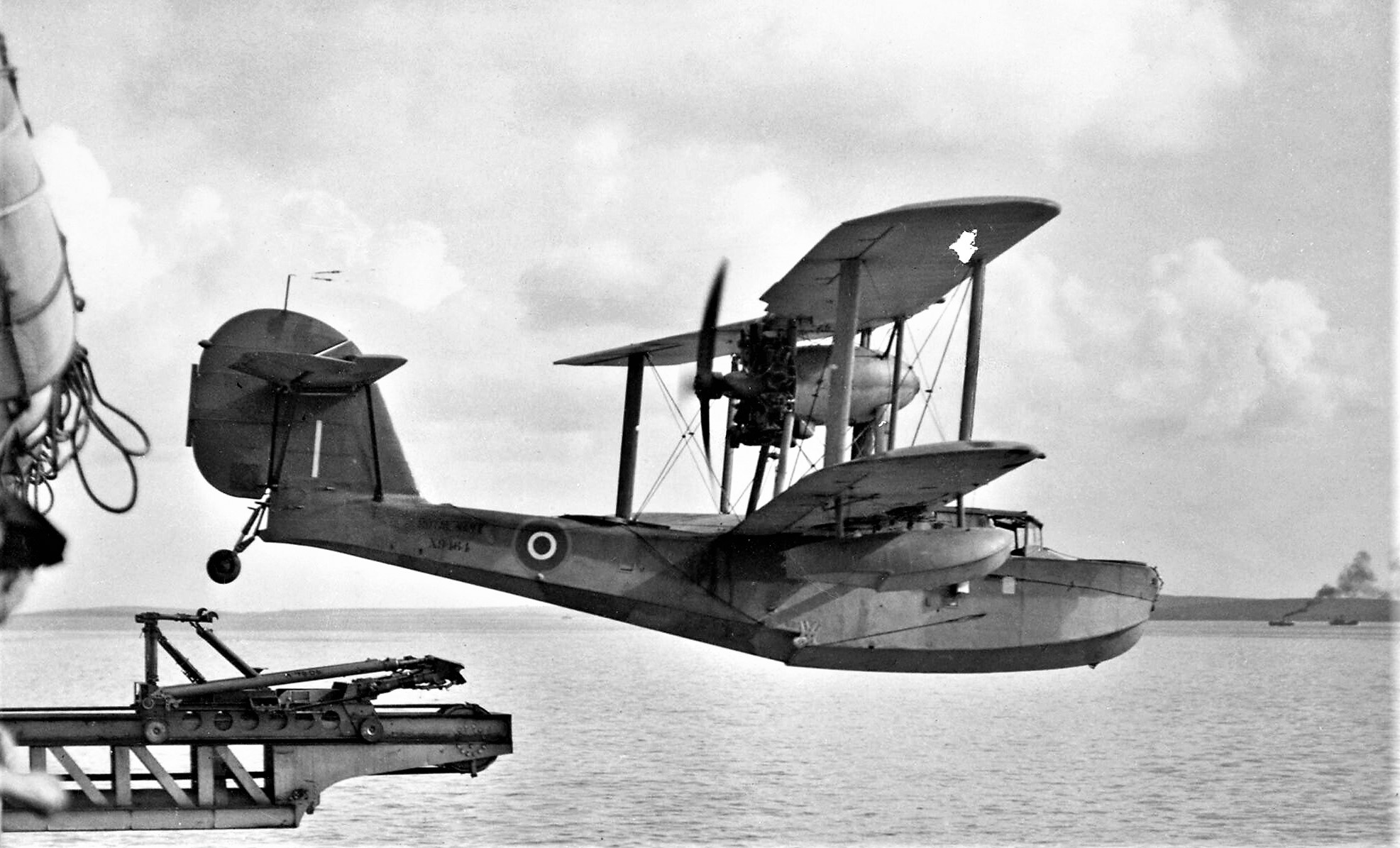
A Supermarine Walrus amphibian airplane being launched from the catapult deck of HMS Bermuda, an example of the type use

710 Naval Air Squadron was a seaplane squadron that was stood up at RNAS Lee-on-Solent (HMS Daedalus), Hampshire, on 23 August 1939. They were equipped with the Supermarine Walrus amphibious maritime patrol aircraft and did multiple deployments onboard HMS Albatross, a seaplane tender.

On 1 September the squadron commenced its journey, setting sail for West Africa and reaching Freetown, Sierra Leone, a week later. During its time in Freetown, the squadron undertook various responsibilities, including providing escorts for local shipping and conducting anti-submarine patrols. Additionally, it facilitated towed targets for the local anti-aircraft defenses and for visiting vessels. In the initial days at Freetown, another significant task involved conducting aerial photography to enhance the accuracy of the region's maps and charts.

A separate Flight was engaged in anti-submarine operations from Dakar in Senegal, as well as from Bathurst in The Gambia, until the arrival of Royal Air Force (RAF) flying boats. By the conclusion of July 1940, airstrips had been developed at Wellington, located 10 miles (16 km) away and Hastings, situated 15 miles (24 km) away, to which the squadron progressively relocated. By May 1941, the squadron had firmly established itself at Hastings, which had since grown into a Royal Navy Air Station.

In September 1941, HMS Albatross took on six aircraft to assist with convoy escort duties, and by December, three of these aircraft had reached Piarco, Trinidad. Subsequently, one aircraft was transported from Trinidad on the tanker RFA Broomdale to the Falkland Islands, forming what was referred to as 'Y' Flight; however, this detachment concluded in March when the aircraft was lost in a crash. In July, HMS Albatross proceeded to Mayotte in the Comoro Islands, where it served as a temporary base for RAF operated Consolidated Catalina amphibious maritime patrol aircraft. During this period, two Supermarine Walrus aircraft were deployed to patrol the Mozambique Channel and later played a role in the Battle of Madagascar.

In November, the vessel made its way to Durban, South Africa and 710 Naval Air Squadron was disembarked to SAAF Station Stamford Hill, where the Admiralty had established a RN Air Section.

By March 1943, the ship departed for Bombay, India, with 710 Naval Air Squadron embarked, transitioning to serve as a Combined Operations training ship. The squadron conducted training exercises at RAF Santa Cruz in collaboration with the British Army until they re-embarked in July for a return journey to Africa. In August, the Supermarine Walrus aircraft were disembarked at Kilindini Harbour and subsequently transported to Nairobi.

The squadron was officially disbanded at RNAS Lee-on-Solent on 14 October 1943.

=== Torpedo Training squadron (1944-1945) ===
710 Naval Air Squadron was re-established at RNAS Ronaldsway (HMS Urley) on the Isle of Man in October 1944, serving as a Torpedo Training squadron. As a component of No.1 Naval Operational Training Unit, it collaborated with 713 Naval Air Squadron to deliver Part III of the Torpedo Bomber Reconnaissance Course, utilising Fairey Barracuda aircraft alongside a limited number of Fairey Swordfish. The squadron was disbanded at RNAS Ronaldsway in December 1945.

== Aircraft flown ==
710 Naval Air Squadron operated a number of different aircraft types and variants:

- Supermarine Walrus amphibious maritime patrol aircraft (August 1939 - August 1943)
- Fairey Swordfish I torpedo bomber (October 1944 - May 1945)
- Fairey Barracuda Mk II torpedo and dive bomber (October 1944 - December 1945)
- Fairey Barracuda Mk III torpedo and dive bomber (October 1944 - December 1945)
- Avro Anson Mk I multirole training aircraft (April - July 1945)
- Fairey Swordfish II torpedo bomber (April - December 1945)

== Naval air stations ==
710 Naval Air Squadron operated from a single naval air station of the Royal Navy, in England, many airbases overseas and a seaplane tender of the Royal Navy, throughout its existence:

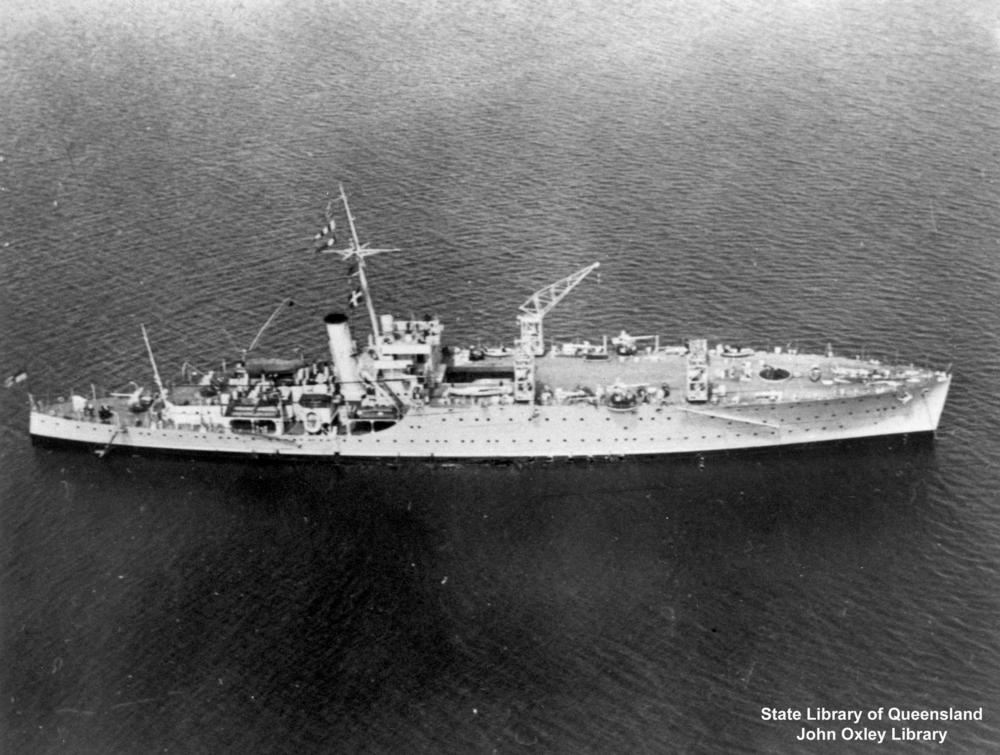
HMS Albatross

1939 - 1943

- Royal Naval Air Station Lee-on-Solent (HMS Daedalus), Hampshire, (23 - 26 August 1939)
- Royal Air Force Mount Batten, Devon, (26 August - 8 September 1939)
- HMS Albatross (1 September 1939 (at Freetown from 8 September 1939 – 14 May 1941)
  - Dakar, Senegal/Royal Air Force Bathurst, The Gambia, (Detachments November 1939 - June 1940)
  - HMS Hermes (Detachment four aircraft 1–17 May 1940)
  - RN Air Section Hastings, Sierra Leone, (Detachments 31 July 1940 – 14 May 1941)
  - Wellington, Sierra Leone, (Detachments 31 July 1940 – 7 April 1941)
- RN Air Section Hastings, Sierra Leone, (14 May - 25 September 1941)
- HMS Albatross (25 September - 17 November 1941)
- RN Air Section Hastings, Sierra Leone, (17 November 1941 – 24 April 1942)
  - HMS Albatross (Detachments three aircraft 23 December 1941 – 2 January 1942)
  - Royal Naval Air Station Piarco (HMS Goshawk), Trinidad and Tobago, (Detachment two aircraft 2 January - 11 April 1942)
  - Port Stanley, Falkland Islands, (Detachment one aircraft, 'Y' Flight 28 January - 1 March 1942)
  - HMS Albatross (Detachment two aircraft 11–23 April 1942)
- HMS Albatross (24 April - 20 July 1942)
  - Royal Air Force Port Reitz, Kenya, (Detachments 7 June - 18 July 1942)
  - Royal Naval Aircraft Repair Yard Nairobi Nairobi, Kenya, (Detachment two aircraft 9 June - 4 July 1942)
- Royal Air Force Port Reitz, Kenya, (20 July - 19 November 1942)
  - HMS Albatross (Detachment two aircraft 21 July - 5 August 1942)
  - HMS Albatross (Detachment two aircraft 5 September - 3 October 1942)
- HMS Albatross (19 - 29 November 1942)
- RN Air Section Durban, Durban, South Africa, (29 November 1942 – 25 February 1943)
  - Maputo, Mozambique, (Detachment two aircraft 5–22 February 1943)
- HMS Albatross (25 February - 29 March 1943)
  - RN Air Section Durban, Durban, Cape Town, (Detachment three aircraft 26 February - 4 March 1943)
- Royal Air Force Santa Cruz, India, (29 March - 27 July 1943)
  - HMS Albatross (Detachment one aircraft 24 April - 5 May 1943)
  - HMS Albatross (Detachment two aircraft 20–25 June 1943)
- HMS Albatross (24 July - 13 August 1943)
- Royal Naval Aircraft Repair Yard Nairobi (HMS Korongo), Nairobi, Kenya, (aircraft) (13 August - 12 October 1943)
- Royal Naval Air Station Lee-on-Solent (HMS Daedalus), Hampshire, (12 - 14 October 1943)
- disbanded - (14 October 1943)

1944 - 1945

- Royal Naval Air Station Ronaldsway (HMS UIrley), Isle of Man, (7 October 1944 – 20 December 1945)
- disbanded - (20 December 1945)

== Commanding officers ==
List of commanding officers of 710 Naval Air Squadron, with date of appointment:

1939 - 1943

- Lieutenant Commander H.L. Hayes, RN, from 23 August 1939
- Captain W.H.C. Manson, RM, from 8 August 1940
- Lieutenant Commander C.E. Fenwick, RN, from 14 July
- Lieutenant Commander J.E. Smallwood, RN, from 10 March 1942
- Lieutenant E.F. Pritchard, RN, from 1 September 1942
- Lieutenant(A) M.J.J. Harris, RNVR, from 13 May 1943
- disbanded - 14 October 1943

1944 - 1945

- Lieutenant Commander(A) D.R. Conner, RNVR, 7 October 1944
- Lieutenant Commander J.F. Arnold, RN, from 1 August 1945
- disbanded - 20 December 1945

Note: Abbreviation (A) signifies Air Branch of the RN or RNVR.
