= 726 Naval Air Squadron =

Inactive flying squadron of the Royal Navy's Fleet Air Arm

- Squadron badge
- Active: 1943–1945
- Disbanded: 3 November 1945
- Country: United Kingdom
- Branch: Royal Navy
- Type: Fleet Air Arm Second Line Squadron
- Role: Fleet Requirements Unit
- Size: Squadron
- Part of: Fleet Air Arm
- Home station: RN Air Section Durban (HMS Kongoni)
- Aircraft: See Aircraft flown section for full list.

Insignia
- Squadron Badge Description: Per fess blue and Barry wavy of six white and blue, two assegais in saltire points in base surmounted by a Zulu shield all proper (1945)

726 Naval Air Squadron (726 NAS), also referred to as 726 Squadron, is an inactive Fleet Air Arm (FAA) naval air squadron of the United Kingdom’s Royal Navy (RN). It was formed as a Fleet Requirements Unit from 1943 to 1945, operating out of RN Air Section Durban (HMS Kongoni), located at SAAF Station Stamford Hill, Durban, South Africa, during its existence. It operated various aircraft including, Bristol Beaufighter, Boulton Paul Defiant, Fairey Fulmar, North American Harvard, Vought Kingfisher, Miles Martinet and Fairey Swordfish.

== History ==
=== Fleet Requirements Unit (1943–1945) ===
726 Naval Air Squadron formed at RN Air Section Durban (HMS Kongoni), located at SAAF Station Stamford Hill, Durban, South Africa, on 7 July 1943, as a Fleet Requirements Unit. The squadron was initially equipped with two Vought Kingfisher landplane aircraft. From August 1943 the squadron received Fairey Swordfish biplane torpedo bomber and Fairey Fulmar carrier-borne reconnaissance aircraft/fighter aircraft, however, the Fairey Fulmar were gone by October.

In December 1943, the squadron received Boulton Paul Defiant, an interceptor aircraft, repurposed as a target tug aircraft, however, six months later these were withdrawn, replaced by Miles Martinet, a target tug aircraft, designed specifically for target towing, in June 1944. Additionally, Bristol Beaufighter multi-role aircraft arrived in that month as well, but were gone during the following September. North American Harvard an American single-engined advanced trainer aircraft, arrived around May 1945, however, 726 Naval Air Station disbanded on the 3 November 1945.

== Aircraft flown ==
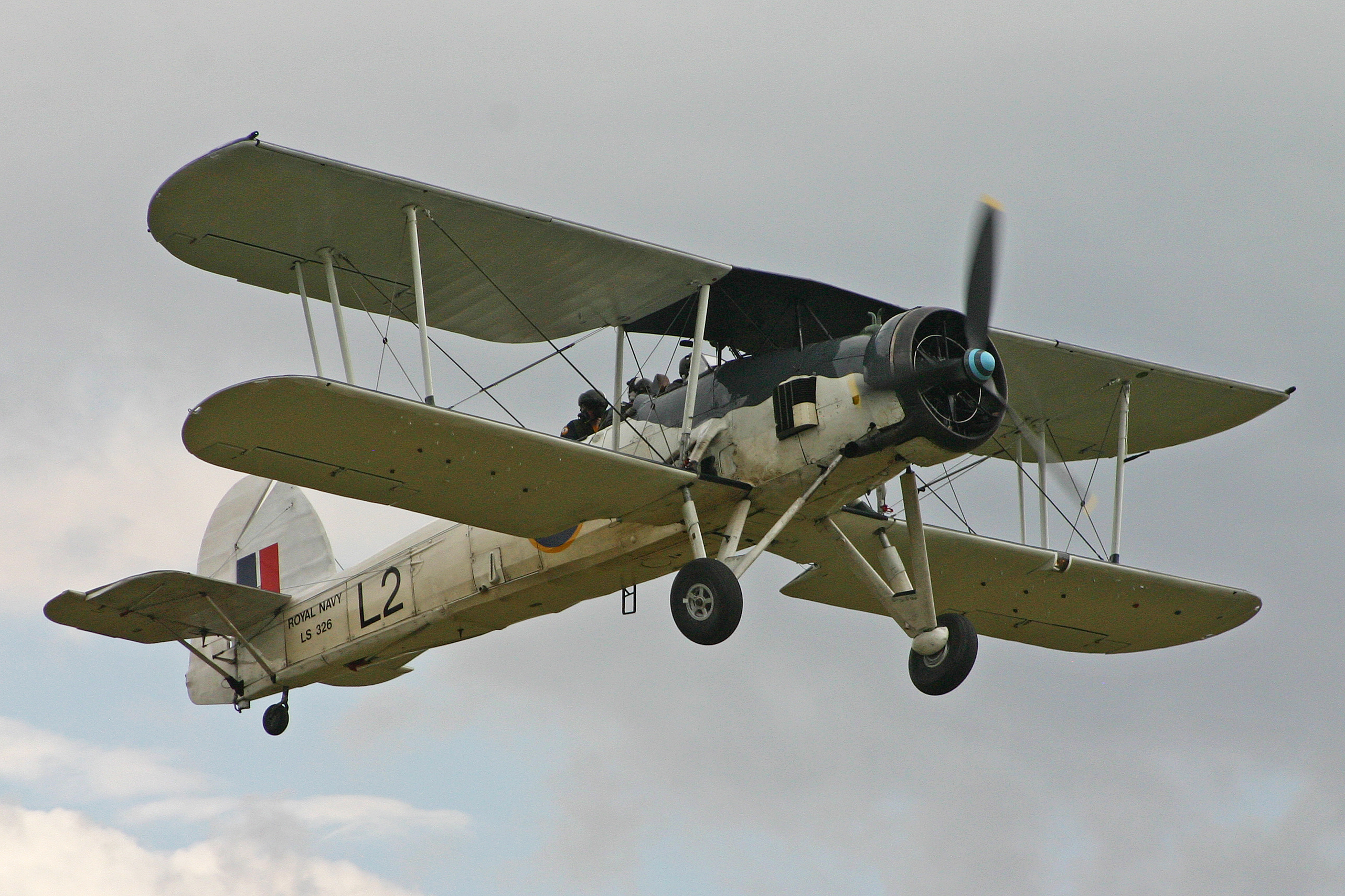
Fairey Swordfish II, an example of the type used by 726 NAS

The squadron has flown a number of different aircraft types, including:

- Vought Kingfisher I observation floatplane (Jul 1943 - Sep 1944)
- Fairey Swordfish I biplane torpedo bomber (Aug 1943 - Nov 1945)
- Fairey Swordfish II biplane torpedo bomber (Aug 1943 - Nov 1945)
- Fairey Fulmar Mk.II carrier-borne reconnaissance / fighter aircraft (Aug 1943 - Oct 1943)
- Supermarine Walrus Amphibious maritime patrol aircraft (Oct 1943 - Nov 1945)
- Boulton Paul Defiant TT Mk I target tug aircraft (Dec 1943 - May 1944)
- Miles Martinet TT.Mk I target tug aircraft (Jun 1944 - Nov 1945)
- Bristol Beaufighter Mark IIF multirole combat aircraft (Jun 1944 - Sep 1944)
- North American Harvard III advanced trainer aircraft (May 1945 - Nov 1945)

== Naval air stations ==
726 Naval Air Squadron operated from lodger facilities for one disembarked Royal Navy squadron, at a South African Air Force Station in South Africa:

- RN Air Section Durban (HMS Kongoni), Durban, South Africa, (7 July 1943 - 3 November 1945)
- disbanded - (3 November 1945)

== Commanding officers ==
List of commanding officers of 726 Naval Air Squadron, with dater of appointment:

- Lieutenant Commander(A) F.G. Hood, SANF(V), from July 1943
- Lieutenant(A) W.A. McElroy, RNVR, from January 1945 (died of illness 23 February 1945)
- unknown - February 1945 - June 1945
- Lieutenant(A) D.C. Langley, SANF(F), from June 1945
- disbanded - 3 November 1945

Note: Abbreviation (A) signifies Air Branch of the RN or RNVR.
