= Stamford Hill Aerodrome =

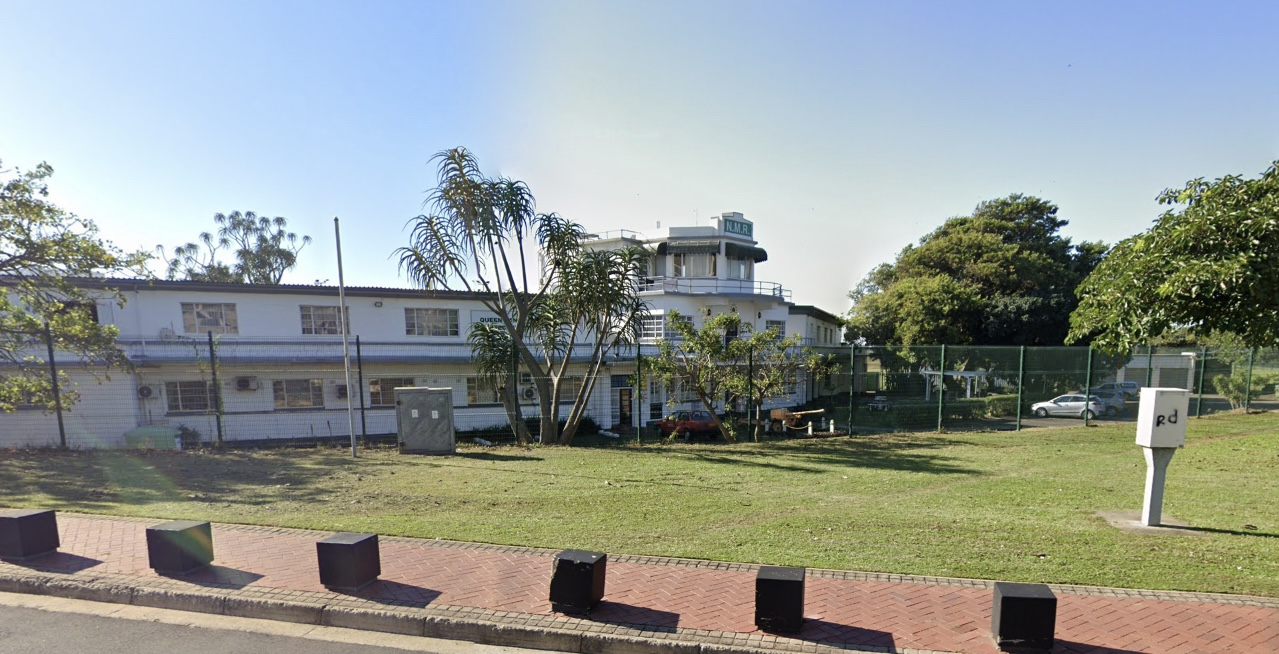
- The control tower of Stamford Hill Aerodrome which was repurposed for the headquarters of the Natal Mounted Rifles.
- IATA: none; ICAO: none

Summary
- Airport type: Defunct
- Owner: South African Air Force
- Operator: Durban Corporation
- Location: Durban, South Africa
- Opened: 1927
- Closed: 1950s
- Elevation AMSL: 10 ft / 3 m
- Coordinates: 29°49′40″S 31°02′00″E
- Interactive map of Stamford Hill Aerodrome

Runways
Direction	Length		Surface
Direction	ft	m	Surface
01/19	1,300	396	Grass, all weather, slightly bumpy
02/20	700	213	Grass, all weather, liable to be soft in places after rain

Stamford Hill Aerodrome (also known as Durban Municipal Airport) was an airport in Durban, South Africa. The airport was replaced by Louis Botha Airport (Durban International Airport) in 1951.

== History ==
Stamford Hill Aerodrome was built as an all-weather airfield in 1927. By 1928, the Durban Aero Club was formed with two Avro Avians. The club was based in a club-house and a hangar in the south-west corner of the Aerodrome. In the same year, Sir Alan Cobham landed in Durban at the start of his 25,000 mile flight around Africa.

In 1935, the minister of defence announced the construction of an air station building in the north-east corner of the airfield. The building consisted of a passenger hall, baggage rooms, public waiting rooms, a restaurant, and ticket offices. On 5 December 1936, Stamford Hill Aerodrome was opened with an air pageant. Following the opening was a display of 30 planes and a crowd of 30,000 people to witness the formation of Hawker Furies.

In 1937, the British Government announced that letters to any destination owned by the United Kingdom would be free of surcharge. Due to this, Imperial Airways charted and used Durban as the South African Destination. In the following year, plans for a flying boat base at Durban for Imperial Airways operations were considered. Following the plan, the Assembly provided £50,000 of the £76.000 to be spent on the construction of the sea plane base.

=== World War II ===
At the beginning of World War II, Stamford Hill Aerodrome was handed over to the military and ceased all civil operations. During April 1942, an R.N. Air Section was established at the base. There was also a military barracks with a capacity of 500 men built in the North-Eastern corner of the airfield, and on August 1 1946, the airport was handed back to the Durban Corporation.

=== Units ===
Units that were based at Stamford Hill Aerodrome:

- 710 Seaplane Squadron, 1942 - 1943, equipped with Fairey Swordfish floatplanes.
- 726 Fleet Requirements Unit, 1943 - 1945, equipped with Vought Kingfisher, Bristol Beaufighter, Boulton Paul Defiant, Fairey Fulmar, North American Harvard, Miles Martinet, and Swordfish.
- 806 Fleet Fighter Squadron, 1942, equipped with 6 x Fulmar II.
- 810 Torpedo, Spotter, Reconnaissance Squadron, 1942, equipped with 9 to 15 Swordfish I & II.
- 814 Torpedo, Bomber, Reconnaissance Squadron, 1941, equipped with Swordfish Is.
- 817 Torpedo, Bomber, Reconnaissance Squadron, 1944 - 1945, equipped with Barracuda IIs.
- 827 Torpedo, Spottier, Reconnaissance Squadron, 1942, equipped with 12 Albacore Is.
- 829 Torpedo, Spottier, Reconnaissance Squadron, 1942, equipped with 12 Swordfish II.
- 834 Torpedo, Bomber, Reconnaissance Squadron, 1944, equipped with Swordfish II & Seafire L.IIc.
- 851 Torpedo, Bomber, Reconnaissance Squadron, 1945, equipped with 12 Avenger II.
- 881 Fleet Fighter Squadron, 1942, equipped with 9 Martlet II.
- 896 Single Seat Fighter Squadron, 1945, equipped with 24 Hellcat FB.II.

== Closure ==
In 1951, Louis Botha Airport (now Durban International Airport) was opened and replaced Stamford Hill Aerodrome. Re-development plans such as converting the airfield into a sports complex were made. In early 1954, an air show hosting de Havilland Vampire jet fighters was held to commemorate the 1953 coronation of Queen Elizabeth II.

Built in 1937, the control tower was repurposed into the headquarters for the Natal Mounted Rifles in Art Deco style.

== Layout ==
On the seaplane base arranged by the South African Air Force (SAAF) was a concrete slipway, a 95 x 135 hangar and concrete apron, two small jetties, and a windsock. Stored aviation fuel on site were 1 tank of 12.294 gallons (100 Octane), 6 tanks of 7.055 gallons (87 Octane), and 1 tank of 200 gallons (77 Octane). Two 150 x 150 sized hangars, two 130 x 100 hangars, and approximately one 60 x 80 hangar. Only one 130 x 100 sized hangar was in use by the RN Air Section.
