= 10th Naval Fighter Wing =

Royal Navy Fleet Air Arm aircraft wing

- White Ensign
- Active: 14 October 1944 – February 1945
- Country: United Kingdom
- Branch: Royal Navy
- Type: Naval fighter Wing
- Role: Fleet fighter operations
- Size: Two squadrons
- Part of: Fleet Air Arm
- Home station: RNAS Eglinton
- Aircraft: Vought Corsair
- Engagements: World War II

Commanders
- Wing Leader: Major P.P. Nelson-Gracie, RM

Insignia
- Wing Code: O

10th Naval Fighter Wing ("10 Wing") was a Fleet Air Arm formation of the Royal Navy formed at RNAS Eglinton on 14 October 1944. It comprised 1843 and 1845 Naval Air Squadrons, both equipped with Vought Corsair fighter bomber aircraft and earmarked for service with the British Pacific Fleet. The wing's headquarters was formed at RNAS Eglinton, while 1843 Squadron was allocated to the escort carriers HMS Arbiter and 1845 Squadron to HMS Slinger.

== History ==
=== Formation ===
The 10th Naval Fighter Wing was formed at RNAS Eglinton, County Londonderry, Northern Ireland, on 14 October 1944 with 1843 and 1845 Naval Air Squadrons. Each squadron was earmarked to join an escort carrier for service with the British Pacific Fleet, with 1843 Squadron allocated to Ruler-class escort carrier HMS Arbiter and 1845 squadron to sister ship HMS Slinger.

Historic England identifies the 10th Naval Fighter Wing among the Naval Wings formed during the Second World War. It records that the wing comprised two Vought Corsair squadrons attached to HMS Arbiter and HMS Slinger, with its headquarters formed at RNAS Eglinton in October 1944. The Fleet Air Arm chronology records the 10th Naval Fighter Wing as operating from October 1944 to February 1945 and identifies Major P.P. Nelson-Gracie, RM, as its Wing Leader.

=== Deployment ===
Both squadrons moved to RNAS Ayr, South Ayrshire, Scotland, on 23 October 1944 for bombardment-spotting training. 1845 Squadron returned to RNAS Eglinton on 6 November, while 1843 Squadron remained at RNAS Ayr until returning to RNAS Eglinton on 15 December.

1845 Squadron embarked its new Vought Corsair Mk IV aircraft in HMS Slinger on 19 December 1944 and began deck-landing practice and exercises on the escort carrier in preparation for deployment to the British Pacific Fleet. 1843 Squadron completed its preparations for HMS Arbiter and flew from RNAS Belfast, County Antrim, Norther Ireland, to embark in the carrier on 14 February 1945.

=== End of the wing ===
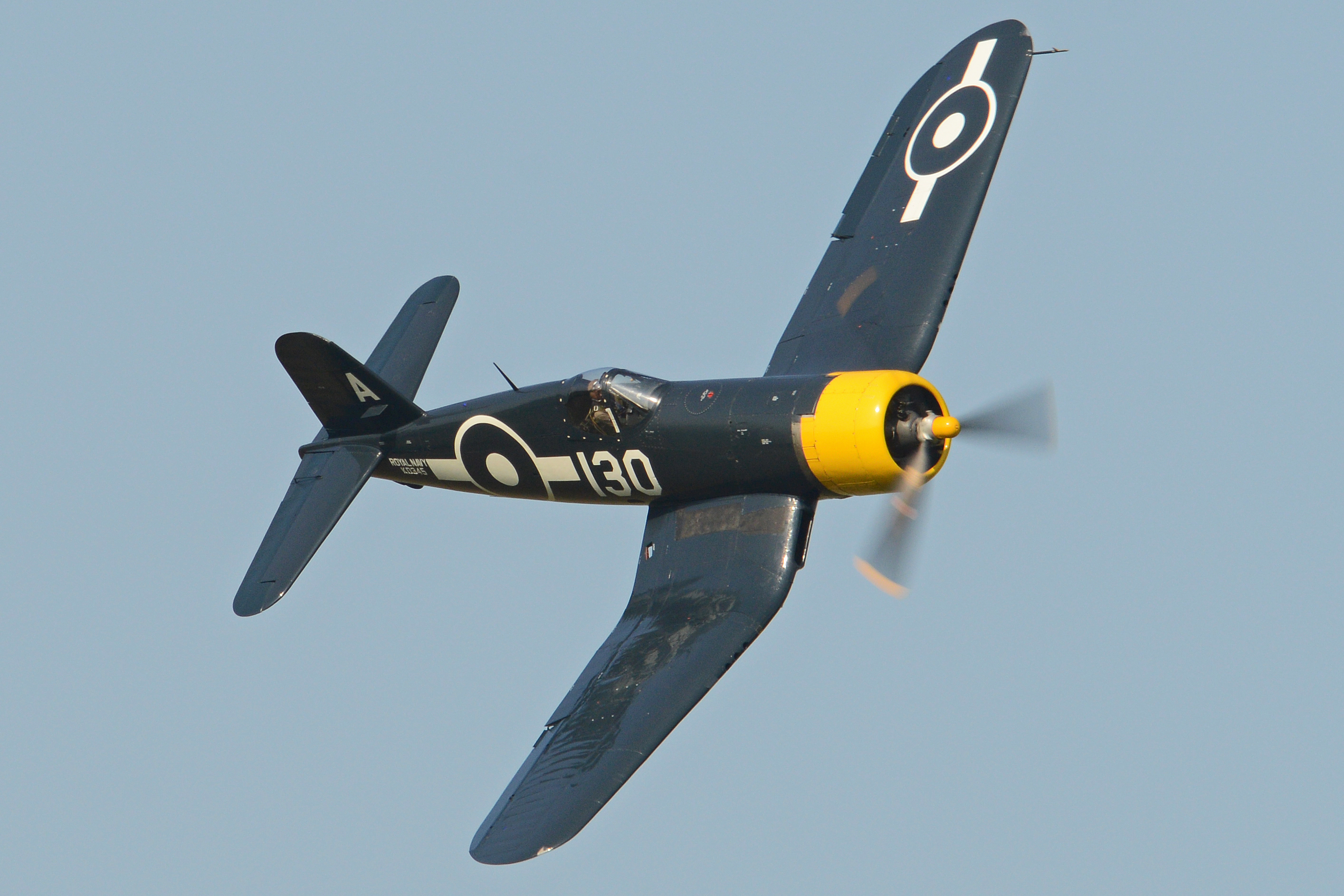
Corsair Mk IV; of the type used by 1843 and 1845 Squadrons

The Fleet Air Arm chronology records the 10th Naval Fighter Wing as existing from October 1944 until February 1945. Historic England records the two squadrons as being attached separately to HMS Arbiter and HMS Slinger.

1843 Squadron embarked in HMS Arbiter on 14 February 1945. Major Nelson-Gracie's command of 1843 Squadron ended on 11 February 1945, when Lieutenant Commander P.C.S. Chilton, RN, succeeded him as commanding officer.

1845 Squadron continued its separate service aboard HMS Slinger after February 1945. On 25 February its serviceable aircraft were flown off to RNAS Schofields (HMS Nabthorpe), New South Wales, Australia, while three unserviceable airframes were taken by road to RNAS Bankstown (HMS Nabberley), Sydney. The squadron was disbanded on 5 April 1945, with its aircraft and aircrew dispersed to the Illustrious-class aircraft carriers HMS Formidable and HMS Victorious.

1843 and 1845 Naval Air Squadrons subsequently became components of the 3rd Carrier Air Group, which formed at RNAS Nowra (HMS Nabbington), New South Wales, on 2 August 1945 with 854 Naval Air Squadron.

== Squadrons ==
10th Naval Fighter Wing consited of two Fleet Air Arm squadrons:

- 1843 Naval Air Squadron, October 1944 - February 1945
- 1845 Naval Air Squadron, October 1944 - February 1945

== Naval air stations and carrier deployments ==
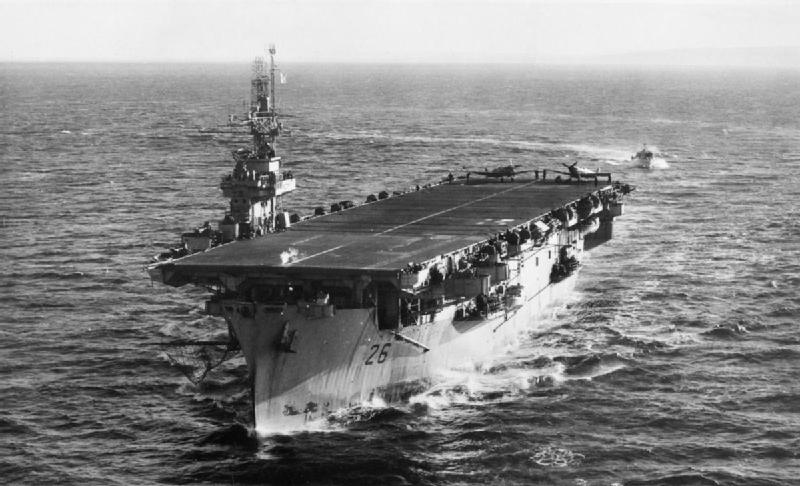
HMS Slinger

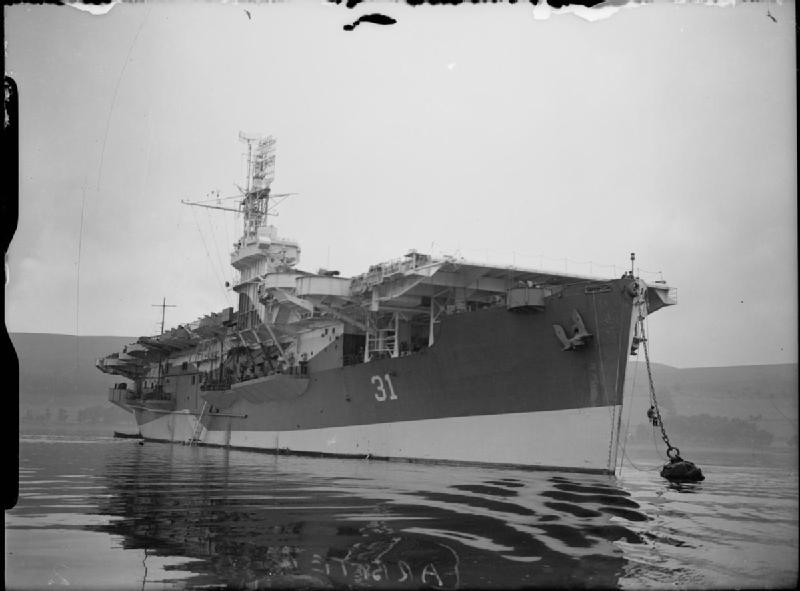
HMS Arbiter

- Royal Naval Air Station Eglinton (HMS Gannet), County Londonderry.
  - The 10th Naval Fighter Wing was formed at RNAS Eglinton on 14 October 1944, with 1843 and 1845 Naval Air Squadrons. The wing's headquarters was established at the naval air station. 1845 Squadron had arrived at RNAS Eglinton on 18 September, while 1843 Squadron had been at the station since August.
- Royal Naval Air Station Ayr (HMS Wagtail), South Ayrshire.
  - 1843 and 1845 Naval Air Squadrons moved to RNAS Ayr on 23 October 1944 for bombardment-spotting training. 1845 Squadron returned to RNAS Eglinton on 6 November, while 1843 remained at RNAS Ayr until 15 December.
- Royal Naval Air Station Eglinton (HMS Gannet), County Londonderry.
  - Following the separate training periods at RNAS Ayr, 1845 Squadron remained at RNAS Eglinton until embarking in HMS Slinger on 19 December 1944. 1843 Squadron returned to RNAS Eglinton on 15 December and remained there while preparing for its allocation to HMS Arbiter.
- HMS Slinger
  - 1845 Squadron embarked on 19 December 1944 with 24 Vought Corsair Mk IV fighter bomber aircraft and began deck landing practice and exercises with the escort carrier in preparation for deployment to the British Pacific Fleet.
- Royal Naval Air Station Belfast (HMS Gadwall), County Antrim.
  - 1843 Squadron moved to RNAS Belfast in February 1945 in preparation for embarkation in HMS Arbiter. The squadron flew from RNAS Belfast to the escort carrier on 14 February.
- HMS Arbiter
  - 1843 Squadron embarked on 14 February 1945 with 24 Vought Corsair fighter bombers and began a flying programme with the escort carrier in preparation for passage to Australia.

== Aircraft ==
Naval Air Squadrons assigned to 10 Wing flew different variants of one aircraft types:

- Vought Corsair Mk II fighter-bomber (1944 - 1945)
- Vought Corsair Mk III fighter-bomber (1944)
- Vought Corsair Mk IV fighter-bomber (1944 - 1945)

== Wing leader ==
The wing was commanded by Major P.P. Nelson-Gracie, RM, from its formation in October 1944 until its disbandment.

== See also ==
- Fleet Air Arm
- List of aircraft wings of the Royal Navy
- 1843 Naval Air Squadron
- 1845 Naval Air Squadron
- HMS Arbiter
- HMS Slinger

== Bibliography ==
- Ballance, Theo; Howard, Lee; Sturtivant, Ray (2016). The Squadrons and Units of the Fleet Air Arm. Air-Britain (Historians).
- Wragg, David (2019). The Fleet Air Arm Handbook 1939–1945. The History Press.
