= 1843 Naval Air Squadron =

Inactive Royal Navy Fleet Air Arm and Reserve Air Squadron

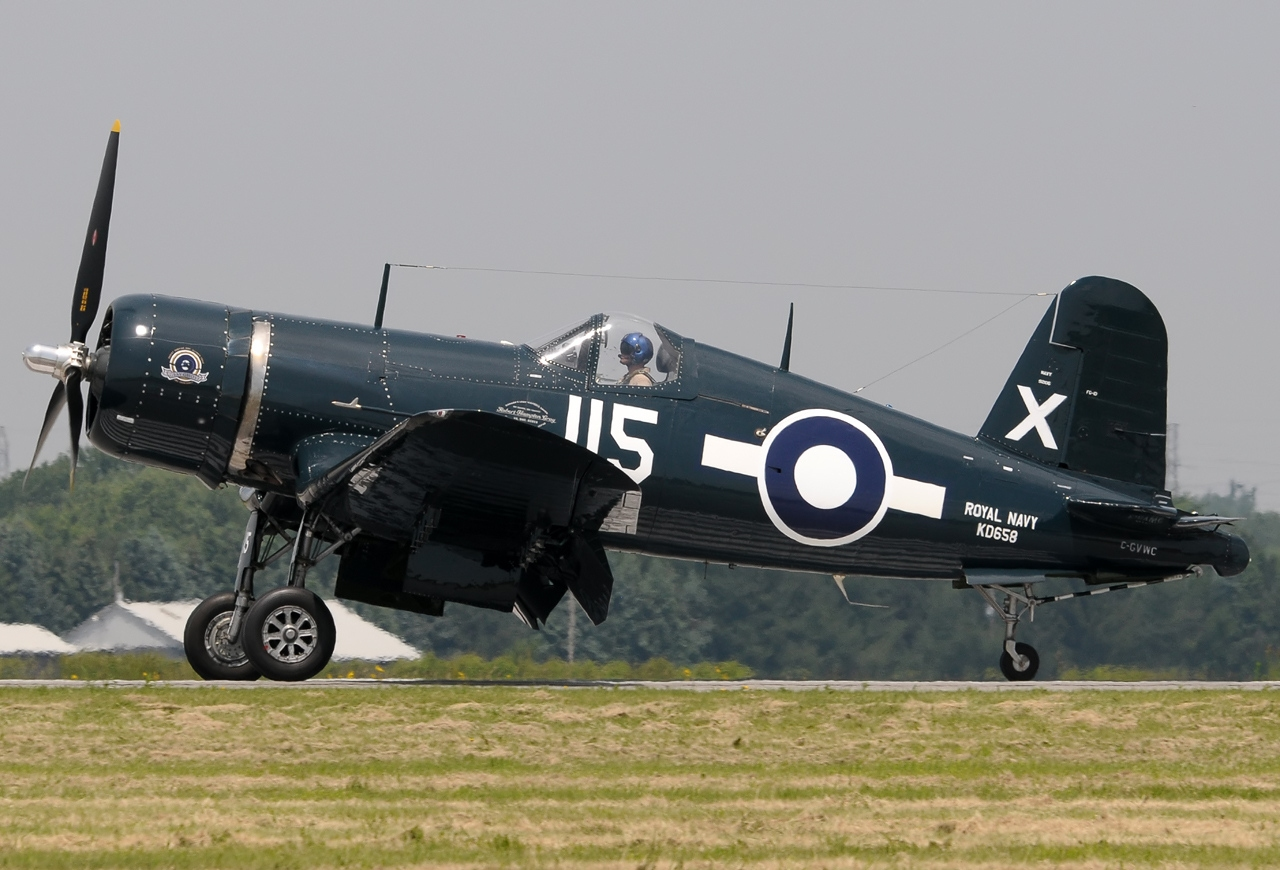
- Goodyear FG-1D Corsair Mk IV; an example of the type used by 1843 NAS
- Active: 1944–1945; 1953–1957
- Disbanded: 10 March 1957
- Country: United Kingdom
- Branch: Royal Navy
- Type: Single-seat fighter squadron; Royal Naval Volunteer Reserve Air Squadron
- Role: Fighter squadron; Anti-submarine squadron
- Size: Twenty four aircraft (1944-45); Shared aircraft pool (RNVR)
- Part of: Fleet Air Arm
- Home station: See Naval air stations section for full list.

Insignia
- Identification Markings: 1+V11; Single letters

Aircraft flown
- Fighter: Vought Corsair

1843 Naval Air Squadron (1843 NAS) was a Fleet Air Arm (FAA) naval air squadron of the United Kingdom’s Royal Navy (RN) between 1943 and 1945 and then a Royal Naval Volunteer Reserve Air Squadron from 1953 to 1957. It formed in the United States at RN Air Section Brunswick, in May 1944, as a fighter squadron. It arrived in the UK aboard HMS Trouncer in August. Based at HMS Gannet, RNAS Eglinton, Northern Ireland and training at HMS Wagtail, RNAS Ayr, Scotland, the squadron had deck landing training aboard HMS Patroller in December, before joining HMS Arbiter in February 1945, as part of the 10th Naval Fighter Wing. Sailing to Australia, the squadron became part of the 3rd Carrier Air Group, but saw no action before the war ended and disbanded in October 1945. It reformed as a Royal Naval Volunteer Reserve Air Branch anti-submarine squadron, in the Scottish Air Division, from 1953 and disbanded in 1957.

== History ==
=== Single-seat fighter squadron (1944 - 1945) ===
1843 Naval Air Squadron formed on 1 June 1944 in the United States at RN Air Section Brunswick, which was located at United States Naval Air Station (USNAS) Brunswick, Maine, as a Single Seat Fighter Squadron, under the command of Lieutenant Commander(A) D.K. Evans, RNZNVR.

It was equipped with eighteen Vought Corsair aircraft, an American carrier-borne fighter-bomber. These were the Brewster built F4U-1 variant the F3A-1 and F3A-1D, designated Corsair Mk III by the Fleet Air Arm. Training consisted air combat, low altitude and formation flying and navigation. On 3 July the squadron began Aerodrome Dummy Deck Landings (ADDLs) utilising the nearby US Naval Auxiliary Airfield at Bar Harbor, Maine.

On completion of working up in late July the Mk III Vought Corsair were replaced with the Mk II variant . This version was the Vought built F4U-1A, before embarking in HMS Trouncer for the UK in August 1944. The Ruler-class escort carrier sailed from New York City on 11 August, to cross the Atlantic as part of convoy CU.35.

The squadron disembarked to RNAS Eglinton (HMS Gannet), near Derry, Northern Ireland, on 24 August. On 20 September Lieutenant Commander(A) D.F.V. Davis, RCNVR, was given temporary command of the squadron. On 14 October a new commanding officer, Major P.P. Nelson-Gracie, RM, took command Along with 1845 Naval Air Squadron, they formed the 10th Naval Fighter Wing. The squadron flew to Scotland on 23 October to RNAS Ayr (HMS Wagtail), Ayr, and remained there until returning to RNAS Eglinton on 15 December. At the end of November the squadron strength was increased to twenty-four aircraft when it absorbed part of 1848 Naval Air Squadron which was disbanded on 21 November. A detachment of eight aircraft undertook Deck Landing Training (DLT) on the Ruler-class escort carrier, HMS Patroller between 21 and 23 December.

At the start of February 1945 the squadron received new equipment again, these were the Goodyear built FG-1D variant of the Corsair, designated as the Mk IV by the Fleet Air Arm. The squadron flew out to embark in another Ruler-class escort carrier, HMS Arbiter, on Valentine’s Day 1945. It sailed to Australia via a brief stop at Ceylon. On 2 May it disembarked to RNAS Schofields (HMS Nabthorpe), (Mobile Naval Air Base No. 3), which was situated at RAAF Station Schofields, New South Wales.

The squadron re-embarked into HMS Arbiter and sailed for the Admiralty Islands where it disembarked all twenty-four aircraft to RNAS Ponum (HMS Nabaron), (Mobile Naval Air Base No. 4) which was situated on a former US Navy airstrip on Ponam Island, Papua New Guinea, on the last day of May. It remained for almost a month, re-embarked on 25 June. The carrier returned to Australia and the squadron disembarked on 4 July to RNAS Maryborough (HMS Nabstock), (Mobile Naval Air Base No. 6), which was located at RAAF Station Maryborough, Queensland. However, the stay was limited and the squadron flew to RNAS Jervis Bay (HMS Nabswick), (Mobile Naval Air Base No. 5), situated at Jervis Bay Airfield, New South Wales, on 14 of the month.

A week later it wagon the move again, flying to RNAS Nowra (HMS Nabbington) (Mobile Naval Air base No. 1), established at the Royal Australian Air Force (RAAF) base RAAF Nowra at Nowra, New South Wales, where it joined the 3rd Carrier Air Group (3rd CAG) which formed at HMS Nabbington on 2 August as a spare Group for an Illustrious-class fleet carrier. The squadron saw no action before the war ended and the Air Group was disbanded on 20 October. The aircraft were withdrawn in September, and the squadron personnel sailed home in SS Stratheden, to disband on arrival on 10 December 1945.

== Royal Naval Volunteer Reserve Air Squadron ==
=== Anti-submarine squadron ===
On 20 April 1953 1843 Sqn reformed at RNAS Abbotsinch (HMS Sanderling), Paisley, Scotland, as a Royal Naval Volunteer Reserve Air Branch anti-submarine squadron in the Scottish Air Division, under the command of Lieutenant Commander(A) M. Ross, RNVR. It was essentially a renaming of 1830A Naval Air Squadron. The squadron shared a pool of aircraft with 1830 Naval Air Squadron. The RNVR squadron disbanded on 10 March 1957 under the White Paper defence cuts of that year.

== Aircraft flown ==
1843 Naval Air Squadron flew three variants of only one aircraft type:

- Vought Corsair Mk III fighter-bomber (May - August 1944)
- Vought Corsair Mk II fighter-bomber (July 1944 - February 1945)
- Vought Corsair Mk IV fighter-bomber (February - September 1945)

== Assignments ==
1843 Naval Air Squadron was assigned as needed to form part of a number of larger units:

- 10th Naval Fighter Wing (14 October 1944 - February 1945)
- 3rd Carrier Air Group (2 August - 31 October 1945)

== Naval air stations ==
1843 Naval Air Squadron operated from a number of naval air stations of the Royal Navy, in the United Kingdom, and overseas, and a number of Royal Navy escort carriers:

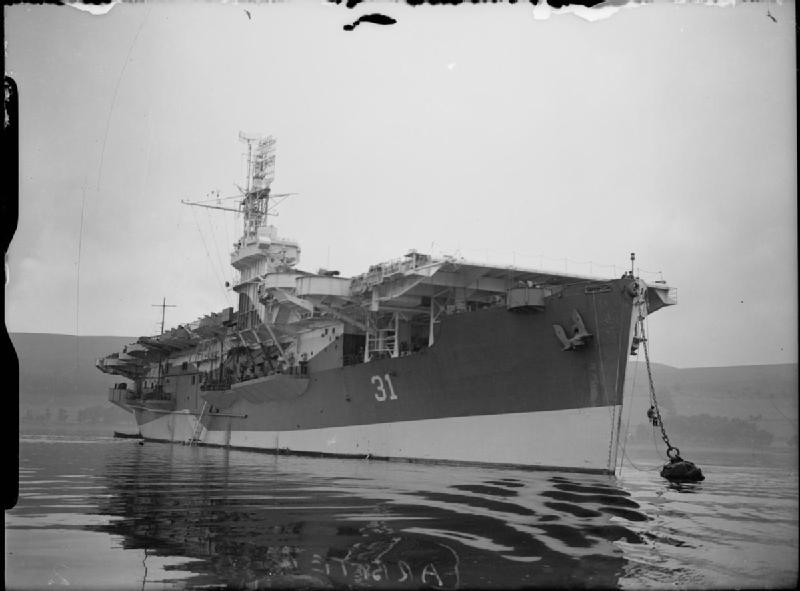
HMS Arbiter

- RN Air Section Brunswick, Maine, (1 May - 2 August 1944)
- HMS Trouncer (2 - 24 August 1944)
- Royal Naval Air Station Eglinton (HMS Gannet), County Londonderry, (24 August 1944 - 14 February 1945)
  - Royal Naval Air Station Ayr (HMS Wagtail), South Ayrshire, (Detachments 23 October - 15 December 1944)
  - Royal Air Force Acklington, Northumberland, (Detachment 11 - 17 December 1944)
  - HMS Patroller (Detachment eight aircraft Deck Landing Training (DLT) 21 - 23 December 1944)
- HMS Arbiter (14 February - 4 April 1945)
- Royal Naval Air Station Colombo Racecourse (HMS Bherunda), Ceylon, (4 - 13 April 1945)
- HMS Arbiter (13 April - 1 May 1945)
- Royal Naval Air Station Schofields (HMS Nabthorpe), New South Wales, (1 May - 4 June 1945)
- Royal Naval Air Station Maryborough (HMS Nabstock), Queensland, (4 June - 14 July 1945)
- Royal Naval Air Station Jervis Bay (HMS Nabswick), Jervis Bay Territory, (14 - 22 July 1945)
- Royal Naval Air Station Nowra (HMS Nabbington), New South Wales, (22 July - 24 October 1945)
- SS Stratheden - transit - (24 October - 10 December 1945)
- disbanded - UK (10 December 1945)

== Commanding officers ==
List of commanding officers of 1843 Naval Air Squadron with date of appointment:

1944 - 1945

- Lieutenant Commander(A) D.K. Evans, RNZNVR, from 1 May 1944
- Lieutenant Commander(A) D.F.V. Davis, RCNVR, (temp), from 20 September 1944
- Major P.P. Nelson-Gracie, RM, from 14 October 1944
- Lieutenant Commander(A) P.C.S. Chilton, RN, from 11 February 1945
- disbanded - 10 December 1945

1953 - 1957

- Lieutenant Commander(A) M. Ross, RNVR, from 20 April 1953
- disbanded - 10 March 1957

Note: Abbreviation (A) signifies Air Branch of the RN or RNVR.

== See also ==
- List of Fleet Air Arm groups
