= List of Fleet Air Arm groups =

This is a list of Fleet Air Arm groups of the Royal Navy (RN), the Royal Australian Navy (RAN) and the Royal Canadian Navy (RCN), that were either formed or planned. There were two types of groups: there were Carrier Air Groups that administered squadrons which operated on aircraft carriers, and there were Training Air Groups which administered squadrons that operated from airbases.

== Carrier air groups ==
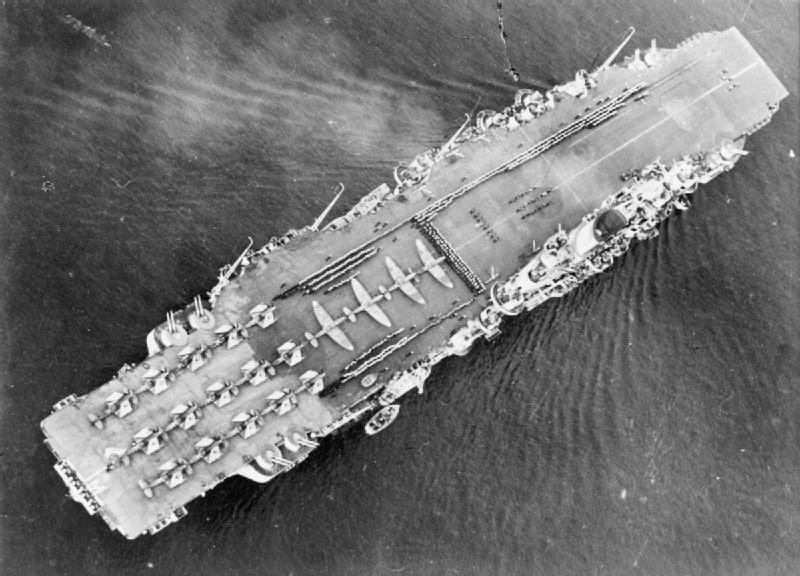
HMS Implacable of the British Pacific Fleet. The carrier's aircraft (twenty two Supermarine Seafires) line the deck whilst the ships company are stretching along it. Forward is the Ship's Scottish pipe band, the only one of its kind in the Royal Navy.

The squadrons and aircraft wings of the Fleet Air Arm, stationed on Fleet and Light Fleet aircraft carriers, were organized into Air Groups in accordance with United States Navy policy following the conclusion of World War II in Europe. This reorganisation aimed to facilitate operations in the Pacific Theater against Japan in 1945. The structure included complete spare groups for Fleet carriers and half spare groups for Light Fleet carriers.

The carrier air groups were organised according to the classification of aircraft carriers and a standardised strength model that considered the squadrons of the Fleet Air Arm and the types of aircraft. By 30 June 1945, nine out of the planned twenty-two groups had been established based on the squadrons that were available. Additionally, one group was created as a reserve in August 1945, while several others were either formed after World War II or reactivated at a subsequent time.

Carrier Air Groups one to six were designated for the three carriers of the Illustrious-class, with each group comprising two squadrons of Vought Corsair and one squadron of Grumman Avenger, with each squadron containing fifteen aircraft. The two ships belonging to the Implacable-class were assigned Carrier Air Groups seven to ten, with each ship featuring two squadrons of twenty-four Supermarine Seafire, one squadron of fifteen Grumman Avenger, and one squadron of fifteen Fairey Firefly. HMS Indomitable, the sole representative of her class, was allocated Carrier Air Groups eleven and twelve, each consisting of two squadrons of twenty-four Grumman Hellcat, one squadron of fifteen Grumman Avenger, and one squadron of twelve Fairey Firefly.

The first four carriers of the Colossus-class were planned to have Carrier Air Groups numbered thirteen to eighteen, with each group including a Vought Corsair squadron of twenty-one aircraft and a squadron of twelve Fairey Barracuda. The subsequent ships in the Colossus-class were assigned Carrier Air Groups nineteen to twenty-two, with number nineteen to be crewed by the Royal Canadian Navy; each of these groups would comprise one squadron of twenty-one Supermarine Seafire and one squadron of twelve Fairey Barracuda.

Allocation of Carrier Air Groups of the Royal Navy. The proposed alignment of Fleet Air Arm squadrons aboard aircraft carriers for the British Pacific Fleet
Carrier Air Group	Aircraft carrier type	Carrier	Group strength
1st Carrier Air Group	Illustrious-class fleet carrier	HMS Victorious	2 x Vought Corsair squadrons of 15 aircraft each 1 x Grumman Avenger squadron of 15 aircraft
2nd Carrier Air Group	Illustrious-class fleet carrier	HMS Formidable	2 x Vought Corsair squadrons of 15 aircraft each 1 x Grumman Avenger squadron of 15 aircraft
3rd Carrier Air Group	Illustrious-class fleet carrier	reserve group	2 x Vought Corsair squadrons of 15 aircraft each 1 x Grumman Avenger squadron of 15 aircraft
4th Carrier Air Group	Illustrious-class fleet carrier	HMS Illustrious	2 x Vought Corsair squadrons of 15 aircraft each 1 x Grumman Avenger squadron of 15 aircraft
5th Carrier Air Group	Illustrious-class fleet carrier	spare	2 x Vought Corsair squadrons of 15 aircraft each 1 x Grumman Avenger squadron of 15 aircraft
6th Carrier Air Group	Illustrious-class fleet carrier	spare	2 x Vought Corsair squadrons of 15 aircraft each 1 x Grumman Avenger squadron of 15 aircraft
7th Carrier Air Group	Implacable-class fleet carrier	HMS Indefatigable	2 x Supermarine Seafire squadrons of 24 aircraft each 1 x Grumman Avenger squadron of 15 aircraft 1 x Fairey Firefly of 15 aircraft
8th Carrier Air Group	Implacable-class fleet carrier	HMS Implacable	2 x Supermarine Seafire squadrons of 24 aircraft each 1 x Grumman Avenger squadron of 15 aircraft 1 x Fairey Firefly squadron of 15 aircraft
9th Carrier Air Group	Implacable-class fleet carrier	spare	2 x Supermarine Seafire squadrons of 24 aircraft each 1 x Grumman Avenger squadron of 15 aircraft 1 x Fairey Firefly squadron of 15 aircraft
10th Carrier Air Group	Implacable-class fleet carrier	spare	2 x Supermarine Seafire squadrons of 24 aircraft each 1 x Grumman Avenger squadron of 15 aircraft 1 x Fairey Firefly squadron of 15 aircraft
11th Carrier Air Group	modified Illustrious-class aircraft carrier	HMS Indomitable	2 x Grumman Hellcat squadrons of 24 aircraft each 1 x Grumman Avenger squadron of 15 aircraft 1 x Fairey Firefly squadron of 12 aircraft
12th Carrier Air Group	modified Illustrious-class aircraft carrier	spare	2 x Grumman Hellcat squadrons of 24 aircraft each 1 x Grumman Avenger squadron of 15 aircraft 1 x Fairey Firefly squadron of 12 aircraft
13th Carrier Air Group	Colossus-class light fleet carrier	HMS Vengeance	1 x Vought Corsair squadron of 21 aircraft 1 x Fairey Barracuda squadron of 12 aircraft
14th Carrier Air Group	Colossus-class light fleet carrier	HMS Colossus	1 x Vought Corsair squadron of 21 aircraft 1 x Fairey Barracuda squadron of 12 aircraft
15th Carrier Air Group	Colossus-class light fleet carrier	HMS Venerable	1 x Vought Corsair squadron of 21 aircraft 1 x Fairey Barracuda squadron of 12 aircraft
16th Carrier Air Group	Colossus-class light fleet carrier	HMS Glory	1 x Vought Corsair squadron of 21 aircraft 1 x Fairey Barracuda squadron of 12 aircraft
17th Carrier Air Group	Colossus-class light fleet carrier	spare	1 x Vought Corsair squadron of 21 aircraft 1 x Fairey Barracuda squadron of 12 aircraft
18th Carrier Air Group	Colossus-class light fleet carrier	spare	1 x Vought Corsair squadron of 21 aircraft 1 x Fairey Barracuda squadron of 12 aircraft
19th Carrier Air Group	Colossus-class light fleet carrier	not allocated (Royal Canadian Navy)	1 x Supermarine Seafire squadron of 21 aircraft 1 x Fairey Barracuda squadron of 12 aircraft
20th Carrier Air Group	Colossus-class light fleet carrier	not allocated	1 x Supermarine Seafire squadron of 21 aircraft 1 x Fairey Barracuda squadron of 12 aircraft
21st Carrier Air Group	Colossus-class light fleet carrier	not allocated	1 x Supermarine Seafire squadron of 21 aircraft 1 x Fairey Barracuda squadron of 12 aircraft
22nd Carrier Air Group	Colossus-class light fleet carrier	not allocated	1 x Supermarine Seafire squadron of 21 aircraft 1 x Fairey Barracuda squadron of 12 aircraft

=== Royal Navy ===
==== World War II - 1945 ====
The table below shows the nine carrier air groups created and allocated to an aircraft carrier during the latter part of World War II and the subsequent reserve carrier air group:

World War II Carrier Air Groups of the Royal Navy. Nine out of the twenty-two planned groups were established during World War II. An additional reserve group was created in August 1945.
Carrier Air Group		Summary	Notes
1st Carrier Air Group	1st CAG	Formed on 30 June 1945. It was for the aircraft carrier HMS Victorious for service in the British Pacific Fleet and comprised 849 Naval Air Squadron flying Grumman Avenger torpedo bombers, 1834 Naval Air Squadron and 1836 Naval Air Squadron flying Vought Corsair fighter aircraft. It was disbanded on 8 September 1945 when HMS Victorious returned to the United Kingdom.	
2nd Carrier Air Group	2nd CAG	Formed on 30 June 1945. It was for the aircraft carrier HMS Formidable for service in the British Pacific Fleet and contained 848 Naval Air Squadron flying Grumman Avenger, 1841 Naval Air Squadron and 1842 Naval Air Squadron flying Vought Corsair. It was disbanded on 31 October 1945 when HMS Formidable returned to the United Kingdom.	
3rd Carrier Air Group	3rd CAG	Formed on 2 August 1945. It was a reserve air group for the British Pacific Fleet based at HMS Nabbington. It was formed too late for service in the war, and it contained 854 Naval Air Squadron flying Grumman Avenger with 1843 Naval Air Squadron and 1845 Naval Air Squadron flying Vought Corsair. It was disbanded on 20 October 1945, and its personnel returned to the United Kingdom onboard a merchant ship.	
7th Carrier Air Group	7th CAG	Formed on 30 June 1945. It was for the aircraft carrier HMS Indefatigable for service in the British Pacific Fleet and contained 820 Naval Air Squadron flying Grumman Avenger, 887 Naval Air Squadron and 894 Naval Air Squadron flying Supermarine Seafire and 1770 Naval Air Squadron flying Fairey Firefly. It was disbanded in March 1946.	
8th Carrier Air Group	8th CAG	Formed on 30 June 1945. It was for the aircraft carrier HMS Implacable for service in the British Pacific Fleet and contained 828 Naval Air Squadron flying Grumman Avenger, along with 801 Naval Air Squadron and 880 Naval Air Squadron flying Supermarine Seafire and 1771 Naval Air Squadron flying Fairey Firefly. It was disbanded in April 1946, but some of its squadrons disbanded earlier.	
11th Carrier Air Group	11th CAG	Formed on 30 June 1945. It was for the aircraft carrier HMS Indomitable for service in the British Pacific Fleet and contained 857 Naval Air Squadron flying Grumman Avenger, 1839 Naval Air Squadron and 1844 Naval Air Squadron flying Grumman Hellcat. It was disbanded on 30 November 1945.	
13th Carrier Air Group	13th CAG	Formed on 30 June 1945. It was for the aircraft carrier HMS Vengeance for service in the British Pacific Fleet and contained 812 Naval Air Squadron flying the Fairey Barracuda and 1850 Naval Air Squadron flying Vought Corsair. It was disbanded in August 1946.	
14th Carrier Air Group	14th CAG	Formed on 30 June 1945. It was for the aircraft carrier HMS Colossus for service in the British Pacific Fleet and contained 827 Naval Air Squadron flying Fairey Barracuda and 1846 Naval Air Squadron flying Vought Corsair. It was disbanded on 23 July 1946.	
15th Carrier Air Group	15th CAG	Formed on 30 June 1945. It was for the aircraft carrier HMS Venerable for service in the British Pacific Fleet and contained 814 Naval Air Squadron flying Fairey Barracuda and 1851 Naval Air Squadron flying Vought Corsair. It was disbanded in 1947.	
16th Carrier Air Group	16th CAG	Formed on 30 June 1945. It was for the aircraft carrier HMS Glory for service in the British Pacific Fleet and contained 837 Naval Air Squadron flying Fairey Barracuda and 1831 Naval Air Squadron flying Vought Corsair. It was disbanded in 1947.	

During World War II the creation of a 4th, 5th, 6th, 9th, 10th, 12th and 22nd Carrier Air Group also was planned. The surrender of Japan rendered these new carrier air groups unnecessary, and they were never formed. However, the 17th, 18th, 19th, 20th and 21st were formed post-war, with 18 and 19 allocated to the Royal Canadian Navy, and 21 a Royal Australian Navy Air Group

==== Post World War II ====
The table below shows the two carrier air groups initially intended for a Colossus-class aircraft carrier during World War II but instead subsequently formed post-war for the Royal Navy:

Post-World War II Carrier Air Groups of the Royal Navy. Two planned groups were established after World War II.
Carrier Air Group		Summary	Notes
17th Carrier Air Group	17th CAG	Was intended to be formed for a Colossus-class aircraft carrier, with 824 Naval Air Squadron operating Fairey Barracuda aircraft and 1835 Naval Air Squadron equipped with Vought Corsair aircraft. The formation never happened following V-J Day. Instead it was active three times, 1947 to 1949, 1949 to 1950 and in 1952. Initially at the shore base RNAS Eglinton (HMS Gannet) for HMS Theseus, then solely Theseus, formed of Hawker Sea Fury aircraft with 807 Naval Air Squadron and Fairey Firefly aircraft with 810 Naval Air Squadron. Third time at RNAS Hal Far (HMS Falcon) for HMS Ocean, formed of Hawker Sea Fury aircraft with 802 Naval Air Squadron and Fairey Firefly aircraft with 825 Naval Air Squadron.	
20th Carrier Air Group	20th CAG	Was intended to be formed for a Colossus-class aircraft carrier, with 816 Naval Air Squadron operating Fairey Barracuda aircraft and 805 Naval Air Squadron equipped with Supermarine Seafire aircraft. However, it eventually formed at RNAS Lee-on-Solent (HMS Daedalus), in March 1946, for HMS Ocean. At this point 816 Naval Air Squadron had swapped its Fairey Barracuda for Fairey Firefly aircraft. After operating in the Mediterranean, the group disbanded upon returning to RNAS Lee-on Solent, in July 1948. It reformed the same year as a Royal Australian Navy Air Group for HMAS Sydney.	

=== Royal Canadian Navy ===
The table below shows the two carrier air groups initially intended for a Colossus-class aircraft carrier during World War II but instead subsequently formed post-war for the Royal Canadian Navy and were later re-numbered:

Carrier Air Groups of the Royal Canadian Navy. Two planned groups were established after World War II. The two groups and their assigned squadrons were re-numbered in 1951.
Carrier Air Group		Summary	Notes
18th Carrier Air Group	18th CAG	Was intended to be formed for a Colossus-class aircraft carrier, with 822 Naval Air Squadron operating Fairey Barracuda aircraft and 1852 Naval Air Squadron equipped with Vought Corsair aircraft. This never happened due to the end of the war with Japan. It was reallocated to the Royal Canadian Navy, and formed at RCN Dartmouth on the 15 May 1947.	
19th Carrier Air Group	19th CAG	Was initially allocated to the Royal Canadian Navy and was formed at RCN Dartmouth in May 1947. It was made up of 803 Naval Air Squadron, operating Supermarine Seafire, and 825 Naval Air Squadron which was equipped with Fairey Firefly.	
30th Carrier Air Group	30th CAG	The 30th Carrier Air Group was established within the Royal Canadian Navy on 1 May 1951, through the renumbering of the 18th Carrier Air Group. This group included the re-designated 871 Naval Air Squadron, which had previously been known as 883 and was equipped with Hawker Sea Fury aircraft, as well as the 881 Naval Air Squadron, formerly designated as 826, which operated Grumman Avengers. Both squadrons were intended for deployment on the Majestic-class light aircraft carrier, HMCS Magnificent. However, the organisational structure was disbanded in May 1954, leading to the dissolution of the 30th Carrier Air Group.	
31st Support Air Group	31st SAG	The 31st Support Air Group was established within the Royal Canadian Navy on 1 May 1951, through the renumbering of the 19th Carrier Air Group. The squadrons were similarly renumbered, resulting in the formation of 870 Naval Air Squadron (formerly 803), which was equipped with Hawker Sea Fury aircraft, and 880 Naval Air Squadron (previously 825), which operated Grumman Avengers, both serving aboard HMCS Magnificent. The group was disbanded in May 1954 following the Royal Canadian Navy's decision to eliminate its Air Group system. ||	

=== Royal Australian Navy ===
The table below shows the two carrier air groups initially intended for a Colossus-class aircraft carrier during World War II but instead subsequently formed post-war within the Royal Australian Navy (RAN) for the Majestic-class light aircraft carrier, HMAS Sydney, along with a subsequent Carrier Air Group which was created for the sister ship, HMAS Melbourne:

Carrier Air Groups of the Royal Australian Navy. Two planned groups were established after World War II. An additional group was created in 1957 for HMAS Melbourne.
Carrier Air Group		Summary	Notes
20th Carrier Air Group	20th CAG	Initially a Royal Navy group for a Colossus-class aircraft carrier, it reformed on the 28 August 1948 at RNAS Eglinton (HMS Gannet), County Londonderry, with 805 Squadron (Supermarine Seafire) and 816 Squadron (Fairey Firefly), as a Royal Australian Navy Carrier Air Group, the Majestic-class light aircraft carrier, HMAS Sydney. In June 1951, the group disbanded at HMAS Albatross, Nowra.	
21st Carrier Air Group	21st CAG	Was intended to be formed for a Colossus-class aircraft carrier, with 817 Naval Air Squadron operating Fairey Barracuda aircraft and 806 Naval Air Squadron equipped with Supermarine Seafire, in 1946. It eventually formed at RNAS St Merryn (HMS Vulture), Cornwall, as a Royal Australian Navy Carrier Air Group in March 1950, made up of 808 Squadron equipped with Hawker Sea Fury aircraft and 817 Squadron, operating with Fairey Firefly aircraft, for HMAS Sydney. It disbanded in 1952.	
HMAS Melbourne Air Group	MAG	Established at HMAS Albatross in Nowra in August 1957, the formation included 808, 816, and 817 Squadrons. However, 808 Squadron was disbanded in December 1958 and subsequently replaced by 805 Squadron. The commanding officer of the senior squadron served as the air group commander until October 1966, and then resumed this role in January 1979. The air group was disbanded in November 1981, coinciding with the scheduled decommissioning of the Majestic-class light aircraft carrier, HMAS Melbourne.	

=== Not formed ===
The table below shows the seven carrier air groups initially intended for the Royal Navy during the latter part of World War II but never formed due to the Japanese surrender:

Carrier Air Groups of the Royal Navy. With the end of the Pacific War there was no requirement for 4, 5, 6, 9, 10, 12 & 22 CAGs
Carrier Air Group		Summary	Notes
4th Carrier Air Group	4th CAG	Was planned to be formed for the aircraft carrier HMS Illustrious for service in the British Pacific Fleet. It was to comprise 846 Naval Air Squadron operating Grumman Avenger, 1837 Naval Air Squadron and 1853 Naval Air Squadron equipped with Vought Corsair. The plan to form was cancelled following the Japanese surrender.	
5th Carrier Air Group	5th CAG	Was planned to be formed as a spare group for an Illustrious-class aircraft carrier. It was to be made up of 852 Naval Air Squadron operating Grumman Avenger, 1832 Naval Air Squadron and 1838 Naval Air Squadron equipped with Vought Corsair. The plan to form was cancelled following V-J Day.	
6th Carrier Air Group	6th CAG	Was planned to be formed as a spare group for an Illustrious-class aircraft carrier. It was to consist of 853 Naval Air Squadron operating Grumman Avenger, 882 Naval Air Squadron and 1830 Naval Air Squadron equipped with Vought Corsair. Planned to depart the United Kingdom in January 1946, when 882 Naval Air Squadron re-equipped from Grumman Wildcat aircraft. The plan to form was cancelled following V-J Day.	
9th Carrier Air Group	9th CAG	Was planned to be formed as a spare group for an Implacable-class aircraft carrier. It was to consist of 802 Naval Air Squadron and 899 Naval Air Squadron equipped with Supermarine Seafire, 851 Naval Air Squadron with Grumman Avenger and a planned 1773 Naval Air Squadron with Fairey Firefly. The formation was cancelled following V-J Day.	
10th Carrier Air Group	10th CAG	Was planned to be formed as a spare group for an Implacable-class aircraft carrier. It was to be made up of 883 Naval Air Squadron and 1833 Naval Air Squadron equipped with Supermarine Seafire, 856 Naval Air Squadron with Grumman Avenger and a planned 1775 Naval Air Squadron with Fairey Firefly. The plan was cancelled following V-J Day.	
12th Carrier Air Group	12th CAG	Was planned to be formed as a spare group for the aircraft carrier HMS Indomitable. It was to contain 845 Naval Air Squadron with Grumman Avenger aircraft, 881 Naval Air Squadron and 885 Naval Air Squadron with Grumman Hellcat aircraft and a planned 1774 Naval Air Squadron with Fairey Firefly aircraft. This was cancelled following V-J Day.	
22nd Carrier Air Group	22nd CAG	Was planned to be formed in service for a Colossus-class aircraft carrier. It was to be formed of 818 Naval Air Squadron operating Fairey Barracuda aircraft and 884 Naval Air Squadron equipped with Supermarine Seafire aircraft. The formation never happened following V-J Day.	

== Training air groups ==
Between 1947 and 1954, several training air groups were established to oversee some of the second line Fleet Air Arm squadrons in both the Royal Navy and the Royal Canadian Navy.

=== Royal Navy (1948-1952) ===
The table below shows the Fleet Air Arm training and miscellaneous air groups created after World War II for the Royal Navy:

Training Air Groups of the Royal Navy.
Training Air Group		Summary	Notes
50th Training Air Group	50th TrAG	Formed at RNAS Yeovilton (HMS Heron), Somerset, on 13 May 1948, to oversee second-line units stationed locally. Initially, this included 700 Naval Air Squadron, which was already present, and 799 Naval Air Squadron, which arrived at that time. 700 Naval Air Squadron was disbanded in August 1949, and 767 Naval Air Squadron took its place in September. In December 1951, 799 Naval Air Squadron relocated to RNAS Machrihanish (HMS Landrail), Argyll and Bute in Scotland, and 767 Naval Air Squadron followed suit, moving to RNAS Henstridge (HMS Dipper), Somerset, in January 1952, leading to the dissolution of the group.	
51st Training Air Group; 51st Miscellaneous Air Group	51st TrAG; 51st MAG	The 51st TrAG formed at RNAS Eglinton (HMS Gannet), Country Londonderry, Northern Ireland, during May 1946. Administered second line units at RNAS Eglinton such as 718 Naval Air Squadron and 719 Naval Air Squadron. It was disbanded on 13 November 1946. The number was used again in July 1948, when the 51st Miscellaneous Air Group (MAG) formed at RNAS Lee-on-Solent (HMS Daedalus) during July 1948. Administered 771 Naval Air Squadron and 783 Naval Air Squadron at RNAS Lee-on-Solent. Disbanded during 1950.	
52nd Training Air Group	52nd TrAG	The 52nd Training Air Group was established at RNAS Eglinton (HMS Gannet) on 1 August 1946, to oversee the operations of 718 and 719 Naval Air Squadrons, within the framework of the Naval Air Fighter School. On 13 November, the Group assumed control of 794 and 795 Naval Air Squadrons, which were transferred from the disbanding 51st TrAG. Following several months of deployment aboard HMS Implacable, both the squadrons and the Group were disbanded in March 1947. The 52nd TrAG was re-established at RNAS Culdrose (HMS Seahawk), Cornwall, on 1 February 1950, as part of the Naval Air Fighter School, incorporating 759 and 736 Naval Air Squadrons. Subsequently, in May 1950, 736 Naval Air Squadron was divided to create 738 Naval Air Squadron. The designation of 52nd TrAG was discontinued in August 1951.	
53rd Training Air Group	53rd TrAG	The 53rd TrAG was established at RNAS Eglinton (HMS Gannet) on 14 June 1950, administering 719 and 737 Naval Air Squadrons as a component of the Naval Air Anti-Submarine School. Nevertheless, its existence was brief, as it was disbanded on 31 January 1952.	

=== Royal Canadian Navy (1947-1954) ===
The table below shows the Fleet Air Arm training air groups created after World War II for the Royal Canadian Navy:

Training Air Groups of the Royal Canadian Navy.
Training Air Group		Summary	Notes
1st Training Air Group	1 TrAG	Established by the Royal Canadian Navy at Royal Canadian Naval Air Station Shearwater (RCNAS Shearwater) on 1 May 1947, the unit included 743 Fleet Requirements Unit (FRU) and an unnumbered Operational Training Unit (OTU). Functioning as a squadron headquarters, it operated with 743 and the OTU organised as Flights. In addition to the FRU, the primary mission of the Training Air Group (TrAG) was to train aircrew for the 18th and 19th Carrier Air Groups (CAGs). In November 1952, 743 was re-designated as VU 32, while the OTU was renamed VT 40. 1 TrAG was disbanded on 2 May 1954, following the RCN's decision to discontinue the Air Group system.	

== See also ==
=== Lists of Royal Navy aircraft groupings ===
- List of Fleet Air Arm aircraft squadrons
- List of aircraft wings of the Royal Navy
- List of aircraft units of the Royal Navy

=== Lists of Royal Navy fixed wing aircraft capable ships ===
- List of aircraft carriers of the Royal Navy
- List of escort carriers of the Royal Navy

=== Lists of Royal Navy aircraft capable shore establishments ===
- List of air stations of the Royal Navy
