= 1845 Naval Air Squadron =

Inactive flying squadron of the Royal Navy's Fleet Air Arm

- Squadron badge
- Active: 1944–1945
- Disbanded: 24 October 1945
- Country: United Kingdom
- Branch: Royal Navy
- Type: Single-seat fighter squadron
- Role: Fighter squadron
- Size: Twenty-four aircraft
- Part of: Fleet Air Arm
- Home station: See Naval air stations section for full list.
- Mottos: Pluribus optimum (Latin for 'The best out of many')
- Engagements: World War II: Pacific War; Operation Iceberg
- Battle honours: Okinawa 1945

Insignia
- Squadron Badge Description: Blue, in base wavy of five white and blue two eagles volant. Unofficial, 1944
- Identification Markings: 1+V7; 7A+ (December 1944); 139+

Aircraft flown
- Fighter: Vought Corsair

1845 Naval Air Squadron (1845 NAS) was a Fleet Air Arm (FAA) naval air squadron of the United Kingdom's Royal Navy (RN). It formed at RN Air Section Brunswick, United States, in June 1944 as a fighter squadron, with eighteen Vought Corsair Mk III fighter aircraft. It embarked in HMS Puncher on 30 August, disembarking to HMS Gannet, RNAS Eglinton, Northern Ireland, on 18 September and joining the 10th Naval Fighter Wing. It re-equipped with twenty-four Vought Corsair Mk IV, and embarked HMS Slinger in December, sailing for the British Pacific Fleet, the squadron was disbanded in April 1945, and its aircraft and personnel absorbed into squadrons aboard the aircraft carriers HMS Formidable and HMS Victorious. On 1 June it reformed in Australia as a single seater fighter squadron at HMS Nabsford, RNAMY Archerfield, Queensland, and it shortly later became a spare squadron in the 3rd Carrier Air Group at HMS Nabbington, RNAS Nowra, New South Wales. With the end of the Second World War the squadron disbanded on 24 October.

== History ==
=== Single-seat fighter squadron (1944 - 1945) ===
1845 Naval Air Squadron formed on 1 June 1944 in the United States at RN Air Section Brunswick, which was located at United States Naval Air Station (USNAS) Brunswick, Maine, as a Single Seat Fighter Squadron, under the command of Lieutenant Commander(A) D.G. Parker, RNVR.

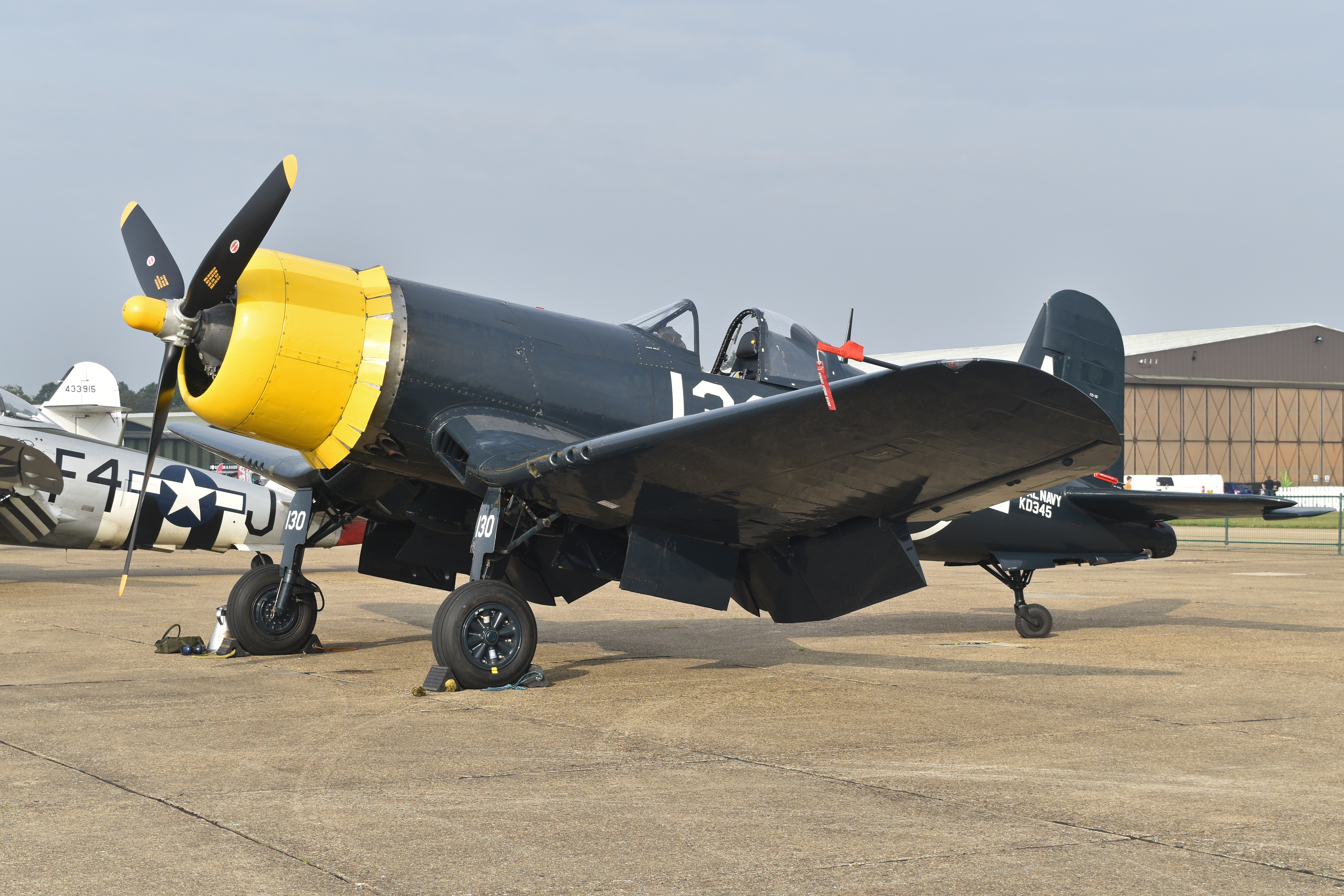
A Fleet Air Arm Goodyear FG-1D Corsair

It was equipped with eighteen Vought Corsair aircraft, an American carrier-borne fighter-bomber. These were the Brewster built F4U-1 variant the F3A-1 and F3A-1D, designated Corsair Mk III by the Fleet Air Arm. Training consisted air combat, low altitude and formation flying and navigation. On 3 July the squadron began Aerodrome Dummy Deck Landings (ADDLs) utilising the nearby US Naval Auxiliary Airfield at Bar Harbor, Maine.

On completion of working up in late August, the squadron prepared to embark in the Ruler-class escort carrier, HMS Puncher for passage to the United Kingdom. With the squadron on board, the escort carrier sailed for New York City arriving on 1 September and then joined with the United Kingdom bound Convoy CU.38 for the Atlantic crossing, with the squadron disembarking to Royal Naval Air Maintenance Yard Belfast (HMS Gadwall) on 18 of the month, before moving to RNAS Eglinton (HMS Gannet), where along with 1843 Naval Air Squadron, the squadron formed the 10th Naval Fighter Wing.

On 23 the squadron flew to RNAS Ayr (HMS Wagtail), it returned to RNAS Eglinton on 6 November and its strength was increased to twenty-four aircraft and these were the Goodyear built FG-1D variant, designated Corsair Mk IV by the Fleet Air Arm. The squadron embarked in HMS Slinger, a Ruler-class escort carrier, on 19 December to begin working up and the escort carrier sailed for the Far East to join the British Pacific Fleet.

Upon arriving at Australia, the squadron disembarked and spent a couple of weeks at RNAS Schofields (HMS Nabthorpe), (Mobile Naval Air Base No. 3), which was situated at RAAF Station Schofields, New South Wales, around the end of February to the beginning of March 1945, before reembarking in HMS Slinger.

HMS Slinger was tasked with replenishing elements of the British Pacific Fleet, Task Force 57, when it prepared for Operation Iceberg, the initial invasion of Okinawa, as demand for replacement Vought Corsair aircraft and aircrew was high. However, this impacted on 1845 Naval Air Squadron and it was therefore disbanded on 5 April, with its aircraft and personnel absorbed into the Fleet Air Arm squadrons aboard the Illustrious-class aircraft carriers, HMS Formidable and HMS Victorious.

=== Single-seat fighter squadron (1945) ===
1845 Naval Air Squadron reformed on 1 June 1945 in Australia at Royal Naval Aircraft Maintenance Yard Archerfield (HMS Nabsford) (Transportable Aircraft Maintenance Yard No.1), which was located at RAAF Station Archerfield, was a Royal Australian Air Force station at Archerfield Airport, Brisbane, Queensland, as a Single Seat Fighter Squadron, soon afterwards under the command of Lieutenant Commander(A) R.J.H. Grose RNVR.

It moved to RNAS Maryborough (HMS Nabstock) (Mobile Naval Air Base No. VI), which was situated at RAAF Maryborough, at Maryborough Airport, Maryborough, Queensland, on 23 June and was equipped with a mix of Vought Corsair Mk II and IV. The squadron moved again on 14 July, to RNAS Nowra (HMS Nabbington) (Mobile Naval Air Base No. I), which was at RAAF Nowra, New South Wales, where it formed part of the 3rd Carrier Air Group (3rd CAG) which formed at HMS Nabbington on 2 August, as a spare CAG for a Illustrious-class fleet carrier. On 19 October the aircraft were flown to RNAS Bankstown (HMS Nabberley) (Mobile Naval Air Base No. II), at RAAF Bankstown at Bankstown Airport, Sydney, New South Wales, and the squadron disbanded on 24 October at HMS Nabbington.

== Aircraft flown ==
1845 Naval Air Squadron flew different variants of only one aircraft type:

- Vought Corsair Mk III fighter bomber (June - November 1944)
- Vought Corsair Mk IV fighter bomber (November 1944 - April 1945, June - October 1945)
- Vought Corsair Mk II fighter bomber (June - October 1945)

== Battle honours ==
The battle honours awarded to 1845 Naval Air Squadron are:

- Okinawa 1945

== Assignments ==
1845 Naval Air Squadron was assigned as needed to form part of a number of larger units:

- 10th Naval Fighter Wing (14 October 1944 - February 1945)
- 3rd Carrier Air Group (2 August - 31 October 1945)

== Naval air stations ==
1845 Naval Air Squadron operated from a number of naval air stations of the Royal Navy, in the United Kingdom, and overseas, a couple of Royal Navy escort carriers:

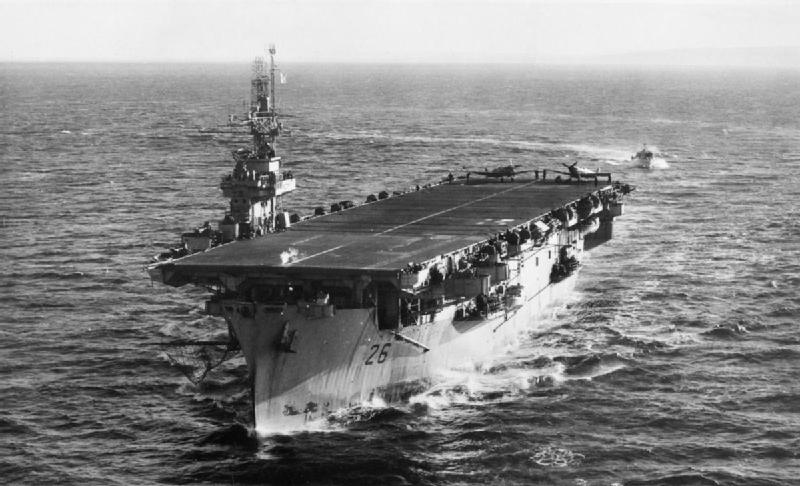
HMS Slinger

- RN Air Section Brunswick, Maine, (1 June - 30 August 1944)
- HMS Puncher (30 August - 18 September 1944)
- Royal Naval Air Station Eglinton (HMS Gannet), County Londonderry, (18 September - 23 October 1944)
- Royal Naval Air Station Ауr (HMS Wagtail), South Ayrshire, (23 October - 6 November 1944)
- Royal Naval Air Station Eglinton (HMS Gannet), County Londonderry, (6 November - 19 December 1944)
- HMS Slinger (19 December 1944 - 25 February 1945)
- Royal Naval Air Station Schofields (HMS Nabthorpe), New South Wales, (25 February - 11 March 1945)
- HMS Slinger (11 March - 5 April 1945)
- disbanded - (5 April 1945)
- Royal Naval Aircraft Maintenance Yard Archerfield (HMS Nabsford), Queensland, (1 - 23 June 1945)
- Royal Naval Air Station Maryborough (HMS Nabstock), Queensland, (23 June - 14 July 1945)
- Royal Naval Air Station Nowra (HMS Nabbington), New South Wales, (14 July - 24 October 1945)
- Royal Naval Air Station Bankstown (HMS Nabberley), New South Wales, (aircraft) (19 October 1945)
- disbanded - (24 October 1945)

== Commanding officers ==
List of commanding officers of 1845 Naval Air Squadron with date of appointment:

- Lieutenant Commander(A) D.G. Parker, RNVR, from 1 June 1944
- disbanded - 5 April 1945
- Not identified, from 1 June 1945
- Lieutenant Commander(A) R.J.H. Grose, RNVR, from 24 June 1945
- disbanded - 24 October 1945

Note: Abbreviation (A) signifies Air Branch of the RN or RNVR.

== See also ==
- List of Fleet Air Arm groups
