= 1848 Naval Air Squadron =

Inactive flying squadron of the Royal Navy's Fleet Air Arm

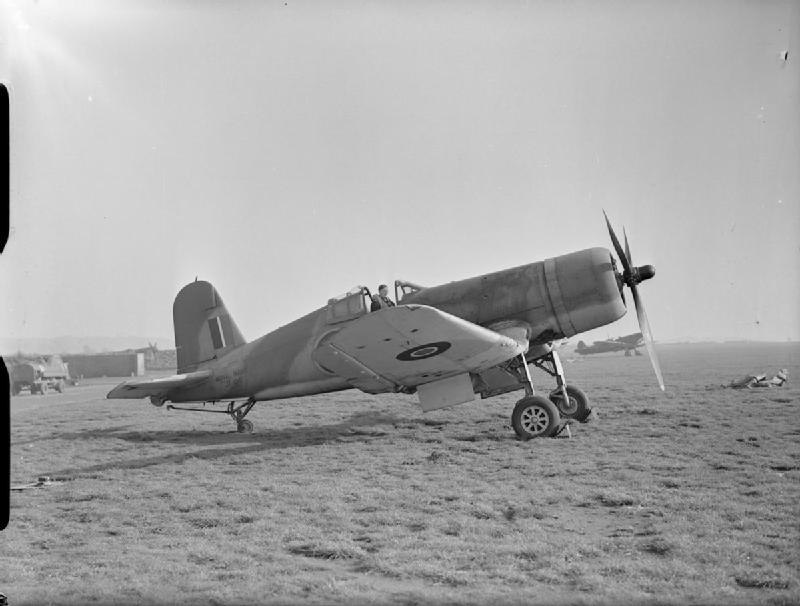
- Vought Corsair; an example of the type used by 1848 NAS
- Active: 1944
- Disbanded: 21 November 1944
- Country: United Kingdom
- Branch: Royal Navy
- Type: Single-seat fighter squadron
- Role: Fighter squadron
- Size: Eighteen aircraft
- Part of: Fleet Air Arm
- Home station: See Naval air stations section for full list.

Insignia
- Identification Markings: 1+ V9 individual letters

Aircraft flown
- Fighter: Vought Corsair

1848 Naval Air Squadron (1848 NAS) was a Fleet Air Arm (FAA) naval air squadron of the United Kingdom's Royal Navy (RN). It officially formed in the United States at RN Air Section Brunswick, in July 1944 as a fighter squadron. It was quipped with Vought Corsair fighter aircraft. The squadron embarked in HMS Ranee in October for the Atlantic crossing back to the United Kingdom. However, soon after arrival it disbanded at HMS Landrail, at RNAS Machrihanish, in November, its resources shared equally between 1843, 1845 and 1846 Naval Air Squadrons.

== History ==
=== Single-seat fighter squadron (1944) ===
1848 Naval Air Squadron formed on 1 July 1944 in the United States at RN Air Section Brunswick, which was located at United States Naval Air Station (USNAS) Brunswick, Maine, as a Single Seat Fighter Squadron, under the command of Lieutenant Commander(A) E.J. Clark, RNVR.

It was initially equipped with twelve Vought Corsair aircraft, an American carrier-borne fighter-bomber. These were made up of a mixture of the F4U-1 and F4U-1A variant, designated Corsair Mk I and II respectively, by the Fleet Air Arm. As part of the training programme, aerodrome Dummy Deck Landings (ADDLs) were undertaken at the nearby Bar Harbor Naval Auxiliary Air Facility (NAAF), Bar Harbor, Maine, from 30 July returning to RN Air Section Brunswick on 5 August.

On completion of working up the squadron strength was increased to eighteen aircraft and the squadron flew to RN Air Section Norfolk, situated USNAS Norfolk, Virginia, on 15 October, and then on 18 it embarked in the Ruler-class escort carrier, HMS Ranee, for passage to the United Kingdom. The carrier sailed for New York City on 22 October and then joined with the Liverpool bound Convoy CU.44 for the Atlantic crossing, but broke off for Belfast, Northern Ireland, with the squadron disembarking to Royal Naval Air Maintenance Yard Belfast (HMS Gadwall).

1848 Naval Air Squadron flew to Scotland, to be based at RNAS Machrihanish (HMS Landrail), Argyll and Bute, on 3 November. However, on 21 November the squadron was disbanded and its aircraft and pilots were shared equally between Nos. 1843, 1845 and 1846 Naval Air Squadrons, bringing them up to twenty four aircraft each.

== Aircraft flown ==
1848 Naval Air Squadron flew two variants of only one aircraft type:

- Vought Corsair Mk I fighter bomber (July - October 1944)
- Vought Corsair Mk II fighter bomber (July - November 1944)

== Naval air stations ==
1848 Naval Air Squadron operated from a couple of naval air stations of the Royal Navy, in the United Kingdom, and number overseas, and a Royal Navy escort carrier:

- RN Air Section Brunswick, Maine, (1 July - 15 October 1944)
- RN Air Section Norfolk, Virginia, (15 - 16 October 1944)
- HMS Ranee (16 October - 3 November 1944)
- Royal Naval Air Station Machrihanish (HMS Landrail), Argyll and Bute, (3 - 21 November 1944)
- disbanded - (21 November 1944)

== Commanding officers ==
List of commanding officers of 1848 Naval Air Squadron with date of appointment:

- Lieutenant Commander(A) E.J. Clarke, RNVR from 1 July 1944
- disbanded - 21 November 1944

Note: Abbreviation (A) signifies Air Branch of the RN or RNVR.
