= HMS Nabbington =

Mobile Operational Naval Air Base (MONAB) of the Royal Navy

HMS Nabbington Mobile Operational Naval Air Base I
- at RAAF Base Nowra, near Nowra, in New South Wales in Australia

Site information
- Type: Mobile Operational Naval Air Base
- Owner: Australian Ministry of Defence
- Operator: Royal Navy (1945–1946)
- Controlled by: Fleet Air Arm (1945–1946)
- Condition: now HMAS Albatross

Location
- Location within New South Wales HMS Nabbington (Australia)
- Coordinates: 34°56′56″S 150°32′13″E

Site history
- In use: 1945 – 1946 (Fleet Air Arm)
- Fate: MONAB decommissioned and removed
- Battles/wars: World War II; Pacific War

Garrison information
- Garrison: MONAB I
- Occupants: Flying units: 706 Pool & Refresher Flying Training Squadron; 723 Fleet Requirements Unit; Support functions: Mobile Maintenance (MM) No. 1; Maintenance Servicing (MS) No. 1; Maintenance Servicing (MS) No. 2; Mobile Repair (MR) No. 1; Maintenance, Storage & Resave (MSR) No. 1; Maintenance, Storage & Resave (MSR) No. 2; Mobile Air Torpedo Maintenance Unit (MATMU) No. 3; Mobile Air Torpedo Maintenance Unit (MATMU) No. 6; Mobile Air Torpedo Maintenance Unit (MATMU) No. 7

Airfield information
- Elevation: 365 feet (111 m) AMSL
Runways
Direction	Length and surface
03/21	2,430 yards (2,222 m) x 50 yards (46 m) sealed gravel
08/26	2,150 yards (1,966 m) x 50 yards (46 m) sealed gravel
- Source: Royal Navy Research Archive

HMS Nabbington, was a Royal Navy (RN), Mobile Operational Naval Air Base (MONAB), that was established at the Royal Australian Air Force (RAAF) base RAAF Nowra at Nowra, New South Wales, in Australia during the final stages of the Second World War. HMS Nabbington was also known as MONAB I and Royal Naval Air Station Nowra (or RNAS Nowra).

== History ==
The first Mobile Operational Naval Air Base to form, after being assembled at HMS Flycatcher, at Royal Naval Air Station Ludham, Norfolk, on 4 September 1944, the base was commissioned as an independent command bearing the ship's name HMS Nabbington on 28 October 1944, under Commander G. Nunnerley, RN. Established to support the aircraft carriers of the British Pacific Fleet, the base's stores, equipment and vehicles sailed from Victoria Dock, Birkenhead, aboard the SS Suffolk, and personnel sailed from Gladstone Dock, Liverpool upon RMS Empress of Scotland on 20 November 1944 bound for Sydney, Australia.

After arriving in Sydney on 20 December 1944, the personnel set up at Warwick Farm racecourse, which had been converted into Camp Warwick, a part of HMS Golden Hind, the Royal Navy barracks in Sydney. Upon Suffolk's arrival at Sydney on 24 December 1944, Royal Australian Air Force personnel from No. 1 Transportation & Movements began unloading the stores and equipment for transport to RAAF Nowra, which was officially transferred to the Royal Navy on a loan basis and commissioned as HMS Nabbington, Royal Naval Air Station Nowra, on 2 January 1945. Some improvements and expansion were required in order to make the base operational, and these were undertaken during January 1945. After these improvements were completed, the base provided shore based facilities for the British Pacific Fleet's Carrier Air Groups when the carriers were in Sydney for repairs and resupply.

During March and April 1945, issues with the runways at RNAS Nowra meant the temporary use of the satellite airfield at RNAS Jervis Bay in order to permit emergency repairs to be carried out on the runways and taxiways at Nowra which were deteriorating due to wet weather and heavy use. Flying operations returned to Nowra on 28 April 1945. The 3rd Carrier Air Group was formed on 2 August 1945, at HMS Nabbington, as a spare carrier air group for the British Pacific Fleet. It contained 854 Naval Air Squadron, which operated the Grumman Avenger, an American torpedo bomber aircraft, 1843 Naval Air Squadron and 1845 Naval Air Squadron, which were both equipped with the Vought Corsair, an American fighter aircraft.

When the Japanese surrendered on 15 August 1945, Victory over Japan Day (VJ Day) or Victory in the Pacific (VP Day), was celebrated at Nowra and the men and women of HMS Nabbington marched through the streets. Nabbington, MONAB I, was paid off on 15 November 1945 and RNAS Nowra was subsequently re-commissioned as HMS Nabswick (MONAB V) on 15 November 1945.

== Commanding officers ==
List of commanding officers of HMS Nabbington with date of appointment:

- Commander G.A. Nunneley, RN, from 28 October 1944
- Captain H.G. Dickinson, RN, from 9 March 1945
- Captain J.D Harvey, RN, from 1 May 1945

== Units based at HMS Nabbington ==
List of units associated with MONAB I, in support of disembarked Torpedo Bomber Reconnaissance (TBR) Squadrons, the provision of continuation & refresher flying training and a fleet requirements unit:

=== Function ===
- 706 Pool & Refresher Flying Training Squadron
- 723 Fleet Requirements Unit

=== Aviation support components ===
- Mobile Maintenance (MM) No. 1
- Mobile Servicing (MS) No. 1
- Mobile Servicing (MS) No. 2
- Mobile Repair (MR) No. 1
- Maintenance, Storage & Reserve (MSR) No. 1
- Maintenance, Storage & Reserve (MSR) No. 2
- Mobile Air Torpedo Maintenance Unit (MATMU) No. 3
- Mobile Air Torpedo Maintenance Unit (MATMU) No. 6
- Mobile Air Torpedo Maintenance Unit (MATMU) No. 7

=== Aircraft type supported ===
- Grumman Avenger Mk.I & II
- Vought Corsair Mk II & IV
- Grumman Hellcat F. Mk. I & II
- Miles Martinet TT.MK I

== Squadrons at HMS Nabbington ==
List of Fleet Air Arm first and second line squadrons, station flight and other flying units either based at or disembarked to RNAS Nowra (HMS Nabbington) and MONAB I:

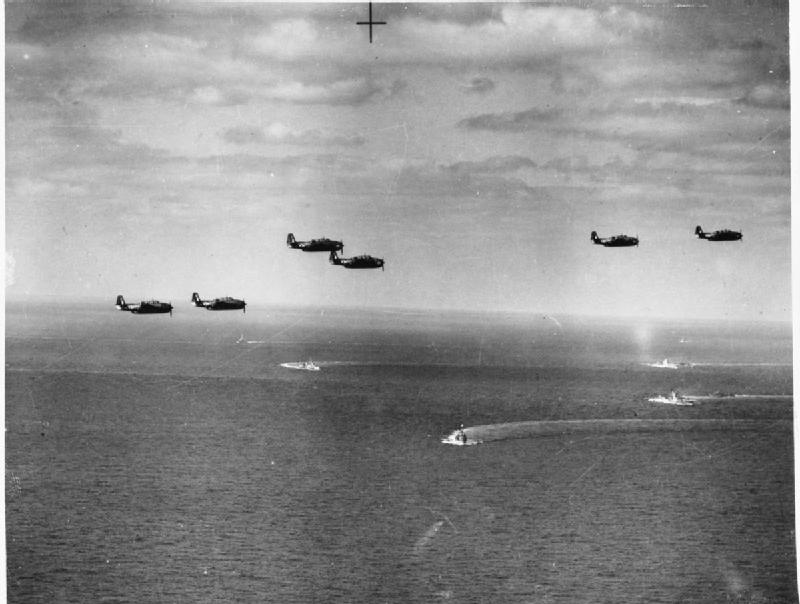
Royal Navy Fleet Air Arm Avengers

=== Based squadrons ===
- 706 Naval Air Squadron was tasked as a Pool & Refresher Flying Training Squadron. It moved here from RNAS Maryborough (HMS Nabstock) on 24 October 1945. It was equipped with two each Grumman Avenger, Fairey Barracuda, Vought Corsair, Fairey Firefly, Grumman Hellcat and Supermarine Seafire. The squadron left for RNAS Schofields (HMS Nabthorpe) on 18 January 1946.
- 723 Naval Air Squadron was assigned as a Fleet Requirements Unit. It moved here from RNAS Jervis Bay (HMS Nabswick) on 4 June 1945, equipped with Miles Martinet target tug aircraft and a number of Vought Corsair aircraft. It relocated to RNAS Schofields (HMS Nabthorpe) on 21 January 1946.

=== Disembarked squadrons ===
==== Torpedo, Bomber, Reconnaissance Squadrons ====
- 814 Naval Air Squadron, a Torpedo, Bomber, Reconnaissance Squadron, disembarked from HMS Venerable on 31 December 1945 with eighteen Fairey Barracuda Mk II. The squadron re-equipped with twelve Fairey Firefly FR.I and later flew to RNAS Schofields (HMS Nabthorpe) on 22 January 1946.
- 820 Naval Air Squadron, a Torpedo, Bomber, Reconnaissance Squadron, disembarked its Grumman Avenger Mk.II from HMS Indefatigable, on 10 February 1945, to HMS Nabbington and remained until 27. It returned on 18 September, again from HMS Indefatigable, re-embarking on 23 November.
- 828 Naval Air Squadron was a Torpedo, Bomber, Reconnaissance Squadron. It disembarked from HMS Implacable on 24 August 1945, equipped with Grumman Avenger Mk.III. It flew to RNAS Schofields (HMS Nabthorpe) on 27 November 1945.
- 837 Naval Air Squadron was a Torpedo, Bomber, Reconnaissance Squadron. It Moved here from RNAS Jervis Bay (HMS Nabswick) on 29 October 1945 equipped with eighteen Fairey Barracuda Mk II. The squadron re-equipped with twelve Fairey Firefly FR.I and embarked HMS Glory on 14 January 1946.
- 848 Naval Air Squadron was a Torpedo, Bomber, Reconnaissance Squadron which disembarked from HMS Formidable on 24 September 1945. It was equipped with Grumman Avenger Mk.I & II. The squadron personnel embarked in HMS Victorious on 25 September 1945.
- 849 Naval Air Squadron was a Torpedo, Bomber, Reconnaissance Squadron. Equipped with Grumman Avenger Mk.I & II, it was disembarked to RNAS Nowra from HMS Victorious between 10 and 27 February 1945. Later in 1945 it again disembarked from HMS Victorious, between 6 and 24 June.
- 854 Naval Air Squadron was a Torpedo, Bomber, Reconnaissance Squadron. It disembarked from HMS Illustrious on 11 February 1945, equipped Grumman Avenger Mk.I & II. It re-embarked in HMS Illustrious the following month, on 6 March. It disembarked from HMS Illustrious on 18 May. Squadron personnel embarked in SS Stratheden on 20 October.
- 857 Naval Air Squadron was a Torpedo, Bomber, Reconnaissance Squadron. It was quipped with Grumman Avenger Mk.II. A detachment of nine aircraft was disembarked from HMS Indomitable between 9 and 28 February 1945. It disembarked again from HMS Indomitable on 5 June and re-embarked on 2 August. It disembarked a third time to HMS Nabbington from HMS Indomitable, being at the airbase between 11 and 22 October 1945.

==== Fighter Squadrons ====
- 1771 Naval Air Squadron, a Two-Seat Fighter Squadron, equipped with Fairey Firefly FR.I, disembarked from HMS Implacable on 13 September 1945. It disbanded here 16 October.
- 1830 Naval Air Squadron was a Single Seat Fighter Squadron equipped with Vought Corsair Mk II. It disembarked from HMS Illustrious on 9 February 1945 and re-embarked on 7 March.
- 1831 Naval Air Squadron was a Single Seat Fighter Squadron. It was equipped with Vought Corsair Mk IV. The squadron moved here from RNAS Jervis Bay (HMS Nabswick) on 29 October 1945. It embarked HMS Glory on 19 January 1946.
- 1833 Naval Air Squadron was a Single Seat Fighter Squadron equipped with Vought Corsair Mk II. A detachment of fout aircraft from HMS Illustrious disembarked to HMS Nabbington on 9 February 1945 and re-embarked on 7 March 1945.
- 1834 Naval Air Squadron, a Single Seat Fighter Squadron with Vought Corsair Mk IV, was disembarked here from HMS Victorious between 10 and 27 February 1945.
- 1836 Naval Air Squadron, a Single Seat Fighter Squadron with Vought Corsair Mk IV, disembarked from HMS Victorious and was here between 10 and 27 February 1945.
- 1839 Naval Air Squadron was a Single Seat Fighter Squadron Equipped with Grumman Hellcat F. Mk. II & IIPR. It was disembarked here from HMS Indomitable between 10 and 27 February 1945. It disembarked again from HMS Indomitable on 4 June and re-embarked on 3 August. It disembarked a third time from HMS Indomitable on 11 October. Squadron personnel re-embarked HMS Indomitable on 22 October.
- 1841 Naval Air Squadron was a Single Seat Fighter Squadron equipped with Vought Corsair Mk IV. It disembarked from HMS Formidable on 23 August 1945 and the squadron personnel embarked in HMS Victorious on 25 September.
- 1842 Naval Air Squadron was a Single Seat Fighter Squadron which disembarked from HMS Formidable on 23 August 1945, equipped with Vought Corsair Mk IV. Personnel embarked in HMS Victorious on 25 September.
- 1843 Naval Air Squadron was a Single Seat Fighter Squadron equipped with Vought Corsair Mk IV. It moved here from RNAS Jervis Bay (HMS Nabswick) on 22 July 1945. Squadron personnel embarked on SS Stratheden 24 October 1945.
- 1844 Naval Air Squadron was a Single Seat Fighter Squadron. It was equipped with Grumman Hellcat F. Mk. II & IIPR. It was disembarked to Nowra on a number of occasions:
  - Disembarked from HMS Indomitable between 10 and 27 February 1945
  - Disembarked from HMS Indomitable on 5 June. Re-embarked HMS Indomitable on 3 August 1945.
  - Disembarked from HMS Indomitable 11 – 16 August 1945
  - Disembarked from HMS Indomitable 10 – 22 October 1945 (Squadron personnel)
- 1845 Naval Air Squadron, a Single Seat Fighter Squadron, moved here from RNAS Maryborough (HMS Nabstock) on 14 July 1945. It was equipped with Vought Corsair Mk IV. It disbanded here on 24 October 1945.
- 1846 Naval Air Squadron was a Single Seat Fighter Squadron equipped with Vought Corsair Mk IV which disembarked from HMS Colossus on 21 July 1945. It re-embarked in HMS Colossus on 13 August.
- 1851 Naval Air Squadron was a Single Seat Fighter Squadron equipped with Vought Corsair Mk IV. It disembarked from HMS Venerable on 30 December 1945. It moved to RNAS Schofields (HMS Nabthorpe) 24 January 1946.

== Aircraft carriers disembarked from/embarked to ==
List of Royal Navy aircraft carriers that Royal Navy Fleet Air Arm squadrons disembarked from, or embarked in, at HMS Nabbington:

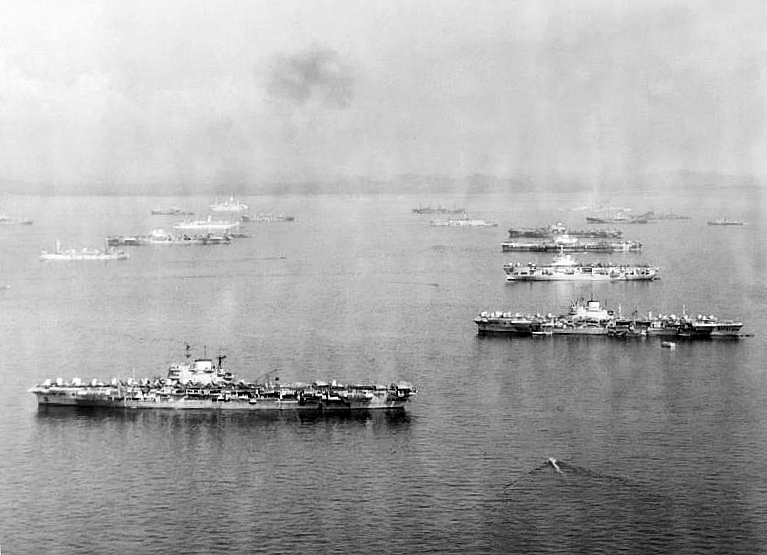
Carriers of the British Pacific Fleet, 1945

- HMS Colossus
- HMS Formidable
- HMS Illustrious
- HMS Indefatigable
- HMS Indomitable
- HMS Implacable
- HMS Venerable
- HMS Victorious

== Satellite airfields ==
- Jervis Bay
- Vineyards
