= 3rd Carrier Air Group =

Royal Navy Fleet Air Arm Carrier Air Group

- White Ensign
- Active: 2 August 1945 - 20 October 1945
- Country: United Kingdom
- Branch: Royal Navy
- Type: Carrier Air Group
- Size: 2 x fighter squadron; 1 x TBR squadron
- Part of: Fleet Air Arm
- Formed for: spare Illustrious-class aircraft carrier group

3rd Carrier Air Group (3rd CAG) was a Fleet Air Arm (FAA) carrier air group of the Royal Navy (RN). It was formed in August 1945 as a spare group for an Illustrious-class aircraft carrier. The group was based at HMS Nabbington, a Royal Navy, Mobile Naval Operating Air Base (MONAB), established at the Royal Australian Air Force (RAAF) base RAAF Nowra at Nowra, New South Wales, in Australia.

== Naval Air Squadrons ==
3rd Carrier Air Group consisted of a number of squadrons of the Fleet Air Arm.

Squadron	Aircraft	From	To
854 Naval Air Squadron	Grumman Avenger Mk.III	August 1945	October 1945
1843 Naval Air Squadron	Vought Corsair Mk IV	August 1945	October 1945
1845 Naval Air Squadron	Vought Corsair Mk II, IV	August 1946	October 1945

== History ==
In the aftermath of World War II in Europe, the Fleet Air Arm's squadrons, which were based on the Royal Navy's Fleet and Light Fleet aircraft carriers, underwent a reorganisation into Air Groups, aligning with the policies of the United States Navy. This restructuring aimed to improve operational efficiency in the Pacific Theater during the conflict against Japanese forces in 1945. Carrier Air Groups one through six were assigned to the three Illustrious-class aircraft carriers. Each air group comprised two squadrons of Vought Corsairs and one squadron of Grumman Avengers, with each squadron consisting of fifteen aircraft.

=== 1945 ===
The 3rd Carrier Air Group was established on 2 August 1945 at HMS Nabbington a Royal Navy, Mobile Operational Naval Air Base (MONAB), that was established at the Royal Australian Air Force (RAAF) base RAAF Nowra at Nowra, New South Wales, in Australia, serving as a reserve carrier air group for the British Pacific Fleet. Unfortunately, it was created too late to participate in the Second World War. The 3rd Carrier Air Group included 854 Naval Air Squadron, which operated the Grumman Avenger, an American torpedo bomber, along with 1843 Naval Air Squadron and 1845 Naval Air Squadron, both of which were equipped with the Vought Corsair, an American fighter aircraft.

The 3rd CAG was disbanded on 20 October 1945 at RNAS Nowra, and its personnel were repatriated to the United Kingdom aboard a merchant vessel, the SS Stratheden

== Air Group Commanders ==
List of commanding officers of 3rd Carrier Air Group with date of appointment:

- Commander N.S. Luaard (temp), from 2 August 1945
- Commander J.C.N. Shrubsole, RN, from 8 September 1945

== See also ==
- List of Fleet Air Arm groups
- List of aircraft carriers of the Royal Navy
- List of aircraft of the Fleet Air Arm
- List of Fleet Air Arm aircraft in World War II
