= RNAS Eglinton =

Former Royal Naval Air Station in County Londonderry, Northern Ireland

RNAS Eglinton (HMS Gannet) USAAF Station AAF-344 RAF Eglinton
- Eglinton, County Londonderry in Northern Ireland
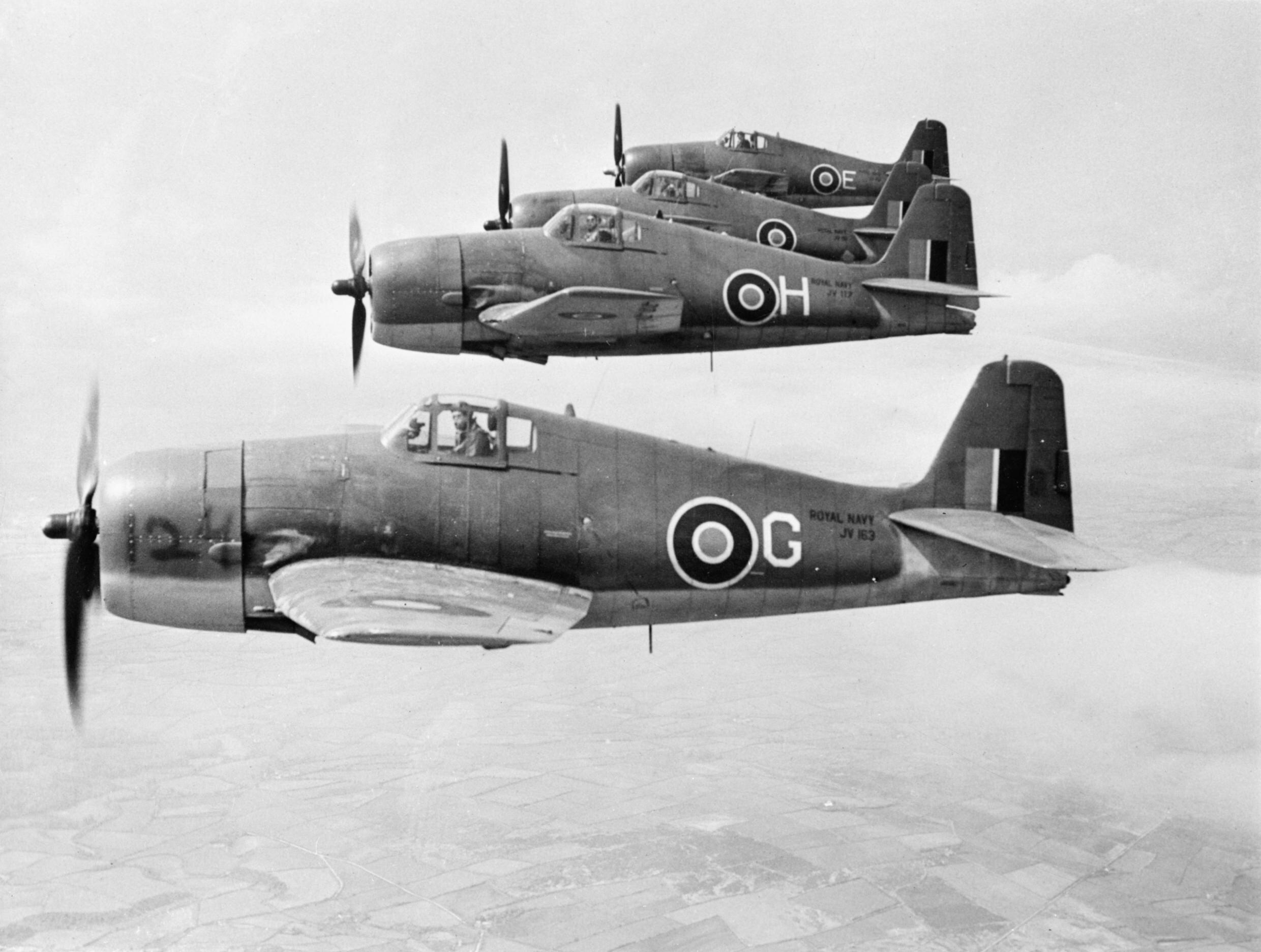
- Grumman Hellcats of 1840 Naval Air Squadron based at RNAS Eglinton, 23 June 1944

Site information
- Type: Royal Naval Air Station
- Code: QN
- Owner: Ministry of Defence
- Operator: Royal Air Force; United States Army Air Forces; Royal Navy
- Controlled by: RAF Fighter Command 1941-42 * No. 13 Group RAF; Eighth Air Force 1942-43; Fleet Air Arm
- Condition: Civil aviation

Location
- Shown within Northern Ireland RNAS Eglinton (the United Kingdom)
- Coordinates: 55°02′35″N 007°09′34″W

Site history
- Built: 1940/41
- Built by: Stewart Partners Ltd
- In use: April 1941 - September 1966
- Fate: became City of Derry Airport
- Battles/wars: European theatre of World War II; South West Pacific theatre of World War II; Cold War

Airfield information
- Elevation: 8 metres (26 ft) AMSL
Runways
Direction	Length and surface
00/00	Tarmac
00/00	Tarmac
00/00	Tarmac

Royal Naval Air Station Eglinton, or more commonly known as RNAS Eglinton; (commissioned HMS Gannet), was a Royal Navy Naval Air Station located 1.3 miles (2.1 km) north east of Eglinton, in County Londonderry, Northern Ireland. It opened as a Royal Air Force Station (RAF Eglinton) in 1941, before being transferred to the Admiralty for use by the Fleet Air Arm in May 1943.

The airfield was operational between 1941 and 1966.

== History ==
=== Royal Air Force use ===
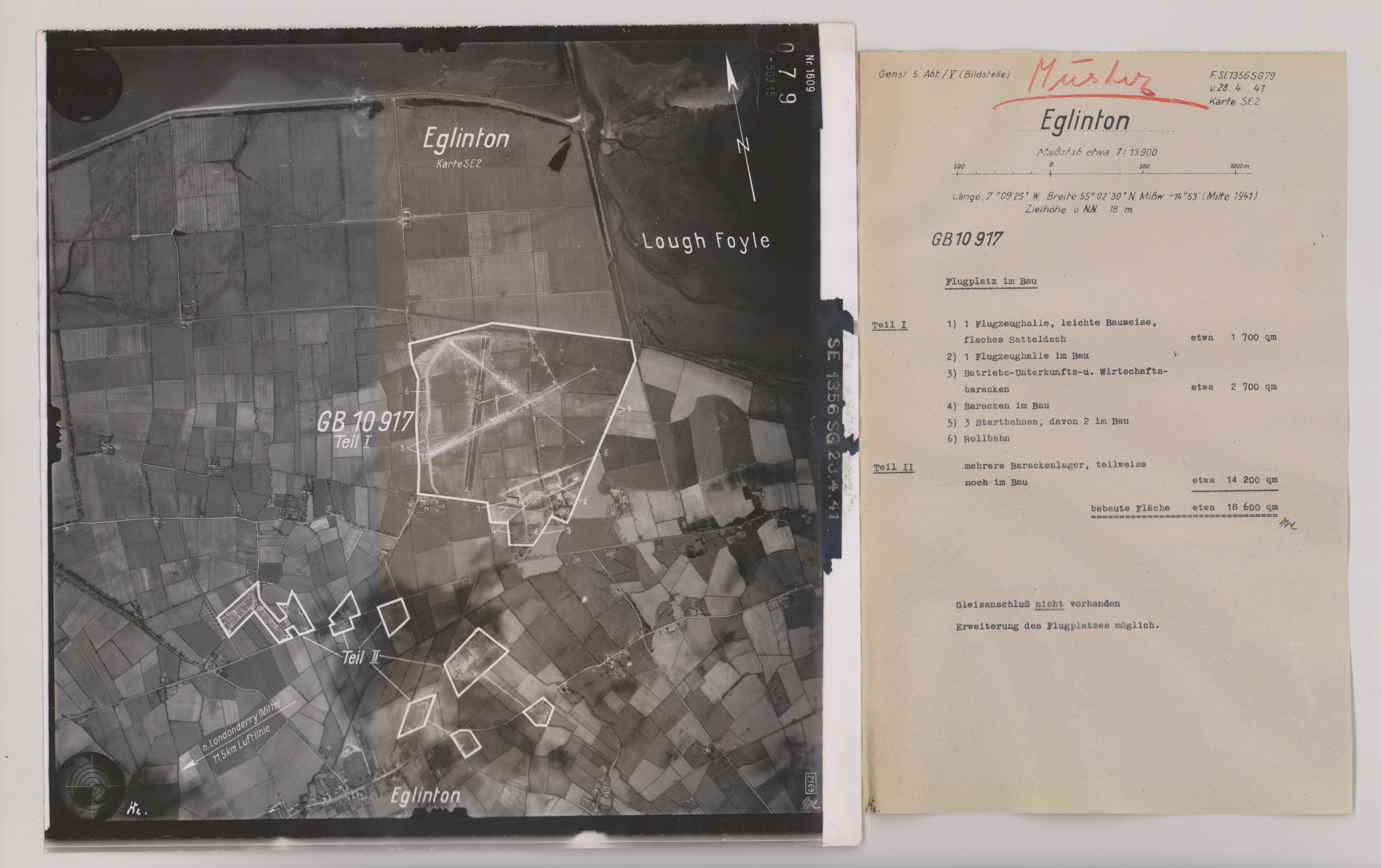
RNAS Eglinton on a target dossier of the German Luftwaffe, 1941

The Royal Naval Air Station has its origins in the early Second World War when in 1941 RAF Eglinton was established as the home to No. 133 Squadron RAF which flew Hawker Hurricane fighters in defence of Londonderry. In 1942 the airfield was occupied by No. 41 Squadron RAF when it moved in on 22 September flying the Supermarine Spitfire VB before moving to RAF Llanbedr on 20 September 1942. The station was briefly used by the United States Army Air Forces between 1942 and 1943, it was then allocated to the Royal Navy and the airfield became a Fleet Air Arm airfield called RNAS Eglinton (HMS Gannet) and was home to the 1847 Naval Air Squadron which provided convoy air cover as part of the Battle of the Atlantic.

=== Royal Navy use ===
RNAS Eglinton (HMS Gannet) was commissioned on 15 May 1943 following its transfer on loan from the Royal Air Force earlier that month.

Located on the southern shore of Lough Foyle near Eglinton, County Londonderry, the station served as a major Fleet Air Arm establishment in Northern Ireland during and after the Second World War.

Its functions included accommodating disembarked front-line squadrons, operating a Squadron Forming Unit, and hosting the No. 2 Seafire Servicing Unit, No. 3 Naval Fighter School, Joint Anti-Submarine School, and the Sonobuoy Training Nucleus of the Air Radar School.

The airfield also operated as an all-weather station and served as the parent station for RNAS Maydown between 1943 and 1944 and again from 1945.

The air station's main function was to work up fighter squadrons' pilots before joining the attacks on Japan. RNAS Maydown (HMS Shrike) with Fairey Swordfish aircraft next door to Eglinton received Battle Honours for its role in the Battle of the Atlantic from 1943 until 1945. Its commanding officer was Commander Thomas Jameson.

== Facilities ==
The airfield was equipped with three tarmac runways, extensive radio and radar facilities, aircraft dispersal areas, hangars and workshops.

Accommodation was provided in dispersed camps south of the airfield, with capacity for more than 200 officers, over 1,400 ratings, and more than 230 members of the Women's Royal Naval Service.

April 1959 saw RNAS Eglinton close and the squadrons moved to RAF Ballyhalbert and RAF Ballykelly. In 1989 the married quarter estate comprising 78 houses located in Fraser Avenue and Mill Path in the nearby village of Eglinton were sold to a Roger Byron-Collins company who also acquired the officers married quarters in nearby RAF Ballykelly in 2009.

== Posted units ==
A number of units were here at some point:

=== Naval Air Wings ===
- 5th Naval Fighter Wing
- 7th Naval Fighter Wing
- 10th Naval Fighter Wing

=== Carrier Air Groups ===
- 13th Carrier Air Group
- 14th Carrier Air Group
- 15th Carrier Air Group
- 17th Carrier Air Group
- 20th Carrier Air Group

=== Training Air Groups ===
- 51st Training Air Group
- 52nd Training Air Group
- 53rd Training Air Group

=== Naval Air Squadrons ===
- 706 Naval Air Squadron
- 718 Naval Air Squadron
- 719 Naval Air Squadron
- 725 Naval Air Squadron
- 737 Naval Air Squadron
- 744 Naval Air Squadron
- 745 Naval Air Squadron
- 768 Naval Air Squadron
- 782 Naval Air Squadron
- 794 Naval Air Squadron
- 795 Naval Air Squadron
- 800 Naval Air Squadron
- 802 Naval Air Squadron
- 803 Naval Air Squadron
- 804 Naval Air Squadron
- 805 Naval Air Squadron
- 806 Naval Air Squadron
- 807 Naval Air Squadron
- 808 Naval Air Squadron
- 810 Naval Air Squadron
- 811 Naval Air Squadron
- 812 Naval Air Squadron
- 813 Naval Air Squadron
- 814 Naval Air Squadron
- 815 Naval Air Squadron flew its 12 Westland Whirlwinds from RNAS Eglinton to RNAS Portland on 14 April 1959.
- 816 Naval Air Squadron
- 819 Naval Air Squadron
- 820 Naval Air Squadron
- 821 Naval Air Squadron
- 824 Naval Air Squadron
- 825 Naval Air Squadron
- 827 Naval Air Squadron
- 833 Naval Air Squadron
- 834 Naval Air Squadron
- 835 Naval Air Squadron
- 837 Naval Air Squadron
- 838 Naval Air Squadron
- 845 Naval Air Squadron
- 847 Naval Air Squadron
- 848 Naval Air Squadron
- 849 Naval Air Squadron
  - 849C Flight
  - 849D Flight
- 850 Naval Air Squadron
- 852 Naval Air Squadron
- 853 Naval Air Squadron
- 856 Naval Air Squadron
- 878 Naval Air Squadron
- 881 Naval Air Squadron
- 882 Naval Air Squadron
- 886 Naval Air Squadron
- 887 Naval Air Squadron
- 890 Naval Air Squadron
- 891 Naval Air Squadron
- 892 Naval Air Squadron
- 894 Naval Air Squadron
- 896 Naval Air Squadron
- 898 Naval Air Squadron
- 1830 Naval Air Squadron
- 1831 Naval Air Squadron
- 1832 Naval Air Squadron
- 1835 Naval Air Squadron
- 1837 Naval Air Squadron
- 1840 Naval Air Squadron
- 1841 Naval Air Squadron
- 1842 Naval Air Squadron
- 1843 Naval Air Squadron
- 1844 Naval Air Squadron
- 1845 Naval Air Squadron
- 1846 Naval Air Squadron
- 1847 Naval Air Squadron
- 1850 Naval Air Squadron
- 1851 Naval Air Squadron
- 1852 Naval Air Squadron

A number of RAF squadrons were here at some point:

- No. 41 Squadron RAF with the Spitfire Vb
- No. 133 Squadron RAF with the Hurricane IIb & Spitfire IIa
- No. 134 Squadron RAF with the Spitfire Va. IIa, Vb & Hurricane IIb
- No. 152 Squadron RAF with the Spitfire IIa & Vb
- No. 275 Squadron RAF
- No. 485 Squadron RAF
- No. 501 Squadron RAF
- No. 504 Squadron RAF

A number of units were here at some point:

- 52nd Fighter Group
  - 2nd Fighter Squadron
  - 4th Fighter Squadron
  - 5th Fighter Squadron
- No. 1493 (Target Towing) Flight RAF became No. 1493 (Fighter) Gunnery Flight RAF
- No. 2707 Squadron RAF Regiment
- No. 2754 Squadron RAF Regiment
- No. 2756 Squadron RAF Regiment
- Joint Anti-Submarine School

== Current use ==
The current RNAS Eglinton site is now used by the City of Derry Airport in County Londonderry with HMS Gannet a Fleet Air Arm base established in 1971 at RNAS Prestwick in Ayrshire.

== See also ==
- List of air stations of the Royal Navy
- List of former Royal Air Force stations
