= 854 Naval Air Squadron =

Inactive flying squadron of the Royal Navy's Fleet Air Arm

- Squadron badge
- Active: 1944–1945; 2006–2014
- Disbanded: 4 December 2014
- Country: United Kingdom
- Branch: Royal Navy
- Type: Torpedo Bomber Reconnaissance squadron
- Role: Carrier-based: anti-submarine warfare (ASW); anti-surface warfare (ASuW); Carrier-based Airborne Surveillance and Control (ASaC)
- Part of: Fleet Air Arm
- Mottos: Audentes Fortuna Juvat (Latin for 'Fortune Helps the Daring')
- Colors: Red and Black
- Engagements: World War II: European theatre of World War II; Operation Neptune; Pacific War; Operation Robson; Operation Meridian; Operation Iceberg; War in Afghanistan: Operation Herrick
- Battle honours: Normandy 1944; English Channel 1944; North Sea 1944; East Indies 1944; Palembang 1945; Okinawa 1945

Commanders
- Notable commanders: Lieutenant Commander Robert Edmond Jess, DSC, RCNVR

Insignia
- Squadron Badge Description: Blue, from a base barry wavy of four white and blue a sword in pale silver surmounted by a lion passant regardant winged gold armed and langued red (1940)
- Identification Markings: 4A+, later J4A+ (Avenger); to Q4A+ (Avenger December 1944); 180-192 (Sea King)

Aircraft flown
- Bomber: Grumman Avenger
- Multirole helicopter: Westland Sea King

854 Naval Air Squadron (854 NAS), sometimes expressed as 854 Squadron, is an inactive Fleet Air Arm (FAA) naval air squadron of the United Kingdom's Royal Navy (RN). It most recently operated Westland Sea King ASaC.7 airborne surveillance and control helicopter between December 2006 and December 2014.

It first formed in January 1944 at Squantum Naval Air Station in the United States, flying Grumman Avenger. It was disbanded in December 1945, and reformed December 2006 as a helicopter squadron designed for Airborne Surveillance and Control.

== History ==
=== Avenger (1944-1945) ===
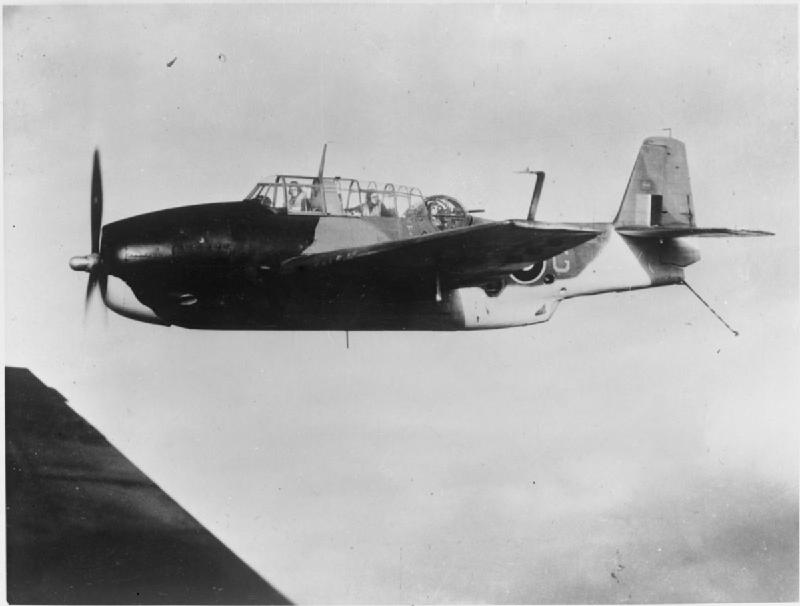
Grumman Avenger; an example of the type used by 854 Squadron

854 Naval Air Squadron was established on 1 January 1944, at RN Air Section Squantum, located at Naval Air Station Squantum in Quincy, Massachusetts. It was designated as a Torpedo Bomber Reconnaissance unit and was equipped with twelve Grumman Avenger Mk.II torpedo bombers, which embarked in the Illustrious-class aircraft carrier HMS Indomitable on 10 April.

On 23 May, the squadron was designated to RAF Coastal Command as a component of No. 157 Wing, initially at RAF Hawkinge, Kent and subsequently at RAF Thorney Island, West Sussex, throughout the Normandy landings. In the months of July and August, the squadron conducted sixty-two night assaults on E- and R-boats situated off the coasts of the Netherlands, Belgium, and France, and received recognition for the destruction of two V-1 flying bombs.

Upon returning to the Fleet Air Arm at RNAS Lee-on-Solent (HMS Daedalus), on 27 August, the aircraft were not taken along and personnel boarded the escort carrier HMS Activity, on 7 September, heading for Ceylon. The squadron personnel disembarked to the RN Air Section at RAF Cochin, India, on 7 October. Equipped with Grumman Avenger Mk.I aircraft, upon their arrival at RNAS Katukurunda (HMS Ukussa), Ceylon, on 11 October, they commenced training.

The squadron commenced operations with the name ship of her class HMS Illustrious on 1 December engaging in bombing missions against targets in Sumatra from December 1944 to January 1945, with operations at Belawan Deli and Palembang, Operation Robson and Operation Meridian respectively, when the Commanding Officer was lost in action. In March and April, assaults were conducted on targets in the Sakishima Gunto group of islands, located in the East China Seas, as part of Operation Iceberg.

In the subsequent month, the squadron disembarked, resulting in the loss of its aircraft. It was re-equipped with Grumman Avenger Mk.IIIs at RNAS Nowra (HMS Nabbington), New South Wales, in July 1945. Despite becoming part of the 3rd Carrier Air Group, the squadron experienced another loss of its aircraft in September 1945 and subsequently disbanded upon its return to the United Kingdom on 8 December 1945.

=== Sea King (2006-2014) ===
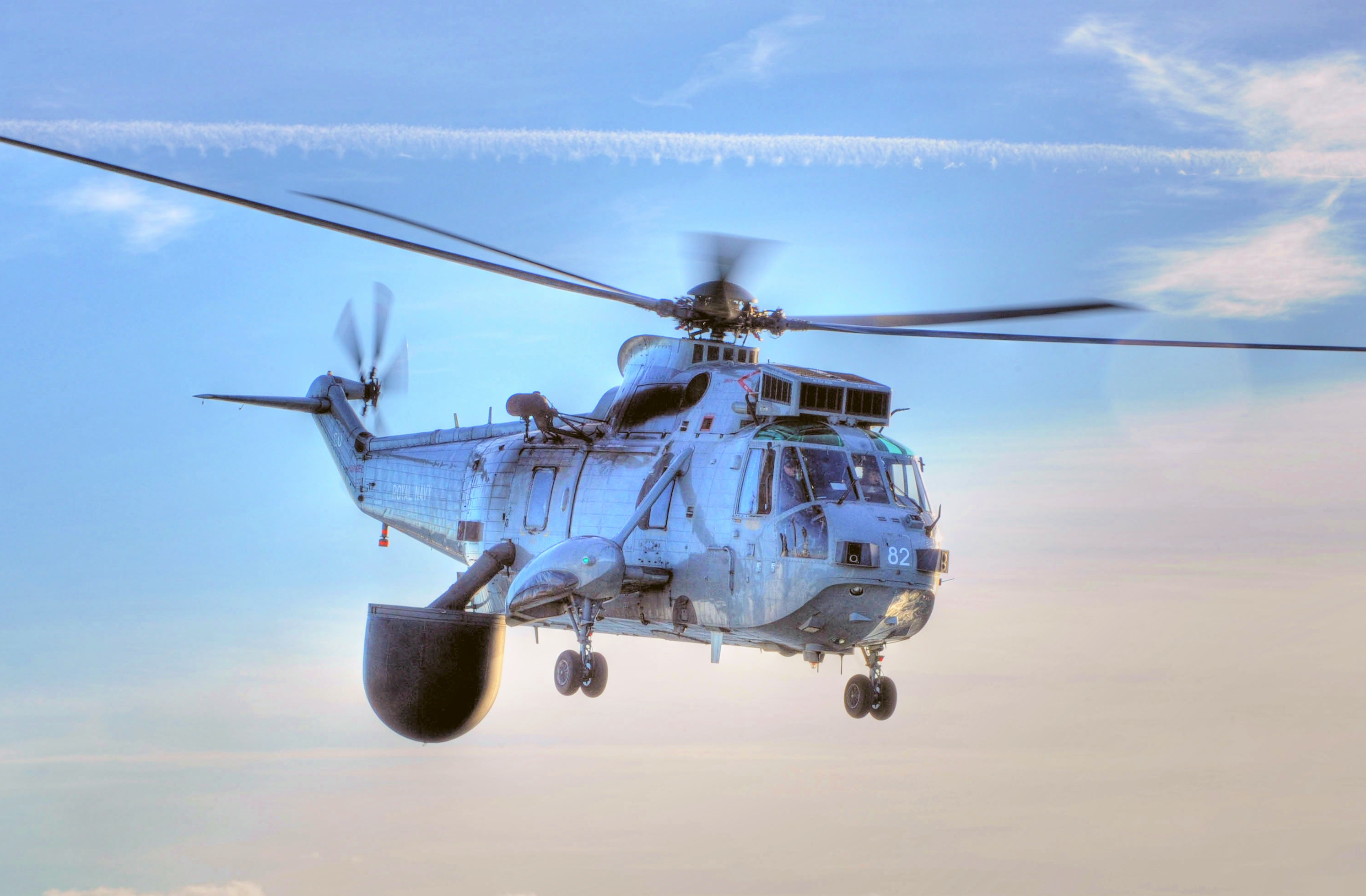
Westland Sea King ASaC.7

854 Naval Air Squadron reformed on 8 December 2006, followed by a ceremony on 13 December 2006 at RNAS Culdrose (HMS Seahawk), the unit reformed with three Westland Sea King ASaC.7 airborne early warning helicopters, previously 'A' Flight, 849 Squadron.

From March to July 2007 the squadron carried out counter-drug operations on board HMS Ocean, and helped to seize a tonne of cocaine.

In May 2009, 854 Squadron dispatched three Westland Sea King ASaC.7 helicopters to Afghanistan. This deployment was succeeded by another in November 2010, which was subsequently relieved by 857 Squadron in March 2012, after which they returned to RNAS Culdrose. Furthermore, they participated in the security operation for the London 2012 Olympics from mid-July to mid-September, detaching to RAF Northolt, in London.

In April 2014, 854 was redeployed to Afghanistan to replace 857, and it became the final Fleet Air Arm unit to exit Afghanistan in July, subsequently transitioning to operations in the Gulf for a duration of two months.

The squadron was disbanded in December 2014, subsequently being absorbed into 849 Squadron, as the latter evolved into three separate flights.

== Aircraft operated ==
The squadron has operated three variants of a fixed wing and a single rotary wing, aircraft type:

- Grumman Avenger Mk.II torpedo bomber aircraft (January -August 1944)
- Grumman Avenger Mk.I torpedo bomber aircraft (October 1944 - May 1945)
- Grumman Avenger Mk.III torpedo bomber aircraft (July - September 1945)
- Westland Sea King ASaC.7 airborne early warning helicopter (December 2006 - December 2014)

== Battle honours ==
The following Battle Honours have been awarded to 854 Naval Air Squadron:

- Normandy 1944
- English Channel 1944
- North Sea 1944
- East Indies 1944-45
- Palenbang 1945
- Okinawa 1945

== Assignments ==
854 Naval Air Squadron was assigned as needed to form part of a number of larger units:

- 3rd Carrier Air Group (2 August - 31 October 1945)

== Naval air stations ==
854 Naval Air Squadron was active at various naval air stations of the Royal Navy and Royal Air Force stations, both within the United Kingdom and internationally. Additionally, it operated from a couple of Royal Navy fleet and an escort carrier, as well as other airbases located abroad.

=== World War Two air stations and aircraft carriers ===
List of air stations and aircraft carriers used by 854 Naval Air Squadron during World War two including dates:

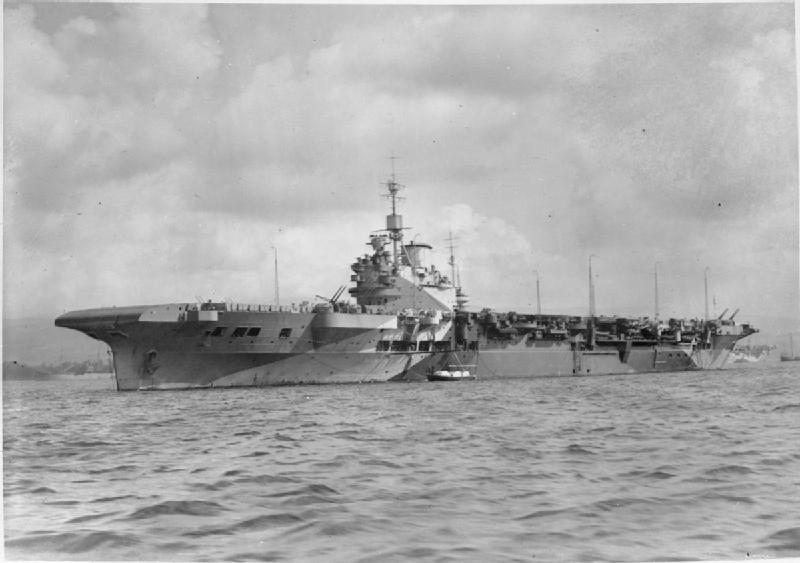
HMS Illustrious

- RN Air Section Squantum, Massachusetts, (1 January - 30 March 1944)
  - RN Air Section Norfolk, Virginia, (Detachment Deck Landing Training (DLT) USS Charger 23 - 25 March 1944)
- RN Air Section Norfolk, Virginia, (30 March - 10 April 1944)
- HMS Indomitable (10 April - 1 May 1944)
- Royal Naval Air Station Machrihanish (HMS Landrail), Argyll and Bute, (1 - 23 May 1944)
- Royal Air Force Hawkinge, Kent, (23 May - 7 August 1944)
- Royal Air Force Thorney Island, West Sussex, (7 - 27 August 1944)
- Royal Naval Air Station Lee-on-Solent (HMS Daedalus), Hampshire, (27 August - 7 September 1944)
- HMS Activity (crews) (7 September - 7 October 1944)
- RN Air Section Cochin, India, (7 - 11 October 1944)
- Royal Naval Air Station Katukurunda (HMS Ukussa), Ceylon, (11 October - 30 November 1944)
- Royal Naval Air Station Trincomalee (HMS Bambara), Ceylon, (30 November - 1 December 1944)
- HMS Illustrious (1 December 1944 - 9 February 1945)
  - Royal Naval Air Station Katukurunda (HMS Ukussa), Ceylon, (Detachment nine aircraft 22 December 1944 - 9 January 1945)
- RAAF Base Moruya, New South Wales, (9 - 11 February 1945)
- Royal Naval Air Station Nowra (HMS Nabbington), New south Wales, (11 February - 6 March 1945)
- HMS Illustrious (6 March - 18 May 1945)
- Royal Air Force Station Nowra (HMS Nabbington), New South Wales, (18 May - 20 October 1945)
- HMT Stratheden (crews) (20 October - 8 December 1945)
- disbanded UK - (8 December 1945)

=== Sea King (2006-2014) ===
List of air stations and aircraft carriers used by 854 Naval Air Squadron whilst operating Sea King ASaC.7 including dates:

- Royal Air Force Station Culdrose (HMS Seahawk), Cornwall, (8 December 2006 - 19 February 2007)
- HMS Ocean (19 February - 12 July 2007)
- Royal Air Force Station Culdrose (HMS Seahawk), Cornwall, (12 July - 12 November 2007)
- RFA Argus (12 November 2007 - 19 March 2008)
- Royal Air Force Station Culdrose (HMS Seahawk), Cornwall, (19 March - 1 July 2008)
- HMS Ark Royal (1 - 29 July 2008)
- Royal Air Force Station Culdrose (HMS Seahawk), Cornwall, (29 July - 6 October 2008)
  - Royal Air Force Leuchars, Fife, (Detachment 24 September - 5 October 2008)
- HMS Ark Royal (6 - 24 October 2008)
- Royal Air Force Station Culdrose (HMS Seahawk), Cornwall, (24 October 2008 - 20 May 2009)
- Camp Bastion, Afghanistan, (20 May - 16 October 2009)
- Royal Air Force Station Culdrose (HMS Seahawk), Cornwall, (16 October 2009 - 24 February 2010)
- Camp Bastion, Afghanistan, (24 February - 3 August 2010)
- Royal Air Force Station Culdrose (HMS Seahawk), Cornwall, (3 August - 6 December 2010)
- Camp Bastion, Afghanistan, (6 December 2010 - 2 March 2012)
- Royal Air Force Station Culdrose (HMS Seahawk), Cornwall, (2 March - 14 July 2012)
- Royal Air Force Northolt, Greater London, (14 July - 17 August 2012)
- Royal Air Force Station Culdrose (HMS Seahawk), Cornwall, (17 August 2012 - 13 April 2014)
- Camp Bastion, Afghanistan, (13 April - 25 July 2014)
- Al Minhad Air Base, United Arab Emirates, (25 July - 25 September 2014)
- Royal Air Force Station Culdrose (HMS Seahawk), Cornwall, (25 September - 4 December 2014)
- disbanded - (4 December 2014)

== Commanding officers ==
List of commanding officers of 854 Naval Air Squadron:

1944 - 1945

- Lieutenant Commander W.J. Mainprice, DFC, RN, from 1 January 1944 (KiA 29 January 1945)
- Lieutenant R.E. Jess, RCNVR, from 29 January
- Lieutenant Commander(A) F.C. Nottingham, DSC, RNVR, from 21 February 1945
- Lieutenant Commander R.E. Jess, DSC, RCNVR, from 28 March 1945
- Lieutenant Commander(A) F.C. Nottingham, DSC, RNVR, from 17 April 1945
- none from 28 June 1945
- disbanded - 8 December 1945

2006 - 2014

- Lieutenant Commander D.M. Biggs, RN, from 13 December 2006
- Lieutenant Commander A.D. Tite, RN, from 15 January 2008
- Lieutenant Commander P.D. Harrison, RN, 13 March 2010
- Lieutenant Commander J.W.L Ling, RN, from 23 May 2012
- Lieutenant Commander R.J. Kennedy, RN, from 10 July 2014
- disbanded - 4 December 2014

Note: Abbreviation (A) signifies Air Branch of the RN or RNVR.

== See also ==
- Operation Herrick aerial order of battle
