= HMS Slinger (D26) =

American escort carrier transferred to the Royal Navy

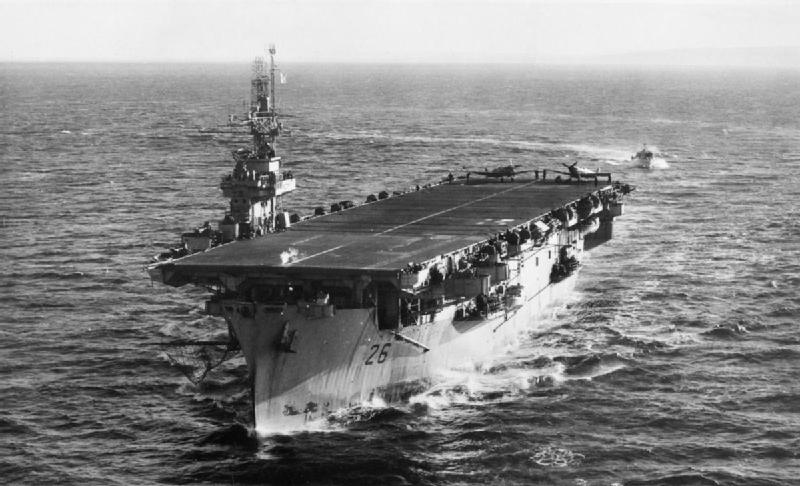
- HMS Slinger in 1944

History

United States
- Name: Chatham
- Builder: Seattle-Tacoma Shipbuilding Corporation
- Laid down: 25 May 1942
- Launched: 19 September 1942
- Fate: Transferred to Royal Navy

United Kingdom
- Name: Slinger
- Commissioned: 11 August 1943
- Decommissioned: 12 April 1946
- Identification: Pennant number:D26
- Fate: Sold as merchant ship, scrapped 1969-1970

General characteristics
- Class & type: Bogue-class escort carrier (USA); Ruler-class escort carrier (UK)
- Displacement: 8,333 tons
- Length: 496 ft (151 m)
- Beam: 69 ft 6 in (21.18 m)
- Draught: 26 ft 3 in (8.00 m)
- Propulsion: Steam turbines, 1 shaft, 8,500 shp (6.3 MW)
- Speed: 18 knots (33 km/h)
- Complement: 646 officers and men
- Armament: 2 × 4"/50, 5"/38 or 5"/51 guns; 8 × twin 40 mm Bofors; 35 × single 20 mm Oerlikon
- Aircraft carried: 18-24

USS Chatham (CVE-32) (originally designated AVG-32, then later ACV-32) was built at the Seattle-Tacoma S/Y, Hull #27, Seattle, Washington, and fitted-out in Portland, Oregon. She was transferred to the United Kingdom 11 August 1943 under lend-lease and renamed HMS Slinger (D26). Designated as a transport carrier, the ship was mined, off Lowestoft, on 5 February 1944 but returned to service on 17 October, and worked-up a new crew.

In early-1945, she was sent to Sydney to join the Pacific Fleet as a replenishment vessel i.e. carrying spare planes for other carriers - attached to the 30th Aircraft Carrier Squadron. The Slinger was accorded the battle honour ‘Okinawa’, though her participation was indirect. Returning to Sydney, she ferried aircraft to/from Brisbane, before being ear-marked for the force that was to invade Japan; in the event, she stood-by at Manus, Philippines, as the bombing of Hiroshima and Nagasaki ended the war.

In August 1945, she was sent to Hong Kong as a support vessel, and in the autumn made at least two trips to Sydney, returning civilians who had been interned. She returned to UK via Colombo, Cairo and Gibraltar in late-1945 into early-1946.

She was returned to United States custody on 27 February 1946, and was sold and converted by the Robin Line, and was re-launched on 21 November 1946 as Robin Mowbray. Moore-McCormack Lines, Inc., purchased Robin Line in 1958. She was scrapped in Kaohsiung Taiwan in 1969–1970.

== Design and description ==
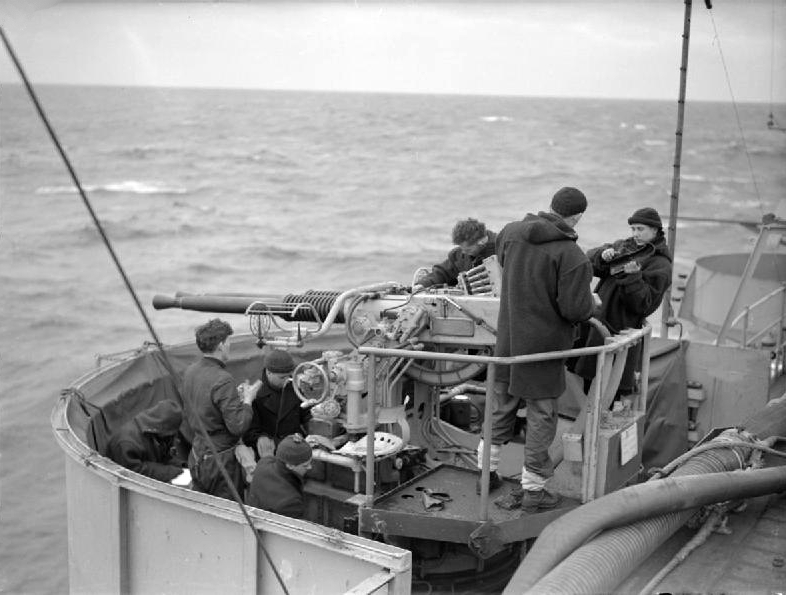
Twin 40 mm Bofors anti-aircraft gun.

The Ruler class were larger and had a greater aircraft capacity than preceding American built escort carriers. They were also all laid down as escort carriers and not converted merchant ships. All the ships had a complement of 646 men and an overall length of 492 feet 3 inches (150.0 m), a beam of 69 feet 6 inches (21.2 m) and a draught of 25 ft 6 in (7.8 m). Propulsion was provided by one shaft, two boilers and a steam turbine giving 9,350 shaft horsepower (6,970 kW), which could propel the ship at 16.5 knots (30.6 km/h; 19.0 mph).

Aircraft facilities were a small combined bridge–flight control on the starboard side, two aircraft lifts 43 feet (13.1 m) by 34 feet (10.4 m), one aircraft catapult and nine arrestor wires. Aircraft could be housed in the 260 feet (79.2 m) by 62 feet (18.9 m) hangar below the flight deck. Armament comprised: two 4"/50, 5"/38 or 5"/51 dual purpose guns in single mounts, sixteen 40 mm Bofors anti-aircraft guns in twin mounts and twenty 20 mm Oerlikon anti-aircraft cannons in single mounts. They had a maximum aircraft capacity of twenty-four aircraft which could be a mixture of Grumman Martlet, Vought F4U Corsair or Hawker Sea Hurricane fighter aircraft and Fairey Swordfish or Grumman Avenger anti-submarine aircraft.
