= HMS Nabswick =

Mobile Operational Naval Air Base (MONAB) of the Royal Navy

HMS Nabswick Mobile Operational Naval Air Base V
- at Jervis Bay Airfield, near Jervis Bay Village, Jervis Bay Territory in Australia

Site information
- Type: Mobile Operational Naval Air Base
- Owner: Australian Ministry of Defence
- Operator: Royal Navy
- Controlled by: Fleet Air Arm

Location
- Location in Jervis Bay Territory HMS Nabswick (Australia)
- Coordinates: 35°08′48″S 150°41′48″E

Site history
- In use: 1945 – 1946
- Fate: Returned to Royal Australian Air Force
- Battles/wars: World War II; Pacific War

Garrison information
- Garrison: MONAB V
- Occupants: Mobile Maintenance (MM) No. 4; Maintenance Servicing (MS) No. 7; Maintenance Servicing (MS) No. 8; Mobile, Storage & Reserve (MSR) No. 1; Mobile, Storage & Reserve (MSR) No. 2; Mobile Air Torpedo Maintenance Unit (MATMU) No. 6

Airfield information
- Elevation: 200 feet (61 m) AMSL
Runways
| Direction | Length and surface |
|---|---|
| 08/26 | 1,665 yards (1,522 m) x 50 yards (46 m) sealed gravel |
| 15/33 | 1,665 yards (1,522 m) x 50 yards (46 m) sealed gravel |
- Source: Royal Navy Research Archive

HMS Nabswick was a Royal Navy (RN), Mobile Operational Naval Air Base (MONAB) which was initially at the Royal Australian Air Force (RAAF) satellite airfield Jervis Bay Airfield situated near Jervis Bay Village, Jervis Bay Territory. HMS Nabswick was also known as MONAB V and Royal Naval Air Station Jervis Bay (or RNAS Jervis Bay).

== Commanding officers ==
List of commanding officers of HMS Nabswick with date of appointment:

- Captain H.G. Dickinson, DSC, RN, from 1 February 1945
- Commander T.K. Masterman, RN, (temporary command) from 9 March 1945
- Captain H.G. Dickinson, DSC, RN, from 1 May 1945
- Captain J.F.H. Sawyer, RN, from 18 November 1945

== Units based at HMS Nabswick ==
List of units associated with MONAB V, in support of disembarked front line Squadrons:

=== Function ===
- Support for disembarked front line squadrons

=== Aviation support components ===
- Mobile Maintenance (MM) No. 4
- Mobile Servicing (MS) No. 7
- Mobile Servicing (MS) No. 8
- Mobile, Storage & Reserve (MSR) No. 1
- Mobile, Storage & Reserve (MSR) No. 2
- Mobile Air Torpedo Maintenance Unit (MATMU) No. 6

=== Aircraft type supported ===
- Grumman Avenger Mk.I & II
- Fairey Barracuda Mk II
- Vought Corsair Mk II & IV
- Fairey Firefly I
- Miles Martinet TT.Mk I
