= Illustrious-class aircraft carrier =

Royal Navy aircraft carrier class

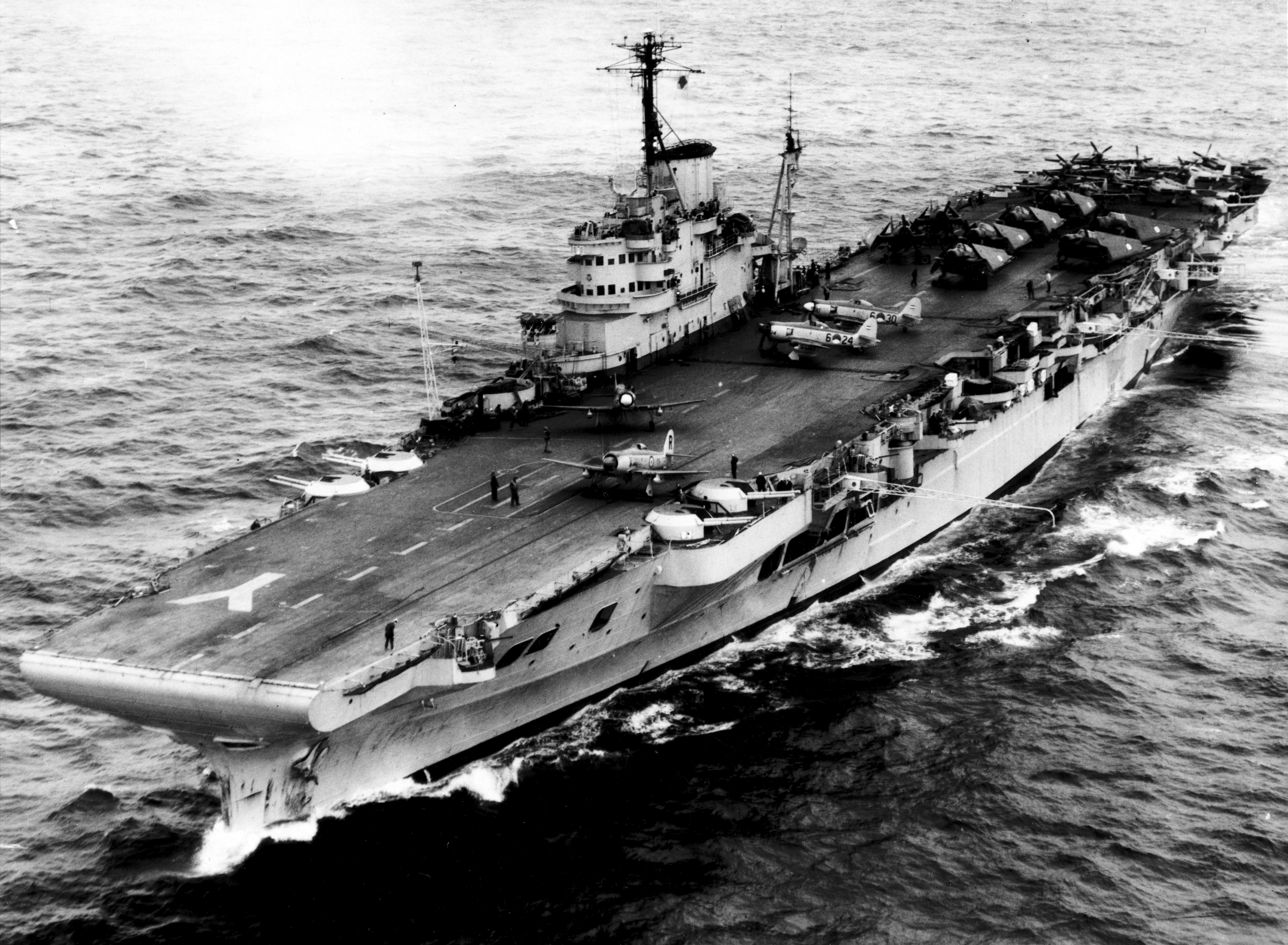
- HMS Illustrious in 1954

Class overview
- Builders: Vickers-Armstrongs (3), Harland & Wolff (1)
- Operators: Royal Navy
- Preceded by: HMS Ark Royal
- Succeeded by: Implacable class
- Subclasses: HMS Indomitable
- In commission: 1940–1968
- Planned: 6
- Completed: 4
- Scrapped: 4

General characteristics (Illustrious, as built)
- Type: Aircraft carrier
- Displacement: 23,000 long tons (23,000 t) (standard)
- Length: 740 ft (225.6 m) (o/a); 710 ft (216.4 m) (waterline)
- Beam: 95 ft 9 in (29.2 m)
- Draught: 28 ft 10 in (8.8 m) (deep load)
- Installed power: 6 Admiralty 3-drum boilers; 111,000 shp (83,000 kW)
- Propulsion: 3 shafts; 3 geared steam turbines
- Speed: 30.5 knots (56.5 km/h; 35.1 mph)
- Range: 10,700 nmi (19,800 km; 12,300 mi) at 10 knots (19 km/h; 12 mph)
- Complement: 1,229
- Sensors & processing systems: 1 × Type 79 early-warning radar
- Armament: 8 × twin QF 4.5-inch dual-purpose guns; 6 × octuple QF 2-pdr anti-aircraft guns
- Armour: Waterline belt: 4.5 in (114 mm); Flight deck: 3 in (76 mm); Bulkheads: 4.5 in (114 mm); Hangar sides: 4.5 in (114 mm); Magazines: 3–4.5 in (76–114 mm)
- Aircraft carried: 36–57
- Aviation facilities: 1 catapult

The Illustrious class was a class of aircraft carrier of the Royal Navy that included some of the most important British warships in the Second World War. They were laid down in the late 1930s as part of the rearmament of British forces in response to the emerging threats of Nazi Germany, Fascist Italy and Imperial Japan.

The Illustrious class comprised four vessels: HM Ships Illustrious, Formidable, Victorious and Indomitable. The last of these was built to a modified design with a second, half-length, hangar deck below the main hangar deck. Each of these ships played a prominent part in the battles of the Second World War. Victorious took part in the pursuit of the German battleship Bismarck, Illustrious and Formidable played prominent parts in the battles in the Mediterranean during 1940 and 1941 and all three took part in the large actions of the British Pacific Fleet in 1945.

The later two ships of the Implacable class were also built to modified designs to carry larger air wings. Implacable and Indefatigable both had two hangar levels, albeit with a limited 14-foot (4.3 m) head room.

== Design and concept ==
The Illustrious class was designed within the restrictions of the Second London Naval Treaty, which limited carrier size to an upper limit of 23,000 tons. They were different in conception to the Royal Navy's only modern carrier at the time, their predecessor HMS Ark Royal, and what may be described as their nearest American contemporaries, the Yorktown and Essex class carriers. The Illustrious class followed the Yorktown but preceded the Essex, the latter being designed after the US abandonment of the Second London Naval Treaty and its tonnage limitations.

Where other designs emphasised large air groups as the primary means of defence, the Illustrious class relied on their anti-aircraft armament and the passive defence provided by an armoured flight deck for survival, resulting in a reduced aircraft complement. Other carriers had armour carried on lower decks (e.g. the hangar deck or main deck); the unprotected flight deck and the hangar below it formed part of the superstructure, and were unprotected against even small bombs. However, the hangar could be made larger and thus more aircraft could be carried, but the differences in aircraft capacity between these carriers and their United States Navy (USN) counterparts is largely due to the some 100-foot-longer overall length of the US designs, and the USN's operational doctrine, which allowed for a permanent deck park of aircraft to augment their hangar capacity. Illustrious's hangar was 82% (Note: Friedman, in his works on RN and USN aircraft carriers stated that Enterprise's hangar measured 546 feet × 63 feet versus 456 × 62 feet for the Illustrious class, therefore Illustrious's hangar had 82% of Enterprise's hangar capacity.) as large as USS Enterprise's, but Enterprise typically carried 30% of her aircraft capacity in her deck park. Indomitable's two hangars were actually larger than Enterprise's, but she carried fewer aircraft because she did not have a large permanent deck park. In 1944/45 RN carriers began to carry a permanent deck park of similar size to their USN counterparts, and this increased their aircraft complement from 36 to an eventual 57 aircraft in the single-hangar carriers, and from 48 up to 81 in the double-hangar, 23,400-ton Implacable design, compared to 90–110 for the 27,500-ton US Essex class. (Note: On 5 June 1945, USS Bennington reported that her maximum hangar capacity was 51 aircraft, 15 Curtiss SB2C Helldivers and 36 Vought F4U Corsairs, and that 52 were carried as a deck park. At that time she carried 15 Avengers, 15 Helldivers, and the rest were a mix of F6F Wildcat and F4U Corsair fighters. She was prompted to utilize, and report on, her maximum hangar storage due to a typhoon.)

In the Illustrious class, armour was carried at the flight deck level—which became the strength deck—and formed an armoured box-like hangar that was an integral part of the ship's structure. However, to make this possible without increasing the displacement it was necessary to reduce the overhead height of the hangars to 16 ft (4.9 m) in the Illustrious class hangars and 14 ft (4.3 m) in the upper hangar of the Indomitable and 16 ft (4.9 m) in her lower hangar; these compared unfavourably to the 17 feet 3 inches (5.26 m) of the Yorktown class, 17 ft 6 in (5.33 m) in Essex class and 20 ft (6.1 m) in Lexington class. This restricted operations with larger aircraft designs, particularly post-war.

This armour scheme was designed to withstand 6" cruiser shellfire or 500 pound bombs (and heavier bombs dropped from low height or which struck at an angle); in the Home and Mediterranean theatres it was likely that the carriers would operate within the range of shore-based aircraft, which could carry heavier bombs than their carrier-based equivalents. The flight deck had an armoured thickness of 3 inches, closed by 4.5-inch sides and bulkheads. There were 3-inch strakes on either side extending from the box sides to the top edge of the main side belt, which was of 4.5 inches. The main belt protected the machinery, petrol storage, magazines and aerial weapon stores. The lifts were placed outside the hangar, at either end, with access through sliding armoured doors in the end bulkheads.

Later in the war it was found that bombs which penetrated and detonated inside the armoured hangar could cause structural deformation, as the latter was an integral part of the ship's structure.

Pre-war doctrine held that the ship's own firepower, rather than its aircraft, were to be relied upon for protection, since in the absence of radar, fighters were unlikely to intercept incoming attackers before they could release their weapons. Accordingly, the Illustrious class was given an extremely heavy anti-aircraft armament. The armament was similar to Ark Royal with twin 4.5 inch turrets (in a new "between-decks" or countersunk design) arranged on the points of a quadrant. The guns were mounted sufficiently high so that they could fire across the decks; de-fuelled aircraft would be stowed in the hangar for protection during aerial attack. The Illustrious class were fitted with four HACS controlled High Angle Director Towers, for fire control of her 4.5 inch guns. Illustrious pioneered the use of radar to vector carrier-borne fighters onto attacking or shadowing aircraft, and a Fairey Fulmar fighter from Illustrious achieved the first radar directed kill on 2 September 1940.

== Ships in class ==
Construction data
Name	Pennant	Builder	Ordered	Laid down	Launched	Commissioned	Fate
Illustrious	87	Vickers-Armstrongs, Barrow-in-Furness	13 April 1937	27 April 1937	5 April 1939	25 May 1940	Broken up at Gare Loch, 1957
Formidable	67	Harland & Wolff, Belfast	19 March 1937	17 June 1937	17 August 1939	24 November 1940	Broken up at Inverkeithing, 1953
Victorious	38	Vickers-Armstrongs, Wallsend	13 January 1937	4 May 1937	14 September 1939	14 May 1941	Broken up at Faslane, 1969
Indomitable	92	Vickers-Armstrongs, Barrow-in-Furness	6 July 1937	10 November 1937	26 March 1940	10 October 1941	Broken up at Faslane, 1955

=== Fate of the class ===
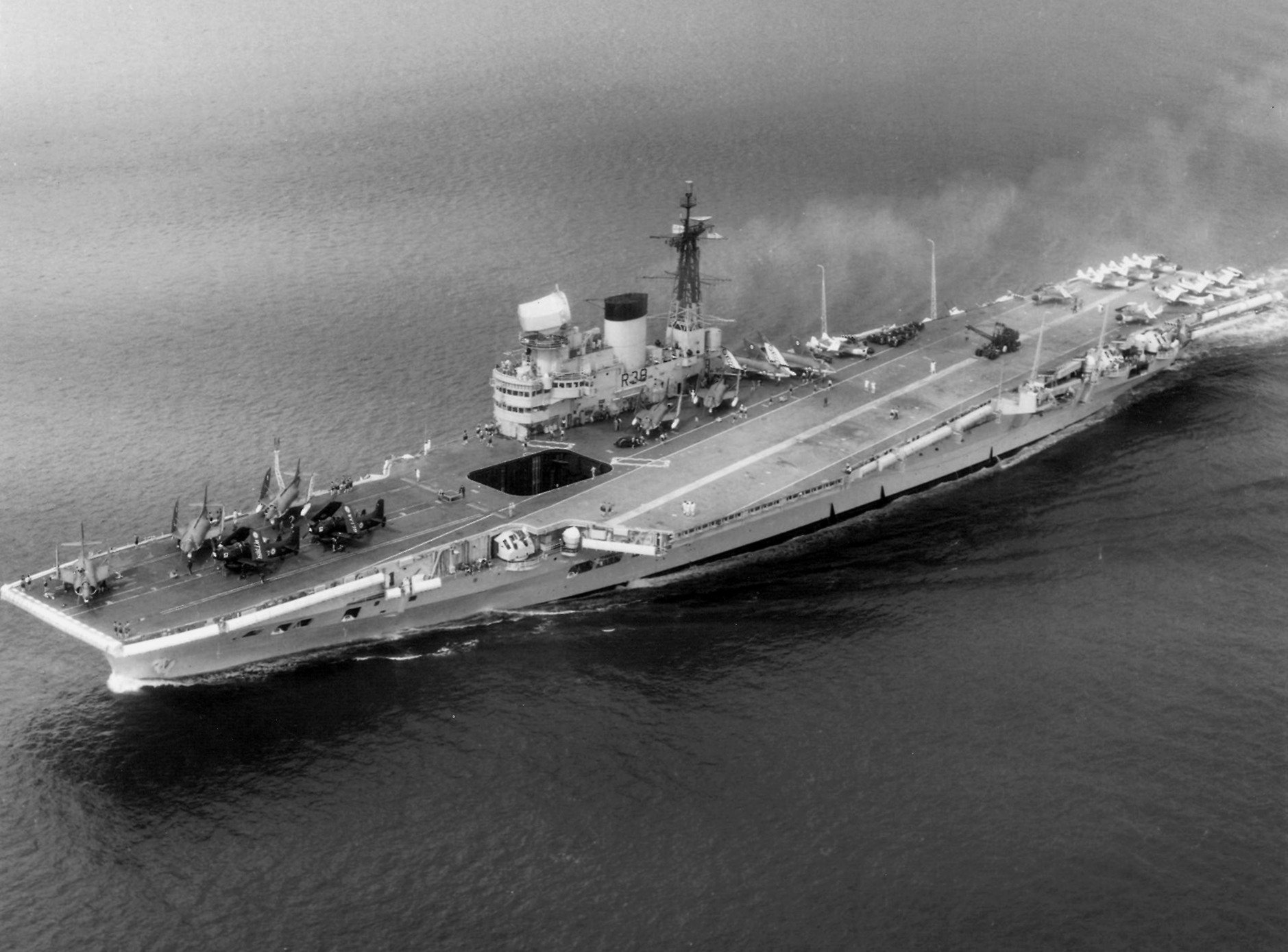
Victorious in 1959

All four early ships were hard worked during the Second World War, with Illustrious and Formidable suffering and surviving heavy damage. Like their contemporary USS Enterprise, they fought a long and consuming war, and, despite significant overhauls and repair of battle damage, were worn out by 1946, and were scrapped in the mid-1950s. Due to a variety of factors including Britain's dire post-war finances, and the consequent reductions in the size of the Royal Navy post-war modernization was limited to just the last of the class; Victorious. Over eight years between 1950 and 1957 she was extensively rebuilt incorporating modern equipment (angled flight deck, steam catapults) to enable her to operate Cold War-era jet aircraft. Although Victorious completed a refit in 1967, a minor fire with a manpower shortage and reduction in the naval budgets mean she was not recommissioned but retired in 1968 and sold for scrap. Indomitable was given an extensive refit, including new boilers, from 1948 to 1950, then served as flagship of the Home Fleet and also saw service in the Mediterranean. She suffered a hangar deck petrol explosion and fire in early 1953. She was placed in reserve after Queen Elizabeth II's October 1953 Coronation Review and was then scrapped in 1955.

== See also ==
- List of aircraft carriers
- List of ships of the Second World War
- List of ship classes of the Second World War
