= 1701 Naval Air Squadron =

Inactive flying squadron of the Royal Navy's Fleet Air Arm

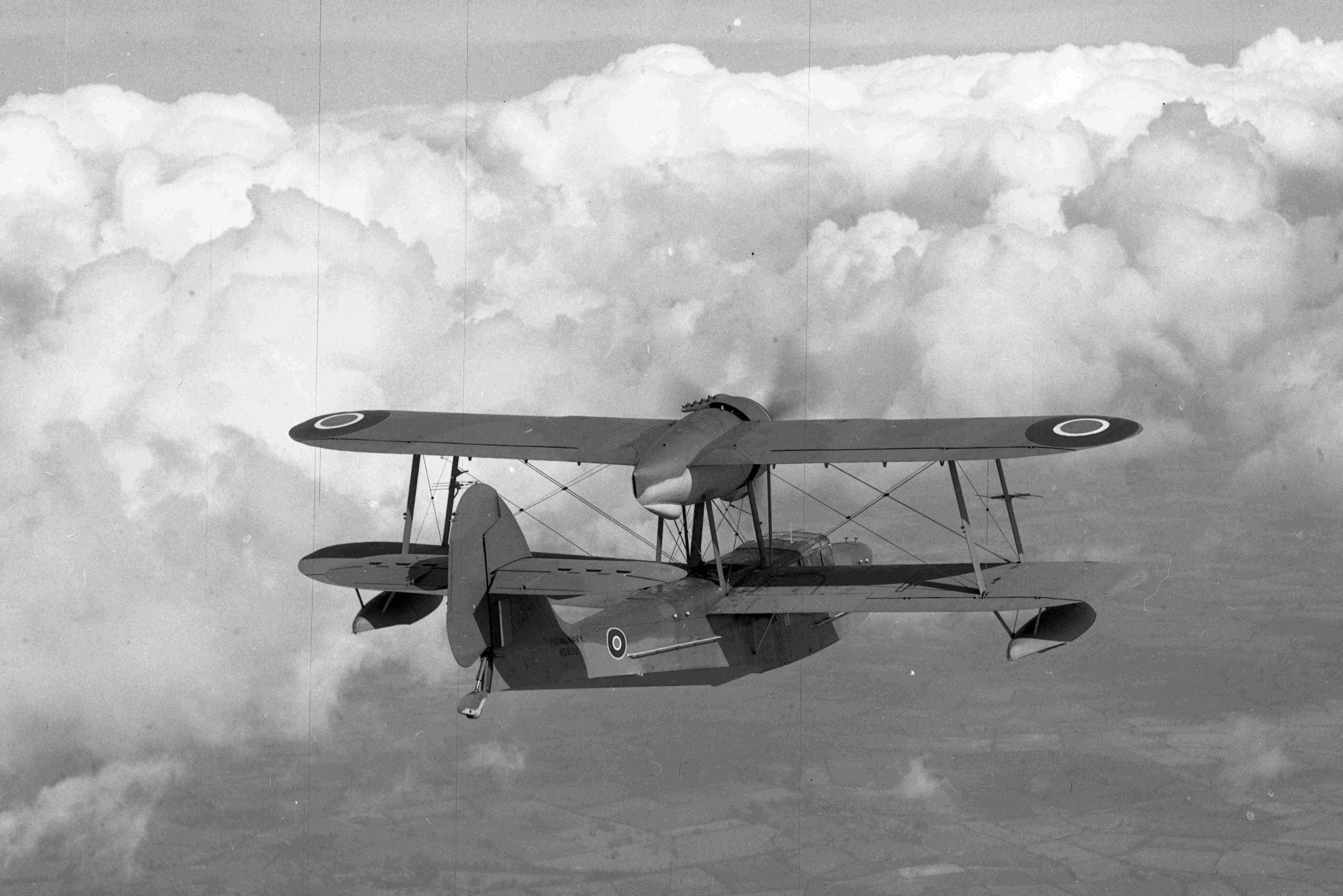
- Supermarine Sea Otter; an example of the type used by 1701 NAS
- Active: 1945–1946
- Disbanded: 27 August 1946
- Country: United Kingdom
- Branch: Royal Navy
- Type: Amphibian Bomber Reconnaissance Squadron
- Role: Air Sea Rescue
- Size: eight aircraft
- Part of: Fleet Air Arm
- Home station: See Naval air stations section for full list.

Insignia
- Identification Markings: P3A+ (RNAS Ponum); 340+ ('A' Flight November 1945)

Aircraft flown
- Patrol: Supermarine Sea Otter
- Trainer: Airspeed Oxford de Havilland Tiger Moth

1701 Naval Air Squadron (1701 NAS) was a Fleet Air Arm (FAA) naval air squadron of the United Kingdom’s Royal Navy (RN). It was formed in February 1945 at HMS Daedalus, RNAS Lee-on-Solent, as an amphibian bomber reconnaissance squadron. It was equipped with Supermarine Sea Otter, and the squadron joined HMS Begum in April 1945 bound for the Far East. The squadron was intended to join the newly established Mobile Naval Air Bases for Air Sea Rescue duties. 'B' Flight joined MONAB IV (HMS Nabaron) at RNAS Ponam in the Admiralty Islands in May 1945 and embarked in HMS Reaper in October 1945. 'A' Flight joined MONAB VI (HMS Nabstock) at RNAS Maryborough, Queensland, Australia in June 1945. The flights re-grouped in the autumn of 1945 at HMS Nabcatcher, RNAS Kai Tak, Hong Kong, where it disbanded during August 1946.

== History ==
=== Air Sea Rescue (1945-1946) ===
1701 Naval Air Squadron formed on 1 August 1945 as an Air Sea Rescue (ASR) squadron at RNAS Lee-on-Solent (HMS Daedalus), Hampshire, England. It was initially equipped with six Supermarine Sea Otter, an amphibious maritime patrol and air sea rescue aircraft, planned for operations in the Pacific. The squadron personnel consisted commanding officer Lieutenant(A) L.F. Plant, RNVR, six pilots and six Telegraphist Air Gunners. In late March the initial six Supermarine Sea Otter were withdrawn and replaced with eight new ones, before the squadron travelled to RNAS Belfast (HMS Gadwall), Belfast, Northern Ireland, where it prepared for embarking on the Ruler-class escort carrier, HMS Begum for passage to the Pacific for operations with the British Pacific Fleet.

1701 Naval Air Squadron personnel and aircraft all embarked in HMS Begum on 17 April, and sailed from the Clyde, via Gibraltar, Suez Canal, Colombo and arrived at Manus Island in the Admiralty Islands. The squadron was divided into two flights of four aircraft; ‘B’ flight disembarked from HMS Begum on 28 May to RNAS Ponum (HMS Nabaron), Ponam Island, a former United States Navy airstrip transferred to the Royal Navy (RN) on loan, which was home to Mobile Naval Air Base No. IV (MONAB IV) to which the Flight became attached to providing air sea rescue duties.

On 15 June, ’A’ flight disembarked from HMS Begum to RNAS Maryborough (HMS Nabstock), Maryborough, Queensland Australia, which was where Mobile Naval Air Base No. VI (MONAB VI) was situated. Here the flight provided air sea rescue operations and also provided a detachment of two aircraft to RNAS Bankstown (HMS Nabberley), Sydney, New South Wales, Australia. On 1 November 'A' Flight left RNAS Maryborough for the final time, relocating to Transportable Aircraft Maintenance Yard No. 1 (TAMY 1) at RNAMY Archerfield (HMS Nabsford), Brisbane, Queensland, Australia, to prepare for redeployment to Hong Kong.

Following the surrender of Japan, RNAS Ponum, on Manus, was beginning to rundown to closure with everything preparing to move to Australia. On 3 October 1945 ‘B’ flight was embarked in the Ruler-class escort carrier HMS Reaper for Hong Kong. On 4 November 'A' Flight left Australia for Hong Kong to rejoin the rest of the squadron, embarked in the Attacker-class escort carrier HMS Striker. 'B' Flight disembarked from HMS Reaper on 13 October and 'A' Flight disembarked from HMS Striker on 16 November, to RNAS Kai Tak (HMS Nabcatcher), MONAB VIII, situated at Kai Tak Airport, Hong Kong, with the HQ flight having been established on 1 November. The airfield at Kai Tak was a joint Royal Navy / Royal Air Force (RAF) station, the RN (West) side of the station housed Mobile Naval Air Base No. VIII (MONAB VIII). Here the squadron reverted to second-line duties.

Between 17 - 31 December it provided a detachment in the Attacker-class escort carrier HMS Chaser. In April the following year the squadron received an Airspeed Oxford, a twin-engine multi-role training aircraft, and this was joined by a de Havilland Tiger Moth biplane trainer aircraft, in July. 1701 Naval Air Squadron disbanded on 27 August 1946, its Supermarine Sea Otter aircraft were absorbed into 721 Naval Air Squadron, the resident Fleet Requirements Unit, as an ASR flight.

== Aircraft flown ==
The squadron has operated a number of different aircraft types, including:

- Supermarine Sea Otter ABR.I air sea rescue aircraft (February 1945 - August 1946)
- Airspeed Oxford multi-role training aircraft (April - August 1946)
- de Havilland Tiger Moth trainer aircraft (July - August 1946)

== Naval air stations ==
1701 Naval Air Squadron operated from a single naval air station of the Royal Navy in the United Kingdom, many overseas and a number of escort carriers:

- Royal Maval Air Station Lee-on-Solent (HMS Daedalus), Hampshire, (1 February -17 April 1945)
- HMS Begum (17 April - 28 May 1945)
  - 'A' Flight:
    - - transit - (14 - 17 June 1945)
    - Royal Naval Air Station Maryborough (HMS Nabstock), Queensland, (17 June - 24 July 1945)
    - Royal Naval Air Station Bankstown (HMS Nabberley), Sydney, (24 July - 7 August 1945)
    - Royal Naval Air Station Maryborough (HMS Nabstock), Queensland, (7 August - 15 October 1945)
    - Royal Naval Air Station Bankstown (HMS Nabberley), Sydney, (15 - 21 October 1945)
    - Royal Naval Air Station Maryborough (HMS Nabstock), Queensland, (21 October - 1 November 1945)
    - Royal Naval Aircraft Maintenance Yard Archerfield (HMS Nabsford), Queensland, 1 - 4 November 1945)
    - HMS Striker (4 - 16 November 1945)
    - Royal Naval Air Station Kai Tak (HMS Nabcatcher), Hong Kong, (16 November 45 - 27 August 1946)
  - 'B' Flight:
    - Royal Naval Air Station Ponum (HMS Nabaron), Admiralty Islands, (28 May - 3 October 1945)
    - HMS Reaper (3 - 13 October 1945)
    - Royal Naval Air Station Kai Tak (HMS Nabcatcher), Hong Kong, (13 October 1945 - 27 August 1946)
- Royal Naval Air Station Kai Tak (HMS Nabcatcher), Hong Kong, (1 November 1945 - 27 August 1946)
  - HMS Chaser (Detachment 17 - 31 December 1945)
- disbanded - (27 August 1946)

== Commanding officers ==
List of commanding officers of 1701 Naval Air Squadron with date of appointment:

- Lieutenant(A) L.F. Plant, RNVR, from 1 February 1945
- Lieutenant(A) P.H. Woodham, DSC, RNVR, from 19 October 1945
- disbanded - 27 August 1946

Note: Abbreviation (A) signifies Air Branch of the RN or RNVR.
