= HMS Nabaron =

Mobile Operational Naval Air Base (MONAB) of the Royal Navy

HMS Nabaron Mobile Operational Naval Air Base IV
- on Ponam Island, Admiralty Islands, in the Manus Province in Papua New Guinea
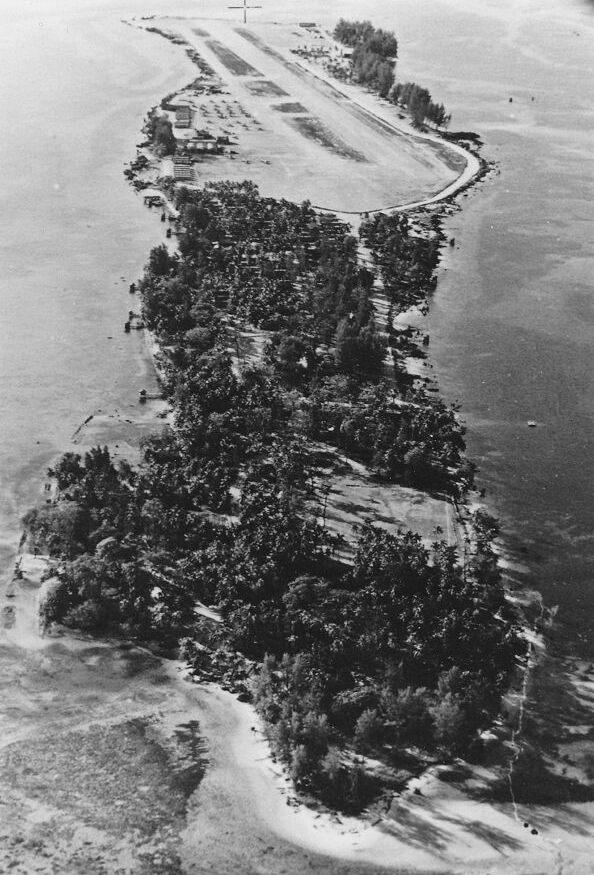
- Ponam island in 1944, with runway visible, location of MONAB IV

- Movere et Servire (Latin for 'We move to serve'); Unofficial, no official design approved

Site information
- Type: Mobile Operational Naval Air Base
- Owner: United States Navy
- Operator: Royal Navy
- Controlled by: Fleet Air Arm

Location
- Papua New Guinea
- Coordinates: 01°54′45″S 146°53′8″E

Site history
- In use: 1945 – 1945

Garrison information
- Garrison: MONAB IV
- Occupants: 721 Fleet Requirements Unit; 1701 Air Sea Rescue squadron 'B' Flight; Mobile Maintenance (MM) No. 3; Mobile Servicing (MS) No. 5; Mobile Servicing (MS) No. 6; Mobile, Storage & Reserve (MSR) No. 1; Mobile, Storage & Reserve (MSR) No. 4; Mobile, Storage & Reserve (MSR) No. 6; Mobile Annexe No. 1; Mobile Air Torpedo Maintenance Unit (MATMU) No. 7

Airfield information
- Elevation: 6 feet (1.8 m) AMSL
Runways
Direction	Length and surface
11/29	1,665 yards (1,522 m) x 50 yards (46 m) Crushed coral
- Source: Royal Navy Research Archive

HMS Nabaron was a Royal Navy (RN) Mobile Operational Naval Air Base (MONAB) which was situated at the United States Navy (USN) airfield NAS Ponam Airfield on Ponam Island, Admiralty Islands in Papua New Guinea, which had been transferred to RN on loan. HMS Nabaron was also known as MONAB IV and Royal Naval Air Station Ponam (or RNAS Ponam).

== History ==
The personnel and equipment for MONAB IV began to assemble at Royal Naval Air Station Ludham (HMS Flycatcher), Norfolk, on 15 November. This was to be a Type A MONAB (Small), which was required to support up to 50 aircraft. It was initially allocated Mobile Servicing (MS) No. 5 for Vought Corsair Mk. II & IV, Mobile Servicing (MS) No. 6 for Grumman Hellcat Mk. I & II, Mobile Maintenance (MM) No. 3 for Grumman Avenger Mk. I & II, Fairey Firefly Mk. I and Supermarine Seafire Mk. III & L.III and Mobile Annex (MA) No. 1.

MONAB IV was formed as an autonomous command on 1 January 1945, commissioned HMS Nabaron, Captain A.N.C. Bingley, OBE, RN, held command of the unit. By the middle of January, preparations for overseas deployment were complete, and on 16 January 1945, the unit's vehicles, equipment, and personnel were transported to Liverpool. The personnel boarded the troopship SS Dominion Monarch, while the stores and equipment were loaded onto the SS Clan Macaulay. On the 19, both ships sailed alongside convoy UC.53A.

They traversed the Panama Canal on 3 February, subsequently entering the Pacific Ocean, and reached Sydney, Australia on 21 February. The next day, the personnel were disembarked into tented accommodations at Warwick Farm Racecourse, which served as an extension of the Royal Navy Barracks at HMS Golden Hind. During its voyage to Australia, a decision was made to assign MONAB IV to operate the US Naval airfield located on Ponam Island in the Admiralty Islands. The decision resulted in MONAB IV being positioned in the forward area, which subsequently necessitated its role in offering reserve aircraft storage. To facilitate this storage capability, an additional component was incorporated, leading to the transfer of Mobile, Storage & Reserve (MSR) No. 4 from the resources of MONAB II located at RNAS Bankstown, Sydney.

A small advance contingent, comprising Mobile, Storage & Reserve (MSR) No. 4, was dispatched to Ponam aboard the aircraft repair ship and light aircraft carrier HMS Unicorn, which departed with the British Pacific Fleet (BPF) and reached its destination on 13 March. Subsequently, on 22 March, the Victualling Store Issue Ship (VSIS) Fort Edmonton arrived, delivering three months' worth of victualling supplies. The SS Clan Macaulay facilitated the unloading of these stores and equipment, while the main contingent arrived on 24 March aboard the SS Empire Arquebus. Additionally, HMS Nabaron was re-commissioned at RNAS Ponam on 2 April. HMS Nabaron commenced aircrew training on 30 April. HMS Fencer delivered two Grumman Avenger aircraft along with four additional aircrew members, marking the initial acquisition of reserve aircraft. By the conclusion of May, a total of forty reserve airframes had been obtained from the ferry carriers, and no aircraft-related issues had been reported by that time.

In May, there was an increase in flight operations at Ponam. On 28 May, HMS Begum arrived off the island, bringing with it 721 Naval Air Squadron, a Fleet Requirements unit (FRU) that operated Vultee Vengeance TT.IV target tug aircraft, as well as the 'B' Flight of the 1701 Naval Air Squadron, an Air-Sea Rescue (ASR) unit equipped with Supermarine Sea Otter amphibious aircraft. The primary role of the 721 Naval Air Squadron's target tugs was to serve as targets for fighter interception exercises and to tow drogues for air-to-air firing practice. Although 1701 'B' Flight remained stationed until the end of August, it did not have to conduct any rescue operations.

On 29 May, HMS Implacable reached Manus to commence a six-week preparation period, during which RNAS Ponam was utilized for Aerodrome Dummy Deck Landing (ADDL) training. On 31 May, the 1843 Naval Air Squadron's twenty-four Vought Corsair Mk IV aircraft disembarked from HMS Arbiter, remaining in the area until 25 June. Additionally, Mobile, Storage & Reserve (MSR) No. 6 disembarked from HMS Arbiter on 1 June to facilitate aircraft replenishment. This unit was equipped to service Fairey Firefly I, Supermarine Seafire F Mk III & L Mk III, and Supermarine Sea Otter aircraft. The reserve capacity of HMS Nabaron was able to accommodate one hundred aircraft. On 4 July, Captain Bingley, the commanding officer, fell ill and showed no signs of recovery. Consequently, on 17 July, he was airlifted to Australia for medical treatment at the Royal Naval Hospital in Herne Bay, Sydney. In the interim, command was temporarily transferred to Commander W.S. Thomas, DSO, RN. On 6 July, an additional element was introduced as Mobile Air Torpedo Maintenance Unit (MATMU) No. 7 disembarked from the SS Clan Chattan.

On 21 June, RN Forward Aircraft Pool No. 1 (FAP1) departed from HMS Pioneer and arrived at the NAS Pityilu Airfield. This airstrip was built by the United States Navy's 140th Naval Construction Battalion on Pityilu Island, located 22 miles (35 km) east of Ponam. Lodging facilities had been arranged for the RN Forward Aircraft Pool and an Air Train test flight, with FAP1 being administratively linked to MONAB IV. During June, the population on the island reached its peak. The crew of MONAB IV, which included two Mobile, Storage & Reserve units, comprised approximately 785 personnel. However, there was a necessity to accommodate an additional 930 officers and enlisted men from both the stationed and disembarked FAA squadrons. HMS Nabaron had a maximum capacity of 1,700 personnel. To address the overflow, temporary housing was established in the form of native-style reed huts located along the lagoon's periphery, which proved to be quite adequate for short-term lodging.

Victory over Japan Day (V-J Day) was commemorated on Ponam the day following its announcement. Due to Captain Bingley's unfitness for duty, Captain C.J. Blake, RN, arrived on 30 August to take command of MONAB IV. He was instructed to prepare RNAS Ponam for closure within one month and to facilitate the shutdown of the RN Forward Aircraft Pool No. I at NAS Pityilu Island in September. All reserve aircraft from the RN Forward Aircraft Pool No. I, located on Pityilu, were transferred to RNAS Ponam during September. Every opportunity was utilised to load aircraft and supplies onto ships heading back to Australia. An evacuation plan was established for October. On 26 September, Mobile, Storage & Reserve (MSR) No. 6 was loaded onto the escort carrier HMS Vindex. The escort carrier HMS Reaper arrived on 3 October to take on 'B' Flight of 1701 Naval Air Squadron, followed by HMS Unicorn, which arrived on 6 October to embark Mobile, Storage & Reserve (MSR) No. 4 for its return to Australia. The SS Empire Charmain arrived to collect the vehicles of Mobile Air Torpedo Maintenance Unit (MATMU) No. 7, departing for Sydney on 16 October. HMS Unicorn returned to RNAS Ponam on 24 October to load the remaining supplies and personnel. Finally, HMS Chaser arrived on 30 October to load equipment and two Supermarine Walrus aircraft, with both vessels departing for Australia on 31 October.

HMS Unicorn reached Sydney on 6 November, marking the dissolution of MONAB IV. Subsequently, on 9 November, the members of MONAB IV boarded the escort carrier HMS Slinger for their journey back to the United Kingdom, arriving just in time for the Christmas festivities.

== Commanding officers ==
List of commanding officers of HMS Nabaron with date of appointment:

- Captain A.N.C. Bingley, RN, from 1 January 1945
- Commander W.S. Thomas, RN, (temp CO) from 17 July 1945
- Captain C.J. Blake, RN, from 31 August 1945

== Units based at HMS Nabaron ==
List of units associated with MONAB IV, in support of disembarked front line Squadrons, the provision of reserve aircraft storage for the forward area, a fleet requirements unit and an Air-Sea rescue flight:

=== Function ===
- 721 Fleet Requirements Unit
- 1701 Air Sea Rescue Squadron 'B' Flight

=== Aviation support components ===
- Mobile Maintenance (MM) No. 3
- Mobile Servicing (MS) No. 5
- Mobile Servicing (MS) No. 6
- Mobile, Storage & Reserve (MSR) No. 1
- Mobile, Storage & Reserve (MSR) No. 4
- Mobile, Storage & Reserve (MSR) No. 6
- Mobile Annexe No. 1
- Mobile Air Torpedo Maintenance Unit (MATMU) No. 7

=== Aircraft type supported ===
- Grumman Avenger Mk.I & II
- Vought Corsair Mk II & IV
- Fairey Firefly I
- Grumman Hellcat F. Mk. I & II
- Stinson Reliant I
- Supermarine Seafire F Mk III & L Mk III
- Supermarine Sea Otter Mk I
- Vultee Vengeance TT Mk IV

== Squadrons at HMS Nabaron ==
List of Fleet Air Arm first and second line squadrons, station flight and other flying units either based at or disembarked to RNAS Nowra (HMS Nabaron) and MONAB IV:

=== Based squadrons ===
- Station Flight operated a number of Stinson Reliant aircraft for communication duties.
- 721 Fleet Requirements Unit disembarked from HMS Begum, on 30 May 1945 and was initially equipped with six Vultee Vengeance TT.IV. It embarked in HMS Unicorn on 9 October for passage to RNAMY Archerfield.
- 1701 Air Sea Rescue Squadron 'B' Flight disembarked from HMS Begum on 28 May 1945, equipped with three Supermarine Sea Otter. It embarked in HMS Reaper on 3 October.

=== Disembarked squadrons ===
==== Torpedo, Bomber, Reconnaissance Squadron ====
- 812 Naval Air Squadron was a Torpedo, Bomber, Reconnaissance Squadron. It was equipped with Fairey Barracuda Mk II and a detachment of six aircraft disembarked from HMS Vengeance between 28 – 30 August 1945.
- 828 Naval Air Squadron was a Torpedo, Bomber, Reconnaissance Squadron which was equipped with twenty-one Grumman Avenger Mk.I. It disembarked from HMS Implacable on 29 May 1945 and re-embarked on 9 June. A detachment of nine aircraft was also disembarked between 9 – 12 June 1945.

==== Fighter Squadron ====
- 801 Naval Air Squadron, a Fleet Fighter Squadron was equipped with Supermarine Seafire L Mk III and a detachment of six aircraft disembarked from HMS Implacable between 28 – 31 May 1945.
- 880 Naval Air Squadron was a Fleet Fighter Squadron which was equipped with twenty-four Supermarine Seafire, a mixture of F MK II and L MK III. A detachment of six aircraft disembarked from HMS Implacable between 28 – 31 May 1945. The squadron was also disembarked here between 21 – 28 June 1945.
- 885 Naval Air Squadron was a Fleet Fighter Squadron. It disembarked from HMS Ruler on 31 May 1945 and was equipped with twenty Supermarine Seafire, a mixture of F MK II and L MK III. It re-embarked on 17 June 1945. A detachment of twelve aircraft was disembarked between 19 – 28 June 1945.
- 1771 Naval Air Squadron a Two Seater Fighter Squadron detached seven aircraft from HMS Implacable here between 9 – 12 May 1945. It was equipped with Fairey Firefly I aircraft.
- 1841 Naval Air Squadron was a Fleet Fighter Squadron equipped with twenty Vought Corsair Mk IV. It disembarked from HMS Formidable between 18 – 19 August 1945.
- 1843 Naval Air Squadron was a Fleet Fighter Squadron equipped with twenty Vought Corsair Mk IV. It disembarked here from HMS Arbiter on 31 May 1945 and re-embarked on 25 June.
- 1850 Naval Air Squadron was a Fleet Fighter Squadron equipped with twenty Vought Corsair Mk IV. A detachment of twelve aircraft disembarked from HMS Vengeance between 23 – 30.

== Aircraft carriers disembarked from/embarked to ==
List of Royal Navy aircraft carriers that Royal Navy Fleet Air Arm squadrons disembarked from, or embarked in, at HMS Nabaron:

- HMS Arbiter
- HMS Begum
- HMS Formidable
- HMS Implacable
- HMS Reaper
- HMS Ruler
- HMS Unicorn
- HMS Vengeance
