= HMS Nabstock =

Mobile Operational Naval Air Base (MONAB) of the Royal Navy

HMS Nabstock Mobile Operational Naval Air Base VI
- at RAAF Maryborough, Maryborough, Queensland in Australia

Site information
- Type: Mobile Operational Naval Air Base
- Owner: Department of Defence
- Operator: Royal Navy (1945)
- Controlled by: Fleet Air Arm (1945)

Location
- Location in Queensland HMS Nabstock (Australia)
- Coordinates: 25°30′48″S 152°42′54″E

Site history
- In use: 1945 – 1945 (Fleet Air Arm)
- Fate: Returned to Royal Australian Air Force
- Battles/wars: World War II; Pacific War

Garrison information
- Garrison: MONAB VI
- Occupants: Flying units: 706 Pool & Refresher Flying Training Squadron; Support functions: Mobile Maintenance (MM) No. 5; Maintenance Servicing (MS) No. 9; Maintenance Servicing (MS) No. 10; Mobile Repair (MR) No. 2

Airfield information
- Elevation: 30 feet (9.1 m) AMSL
Runways
Direction	Length and surface
--/--	1,100 yards (1,006 m) x 50 yards (46 m) Bitumen
12/30	1,100 yards (1,006 m) x 50 yards (46 m) Bitumen
17/35	1,765 yards (1,614 m) x 50 yards (46 m) Bitumen
- Source: Royal Navy Research Archive

HMS Nabstock Mobile Operational Naval Air Base VI
- at RAAF Station Schofields, Schofields, Sydney, New South Wales in Australia

Site information
- Owner: Department of Defence
- Operator: Royal Navy
- Controlled by: Fleet Air Arm

Location
- Location within New South Wales HMS Nabstock (Australia)
- Coordinates: 33°42′49″S 150°52′16″E

Site history
- In use: 1945 – 1946
- Fate: Returned to Royal Australian Air Force

Garrison information
- Garrison: MONAB VI
- Occupants: Flying units: 702 Instrument Flying Training & Checking Squadron; Support functions: Mobile Maintenance (MM) No. 5; Maintenance Servicing (MS) No. 9; Maintenance Servicing (MS) No. 10; Mobile Repair (MR) No. 2

Airfield information
- Elevation: 50 feet (15 m) AMSL
Runways
Direction	Length and surface
04/24	1,335 yards (1,221 m) x 50 yards (46 m) unsealed gravel pavement
11/29	1,500 yards (1,372 m) x 50 yards (46 m) unsealed gravel pavement
15/33	1,665 yards (1,522 m) x 50 yards (46 m) unsealed gravel pavement
- Source: Royal Navy Research Archive

HMS Nabstock was a Royal Navy (RN), Mobile Operational Naval Air Base (MONAB) which was initially located at the Royal Australian Air Force (RAAF) airfield RAAF Maryborough situated in Maryborough, Queensland. HMS Nabstock was also known as MONAB VI and Royal Naval Air Station Maryborough (or RNAS Maryborough), between June and November 1945. It was decommissioned and moved to RAAF Station Schofields located at Schofields, New South Wales, where MONAB VI was recommissioned as HMS Nabstock and was known there as Royal Naval Air Station Schofields (or RNAS Schofields) until June 1946.

== History ==
On 1 March 1945, personnel and equipment for Mobile Naval Air Base VI commenced assembly at RNAS Middle Wallop (HMS Flycatcher), Hampshire, which served as the new headquarters for the Mobile Naval Airfields Organisation (MNAO). The allocations for this unit included Mobile Maintenance (MM) No. 5, Mobile Servicing (MS) Nos. 9 and 10, and Mobile Repair (MR) No. 2. Collectively, these components provided support for a range of aircraft, including Grumman Avenger Mk.I & II, Vought Corsair Mk II & IV, Grumman Hellcat F. Mk. I & II, Supermarine Seafire F Mk III & L Mk III, Vultee Vengeance TT.IV, Beech Expeditor, Miles Martinet TT.Mk I, and Supermarine Sea Otter Mk I.

Throughout the course of its operations, the MNAO acquired several insights, revealing that many of the challenges faced by the units assembling at RNAS Ludham would continue to be present at RNAS Middle Wallop. The formation program stipulated that the unit should finalize its assembly and be prepared for deployment overseas within a six-week timeframe. However, similar to the experiences of the five preceding units, MONAB VI discovered that this duration was inadequate for achieving successful formation and operational readiness.

MONAB VI was established as an independent command under the commission HMS Nabstock on 1 April 1945, with Captain H.V.P. McClintock, DSO, RN, at the helm. Following this, personnel from MONAB VI and MR No. 2 travelled to Greenock, located on the Clyde, to board their transportation vessel. They set sail for Sydney aboard the ocean liner converted to troopship SS Nieuw Amsterdam on 22 April. The necessary stores and equipment were distributed across three different vessels: the SS Trojan Star, the SS Empire Splendour, and the SS Empire Captain. The SS Nieuw Amsterdam proceeded independently to Australia, reaching Sydney on 23 May. Upon arrival, the personnel disembarked at Warwick Farm Racecourse, which was part of the RN Barracks in Sydney, HMS Golden Hind, where they awaited the assignment of an operational base.

=== RAAF Station Maryborough ===
The choice was made to designate RAAF Station Maryborough, Queensland, as the appropriate site for MONAB VI, given the unavailability of an alternative station. MONAB VI was officially commissioned as HMS Nabstock, Royal Naval Air Station Maryborough (RNAS Maryborough), on 1 June 1945, during a ceremony graced by the presence of Rear Admiral Sir Reginald Henry Portal, KCB, DSC, RN, the Flag Officer, Naval Air Pacific (FONAP).

'A' Flight from the 1701 Naval Air Squadron arrived on 17 June, deploying Supermarine Sea Otter amphibious aircraft that had disembarked from the escort carrier HMS Begum. Subsequently, on 23 June, 1845 Naval Air Squadron arrived from HMS Nabsford, location for the Transportable Aircraft Maintenance Yard (TAMY) I, at RNAMY Archerfield, Brisbane, where it had reformed with Vought Corsair Mk IV fighter aircraft. Following this, 1843 Naval Air Squadron arrived, bringing with it more Vought Corsair Mk IV, from the escort carrier HMS Arbiter. Both squadrons departed on 24 July, 1845 Naval Air Squadron headed for HMS Nabbington (MONAB I), while 1843 Naval Air Squadron proceeded to HMS Nabswick (MONAB V).

A contingent of Supermarine Seafire fighter aircraft from 899 Naval Air Squadron, the Seafire Operational Training Unit at HMS Nabthorpe (MONAB III) arrived at the station to conduct Deck Landing Training (DLT) for RAAF pilots. The pilots participated in their DLT sessions aboard the fleet carrier HMS Indomitable from 4 - 27 July.

After V-J Day, on 23 August, 1834 and 1836 Naval Air Squadrons, both equipped with Vought Corsair, along with 849 Naval Air Squadron, which operated Grumman Avenger, departed from HMS Victorious. The following day, the latter squadron proceeded to Mascot Airport in Sydney. On the 28, a new resident unit, 706 Naval Air Squadron, a Pool & Refresher Flying Training Squadron, was transferred from HMS Nabthorpe. Additionally, another unit, 1770 Naval Air Squadron, with Fairey Firefly, also arrived from HMS Nabthorpe, on the 29.

899 Naval Air Squadron returned to perform DLT with HMS Arbiter, thereby completing the second and final conversion course from the 10 to the 13 September. Meanwhile, personnel from 1834 and 1836 Naval Air Squadrons departed on the 25 to re-embark on HMS Victorious for their journey back to the UK, where they were scheduled to disband upon arrival. Additionally, 1770 Naval Air Squadron was disbanded at HMS Nabstock on the 30, leaving only 706 and 1701 Naval Air Squadrons remaining at RNAS Maryborough.

'A' Flight of 1701 Naval Air Squadron once more headed south to conduct operations from HMS Nabberley on 15 October, returning to HMS Nabstock on 21. Additionally, October marked the relocation of 706 Naval Air Squadron, which transferred to HMS Nabbington on the 24, with its operational capacity diminished to two aircraft of each type in service with the British Pacific Fleet. Flying operations were suspended at HMS Nabstock on 24 October.

HMS Nabstock was decommissioned at RNAS Maryborough on 15 November 1945, with the unit transferring its commission to RNAS Schofields, New South Wales, on that same date.

=== RAAF Station Schofields ===
RNAS Schofields was re-commissioned by MONAB VI under the designation HMS Nabstock on the same day. At that time, the base hosted 702 Naval Air Squadron, an Instrument Flying Training & Checking Squadron, alongside five disembarked squadrons: 801, 887, and 894 Naval Air Squadrons all equipped with Supermarine Seafire, as well as 1772 and 1790 Naval Air Squadrons utilising Fairey Firefly aircraft.

On 15 November, 887 Naval Air Squadron re-joined the aircraft carrier HMS Indefatigable, followed by 1772 Naval Air Squadron on 18 and 894 Naval Air Squadron on 23. All three squadrons successfully returned on 22 December, disembarking once more from HMS Indefatigable. Additionally, on New Year’s Eve, the aircraft carrier facilitated the deployment of the 820 Naval Air Squadron, equipped with Grumman Avenger, ashore.

In the New Year, 812 and 1850 Naval Air Squadrons arrived on 12 January 1946, having disembarked from HMS Vengeance. 1790 Naval Air Squadron boarded HMS Implacable on 16 January. Subsequently, on 18 January, the first of four squadrons arrived from HMS Nabbington as part of its gradual closure. This included on 1 January, 723 Naval Air Squadron, consisting of Miles Martinet and Vought Corsair aircraft, followed by 706 Naval Air Squadron, equipped with Grumman Avenger, Fairey Barracuda, Vought Corsair, Fairey Firefly, Grumman Hellcat, and Supermarine Seafire aircraft, on 18. 814 Naval Air Squadron, equipped with Fairey Firefly aircraft, arrived on 22 January and was followed by 1851 Naval Air Squadron on 24 January. Collectively, these latter two units formed the 15th Carrier Air Group (15th CAG) attached to HMS Venerable. On 31 January 820, 887, 894, and 1772 Naval Air Squadrons departed to rejoin HMS Indefatigable.

Subsequently, the 15th Carrier Air Group commenced its embarkation on HMS Venerable on 22 February, beginning with the departure of 1851 Naval Air Squadron. 814 Naval Air Squadron followed suit, departing on 13 March. Two days later, on 15, 801 Naval Air Squadron disembarked from HMS Implacable. The 13th Carrier Air Group left on 19, reuniting with HMS Vengeance, while 1790 Naval Air Squadron disembarked from HMS Implacable on 28 March.

At the beginning of April 1946, HMS Nabstock was the sole remaining Mobile Naval Air Base (MONAB) operational in Australia. During this period, it began to reduce its activities. The entirety of April and May was dedicated to dismantling the MONAB equipment and supplies, as well as preparing the airfield for its transfer back to the Royal Australian Air Force (RAAF).

The second-line squadrons, namely 706, 723, and 724 Naval Air Squadrons, were officially disbanded at HMS Nabstock on 31 May. Subsequently, HMS Nabstock and MONAB VI were decommissioned at RNAS Schofields on 9 June 1946, leading to the return of the airbase at Schofields to RAAF control.

== Commanding officers ==
List of commanding officers of HMS Nabstock with date of appointment:

- Captain H.V.P. McClintock, DSO, RN, from 1 April 1945

== Units based at HMS Nabstock ==
List of units associated with MONAB VI, in support of disembarked front line squadrons and refresher flying training:

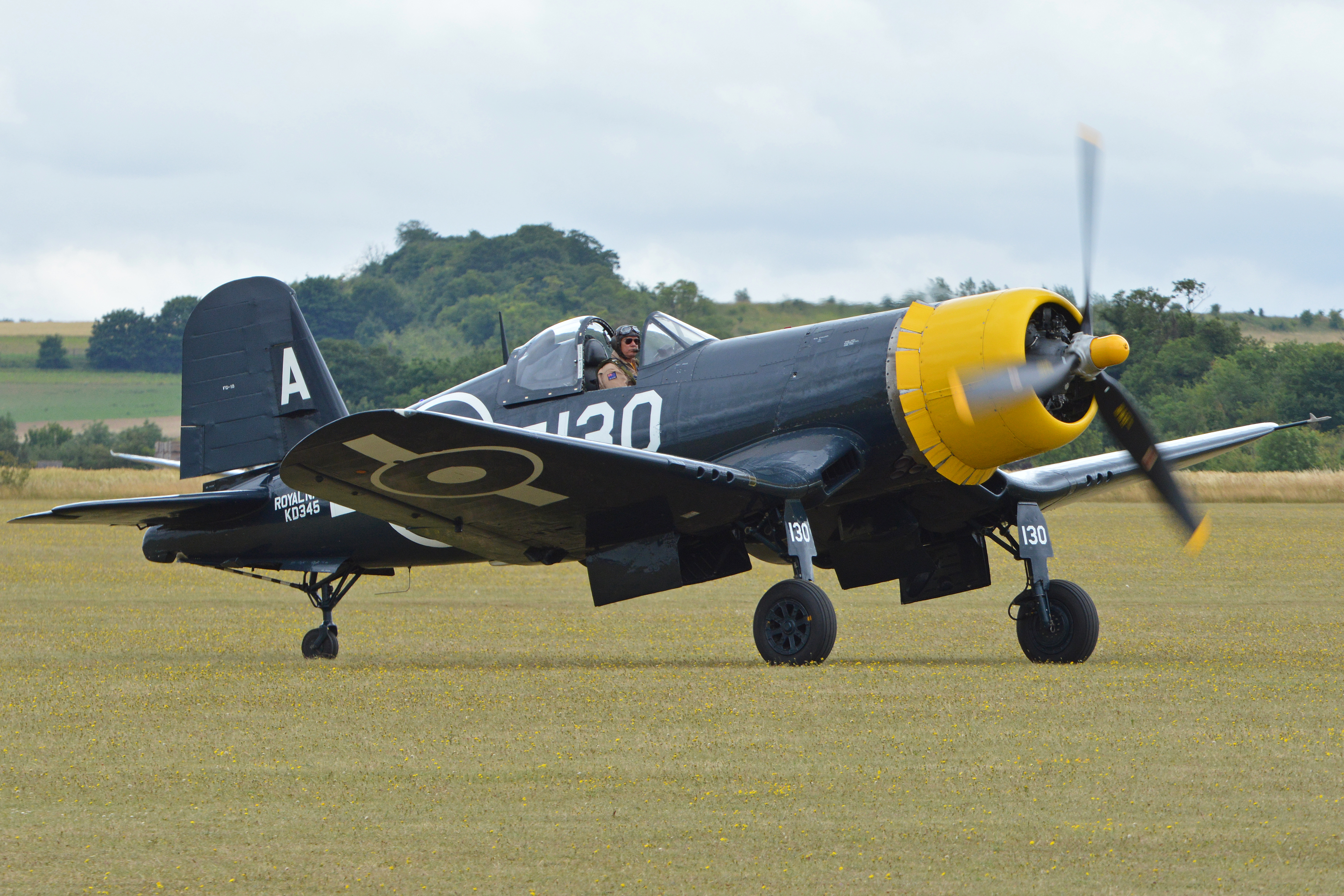
Goodyear FG-1D Corsair Mk VI ‘KD345 - 130-A’, in 1850 Squadron markings

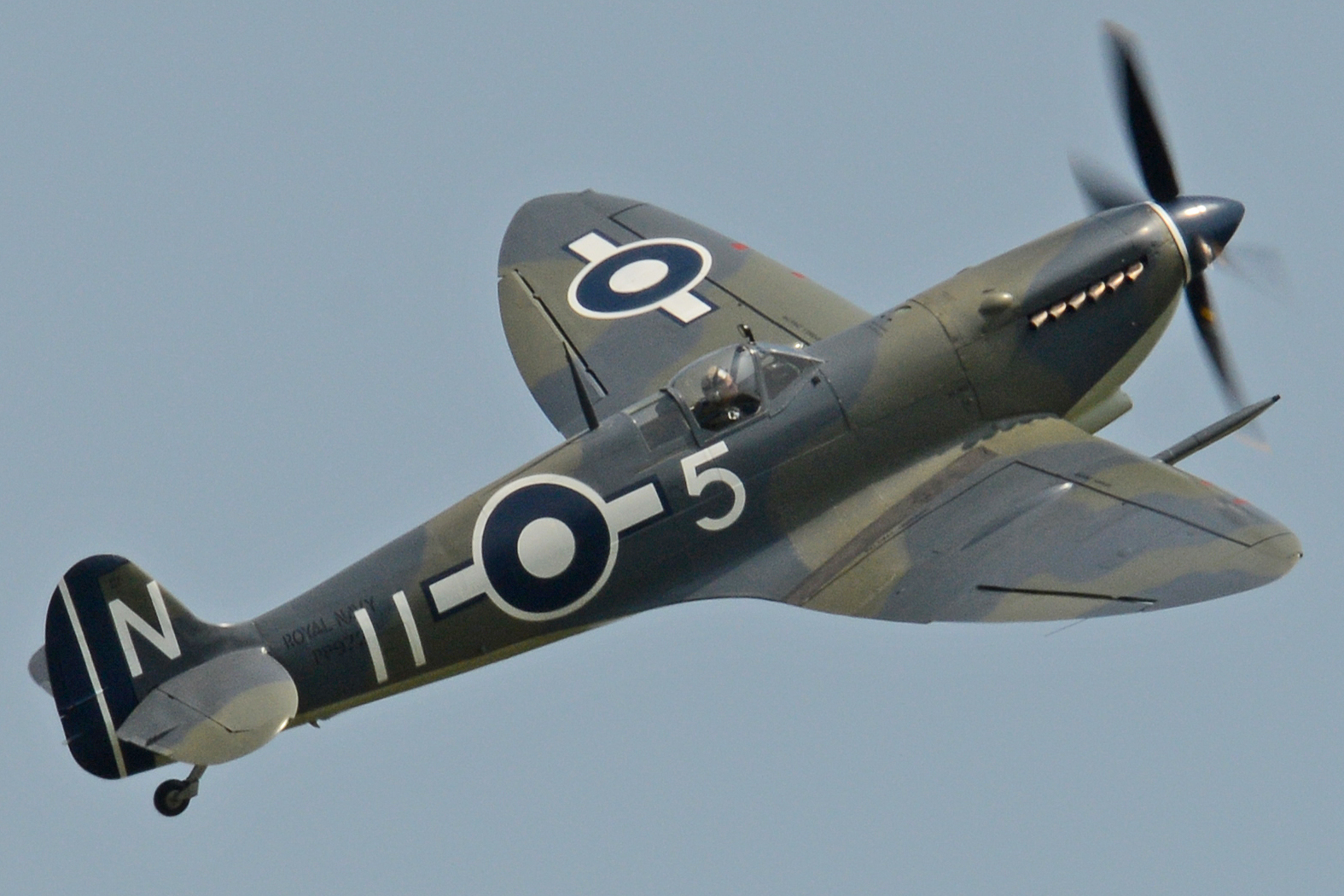
Supermarine Seafire L Mk IIIc ‘PP972 - 11-5 - N’ of the type at HMS Nabstock

=== Function ===
- Support for disembarked front line & spare squadrons
- 706 Pool & Refresher Flying Training Squadron

=== Aviation support components ===
- Mobile Maintenance (MM) No. 5
- Mobile Servicing (MS) No. 9
- Mobile Servicing (MS) No. 10
- Mobile Repair (MR) No. 2

=== Aircraft type supported ===
- Grumman Avenger Mk.I & II
- Vought Corsair Mk II & IV
- Beech Expeditor I
- Fairey Firefly I
- Grumman Hellcat F. Mk. I & II
- Miles Martinet TT.Mk I
- Supermarine Seafire F Mk III & L Mk III
- Supermarine Sea Otter Mk I
- Vultee Vengeance TT Mk.IV

== Squadrons at HMS Nabstock ==
List of Fleet Air Arm first and second line squadrons, station flight and other flying units either based at or disembarked to RNAS Maryborough (HMS Nabstock), RNAS Schofields (HMS Nabstock) and MONAB VI:

=== Based squadrons ===
==== Maryborough ====
- 706 Naval Air Squadron, a Crew Pool & Refresher Flying Training Squadron, moved to HMS Nabstock from RNAS Schofields (HMS Nabthorpe), MONAB III, on 28 August. It was equipped with Grumman Avenger, Fairey Barracuda, Vought Corsair, Fairey Firefly, Grumman Hellcat and Supermarine Seafire. It moved to RNAS Nowra (HMS Nabbington) on 24 October 1945.

==== Schofields ====
- 702 Naval Air Squadron, an Instrument Flying Training & Checking Squadron, was here when HMS Nabstock recommissioned, equipped with Airspeed Oxford and North American Harvard IIb. It later disbanded at Schofields on 10 September 1946.
- 706 Naval Air Squadron, a Crew Pool & Refresher Flying Training Squadron, moved here from HMS Nabbington on 18 January 1946 and disbanded here on 31 May.
- 723 Naval Air Squadron, a Fleet Requirements Unit, moved here from RNAS Nowra (HMS Nabbington) on 21 January 1946 and disbanded here on 31 May 1946. Equipped with Miles Martinet target tug aircraft and Vought Corsair fighter-bomber.
- 724 Naval Air Squadron, a Communications Squadron, moved here from RNAS Bankstown (HMS Nabberley) on 31 March 1946 and disbanded here on 31 May 1946. Equipped with Beech Expeditor and Avro Anson.

=== Disembarked squadrons ===
==== Maryborough ====
===== Air Sea Rescue Squadron =====
- 1701 Naval Air Squadron 'A' Flight, an Air Sea Rescue Squadron disembarked from HMS Begum on 17 June 1945. It was equipped with Supermarine Sea Otter, an amphibious air-sea rescue aircraft. It moved to RNAS Bankstown (HMS Nabberley) on 24 July returning on 7 August. It again flew to RNAS Bankstown on 15 October, returning on 21. It moved to RNAMY Archerfield (HMS Nabsford) on 1 November 1945.

===== Operational Training Unit =====
- 899 Naval Air Squadron, was an Operational Training Unit for Supermarine Seafire. Squadron detachments equipped with Supermarine Seafire L Mk III from RNAS Schofields (HMS Nabthorpe) arrived for Deck landing Training (DLT):
  - 4 - 27 July 1945 DLT HMS Indomitable
  - 15 August 1945 DLT HMS Arbiter
  - 10 - 13 September 1945 DLT HMS Arbiter

===== Torpedo, Bomber, Reconnaissance Squadron =====
- 849 Naval Air Squadron, a Torpedo, Bomber, Reconnaissance squadron disembarked from HMS Victorious on 23 September 1945, equipped with Grumman Avenger. Moved to Mascot (Sydney) on 24 September.

===== Fighter Squadrons =====
- 1770 Naval Air Squadron, a Two Seater Fighter Squadron equipped with Fairey Firefly I, moved from RNAS Schofields (HMS Nabthorpe) on 29 August 1945 and disbanded here on 20 September 1945.
- 1834 Naval Air Squadron which was a Single-Seat Fighter Squadron equipped with Vought Corsair Mk IV, disembarked from HMS Victorious on 23 August 1945 and its aircraft were withdrawn here. The squadron personnel then re-embarked in HMS Victorious on 25 September 1945.
- 1836 Naval Air Squadron which was a Single-Seat Fighter Squadron equipped with Vought Corsair Mk IV, disembarked from HMS Victorious on 23 August 1945 and its aircraft were withdrawn here. The squadron personnel then re-embarked in HMS Victorious on 25 September 1945.
- 1843 Naval Air Squadron, a Single-Seat Fighter Squadron, disembarked from HMS Arbiter on 4 June 1945. It was equipped with Vought Corsair Mk IV. The squadron moved to RNAS Jervis Bay (HMS Nabswick) on 14 July 1945.
- 1845 Naval Air Squadron, a Single-Seat Fighter Squadron, moved here from RNAMY Archerfield (HMS Nabswick) on 23 June 1945. It was equipped with Vought Corsair Mk IV. The squadron moved to RNAS Nowra (HMS Nabbington) on 14 July 1945.

==== Schofields ====
===== Torpedo, Bomber, Reconnaissance Squadrons =====
- 812 Naval Air Squadron was a Torpedo, Bomber, and Reconnaissance Squadron which disembarked from HMS Vengeance on 12 February 1946 and subsequently re-embarked on 19 March 1946. The squadron was equipped with Fairey Firefly aircraft.
- 814 Naval Air Squadron was designated as a Torpedo, Bomber, and Reconnaissance Squadron, having relocated from RNAS Nowra (HMS Nabbington) on 22 January 1946. The squadron embarked on HMS Venerable on 13 March and was initially equipped with Fairey Barracuda Mk II, later transitioning to Fairey Firefly.
- 820 Naval Air Squadron also served as a Torpedo, Bomber, and Reconnaissance Squadron, having disembarked from HMS Indefatigable on 31 December 1945. The squadron re-embarked on HMS Indefatigable on 31 January 1946 and was equipped with Grumman Avenger.

===== Fighter Squadrons =====
- 801 Naval Air Squadron, a Single-Seat Fighter Squadron initially equipped with Supermarine Seafire L Mk III later F Mk XVII. It disembarked from HMS Implacable on 9 September 1945 and re-embarked on 16 January 1946. It again disembarked from the same carrier on 15 March 1946 and re-embarked on 29 April.
- 887 Naval Air Squadron, a Single-Seat Fighter Squadron, disembarked from the aircraft carrier HMS Indefatigable on 22 December 1945 and subsequently re-embarked on 31 January 1946. The squadron was equipped with Supermarine Seafire L Mk III fighter aircraft.
- 894 Naval Air Squadron, was a Single-Seat Fighter Squadron which re-embarked on HMS Indefatigable on 23 November 1945. The squadron disembarked from the same vessel on 22 December 1945 and subsequently re-embarked on 31 January 1946. The squadron was equipped with Supermarine Seafire L Mk III fighter aircraft.
- 1772 Naval Air Squadron was a Two-Seater Fighter Squadron that re-embarked on HMS Indefatigable on 18 November 1945. The squadron disembarked from the ship on 22 December 1945 and re-embarked on 31 January 1946. The squadron was equipped with Fairey Firefly I aircraft.
- 1790 Naval Air Squadron was a Night Fighter Squadron which embarked on HMS Indefatigable on 16 January 1946. The squadron disembarked on 28 March 1946 and re-embarked on 29 April 1946. The squadron was equipped with Fairey Firefly INF aircraft.
- 1834 Naval Air Squadron, a single-seat fighter unit, disembarked from HMS Victorious between 5 and 26 June 1945 and was equipped with Vought Corsair Mk IV aircraft.
- 1836 Naval Air Squadron, also a single-seat fighter unit, disembarked from HMS Victorious during the same period of 5 to 26 June 1945, utilising Vought Corsair Mk IV for its operations.
- 1850 Naval Air Squadron, designated as a single-seat fighter squadron, disembarked from HMS Vengeance on 12 January 1946 and subsequently re-embarked on 19 March 1946, while operating Vought Corsair Mk IV.
- 1851 Naval Air Squadron, a single-seat fighter squadron, relocated from RNAS Nowra (HMS Nabbington) on 24 January 1946 and embarked on HMS Venerable on 22 February 1946, with Vought Corsair Mk IV as its primary aircraft.

== Aircraft carriers disembarked from/embarked to ==
List of Royal Navy aircraft carriers that Royal Navy Fleet Air Arm squadrons disembarked from, or embarked in, at HMS Nabstock:

- HMS Arbiter
- HMS Begum
- HMS Implacable
- HMS Indefatigable
- HMS Indomitable
- HMS Venerable
- HMS Vengeance
- HMS Victorious
