= 721 Naval Air Squadron =

Inactive flying squadron of the Royal Navy's Fleet Air Arm

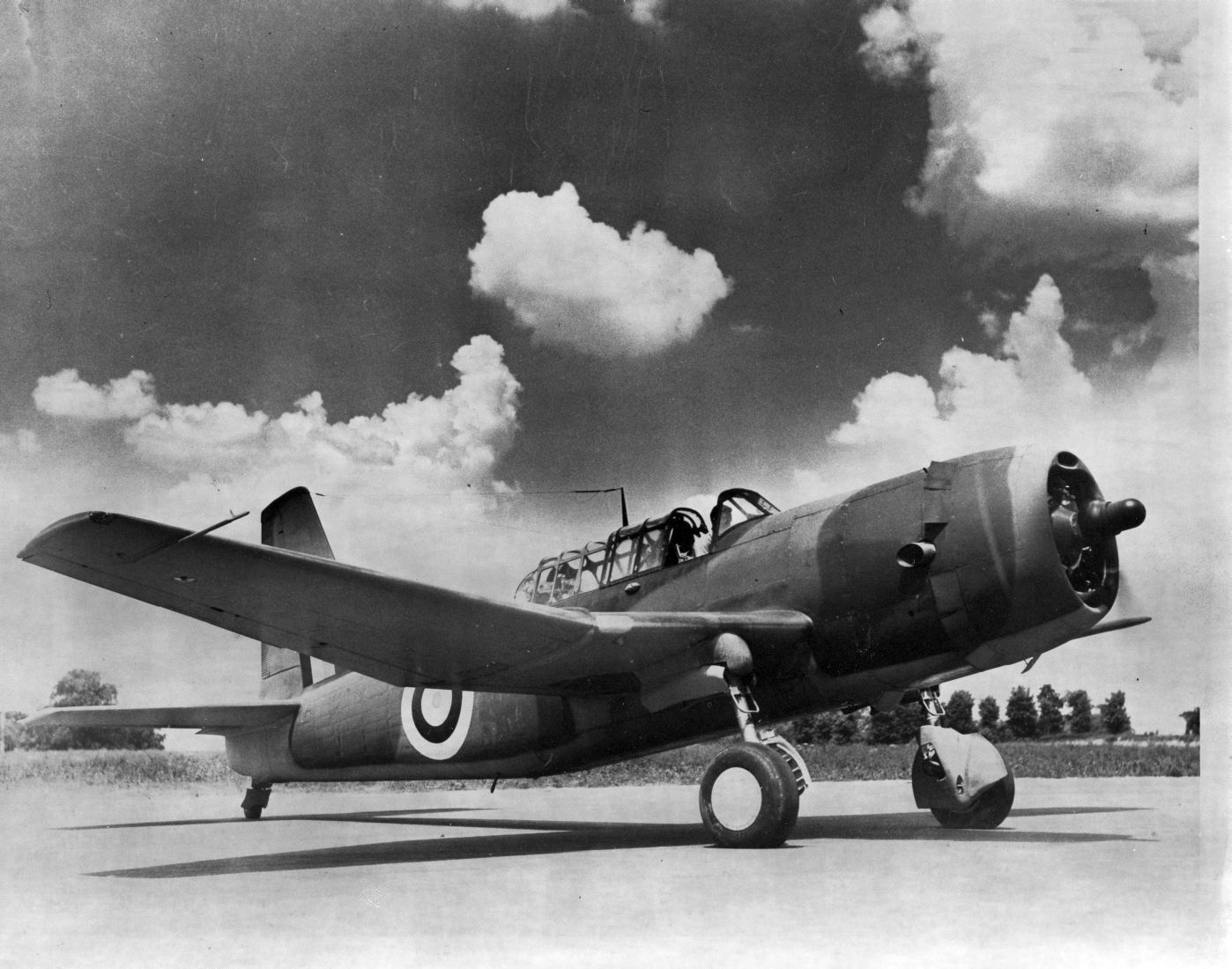
- Vultee Vengeance of the type used by 721 NAS
- Active: 1945–1947
- Disbanded: 31 December 1947
- Country: United Kingdom
- Branch: Royal Navy
- Type: Fleet Air Arm Second Line Squadron
- Role: Fleet Requirements Unit
- Size: Squadron
- Part of: Fleet Air Arm
- Home station: See Naval air stations section for full list.

Commanders
- Former commanders: See Commanding officers section for full list.

Insignia
- Identification Markings: Individual Letters

Aircraft flown
- Bomber: Vultee Vengeance
- Fighter: Vought Corsair; Supermarine Seafire
- Patrol: Supermarine Walrus; Supermarine Sea Otter
- Trainer: de Havilland Tiger Moth

721 Naval Air Squadron (721 NAS), sometimes referred to as 721 Squadron, is an inactive Fleet Air Arm (FAA) naval air squadron of the United Kingdom’s Royal Navy (RN). 721 Naval Air Squadron formed at RNAS Belfast, HMS Gadwall, Northern Ireland, at the beginning of March 1945, as a Fleet Requirements Unit for the British Pacific Fleet. Initially equipped with Vultee Vengeance target tugs, it arrived at RNAS Ponam, Admiralty Islands in May 1945, and commenced operations towing targets. The squadron moved to RNAS Archerfield, Brisbane, Australia, during October and then relocated to Hong Kong at the beginning of 1946, moving to HMS Nabcatcher, RNAS Kai Tak, where it eventually disbanded at the end of 1947.

== History ==
=== Fleet Requirements Unit (1945–1947) ===
721 Naval Air Squadron formed up at RNAS Belfast (HMS Gadwall) on 1 March 1945 as a Fleet Requirements Unit for operations in the Pacific. The squadron personnel consisted commanding officer Lieutenant Commander(A) F.A. Simpson, RNVR, six pilots and six Telegraphist Air Gunners. It was initially equipped with twelve Vultee Vengeance TT.IV, an American dive bomber aircraft modified as a target tug, six which were sent on the Ruler-class escort carrier, HMS Begum and the other six were used for aircraft familiarisation while at RNAS Belfast.

721 Fleet Requirements Unit personnel and aircraft all embarked in HMS Begum on 17 April, and sailed from the Clyde, via Gibraltar, Suez Canal, Colombo and arrived at Manus Island in the Admiralty Islands, the British Pacific Fleet's forward base. The squadron disembarked from HMS Begum on 28 May to RNAS Ponum (HMS Nabaron), Ponam Island, a former United States Navy airstrip transferred to the Royal Navy (RN) on loan, which was home to Mobile Naval Air Base No. IV (MONAB IV) and provided target towing duties.

On 9 October the squadron embarked in the aircraft repair ship and light aircraft carrier HMS Unicorn for passage to RNAMY Archerfield (HMS Nabsford), Archerfield airport, Brisbane. It arrived there on 15 October to re-equip and received twelve Vultee Vengeance target tug aircraft, six Boulton Paul Defiant, a fighter converted to target tug variant, nine Vought Corsair, an American carrier-borne fighter-bomber, two Grumman Avenger, an American torpedo bomber and a single North American Harvard, an American advanced trainer aircraft. At the end of 1945 it was decided that Hong Kong needed a resident Fleet Requirements Unit and the squadron embarked in the Ruler-class escort carrier HMS Speaker for passage to Hong Kong, on 28 December.

The squadron disembarked on 11 January 1946 to RNAS Kai Tak (HMS Nabcatcher), situated at Kai Tak Airport, Hong Kong. The airfield at Kai Tak was a joint Royal Navy / Royal Air Force (RAF) station, the RN (West) side of the station housed Mobile Naval Air Base No. VIII (MONAB VIII). Here, part of 721 Naval Air Squadron began working with RN Mobile Malaria Hygiene Unit No. 1 to eradicate the mosquito infestation from the colony. Three Vultee Vengeance TT.IVs, supplied by the Royal Australian Air Force (RAAF), were fitted for spraying the insecticide DDT. The Anti-Malarial Air Spraying Unit (AMASU), was an independent unit but relied upon the squadron for engineering and crew support.

Vought Corsair fighter-bomber aircraft arrived in June for Fleet Requirements Unit work, issued from the reserve stock at the airfield, these were followed by Supermarine Seafire, a navalised version of the Supermarine Spitfire fighter aircraft in November. The following month the squadron's 'B' Flight embarked in the Colossus-class aircraft carrier, HMS Glory for a period of time and notably this was the last FAA unit to operate Vought Corsair. On 27 August the squadron took over six Supermarine Sea Otter, an amphibious air-sea rescue aircraft and another RAAF de Havilland Tiger Moth, a biplane trainer aircraft, from the disbanding 1701 Naval Air Squadron and these form an air-sea rescue (ASR) flight. On the same day the airbase was reduced in status to RN Air Section Kai Tak. 721 Naval Air squadron disbanded at RN Air Section Kai Tak on 31 December 1947.

== Aircraft flown ==
The squadron has flown a number of different aircraft types, including:

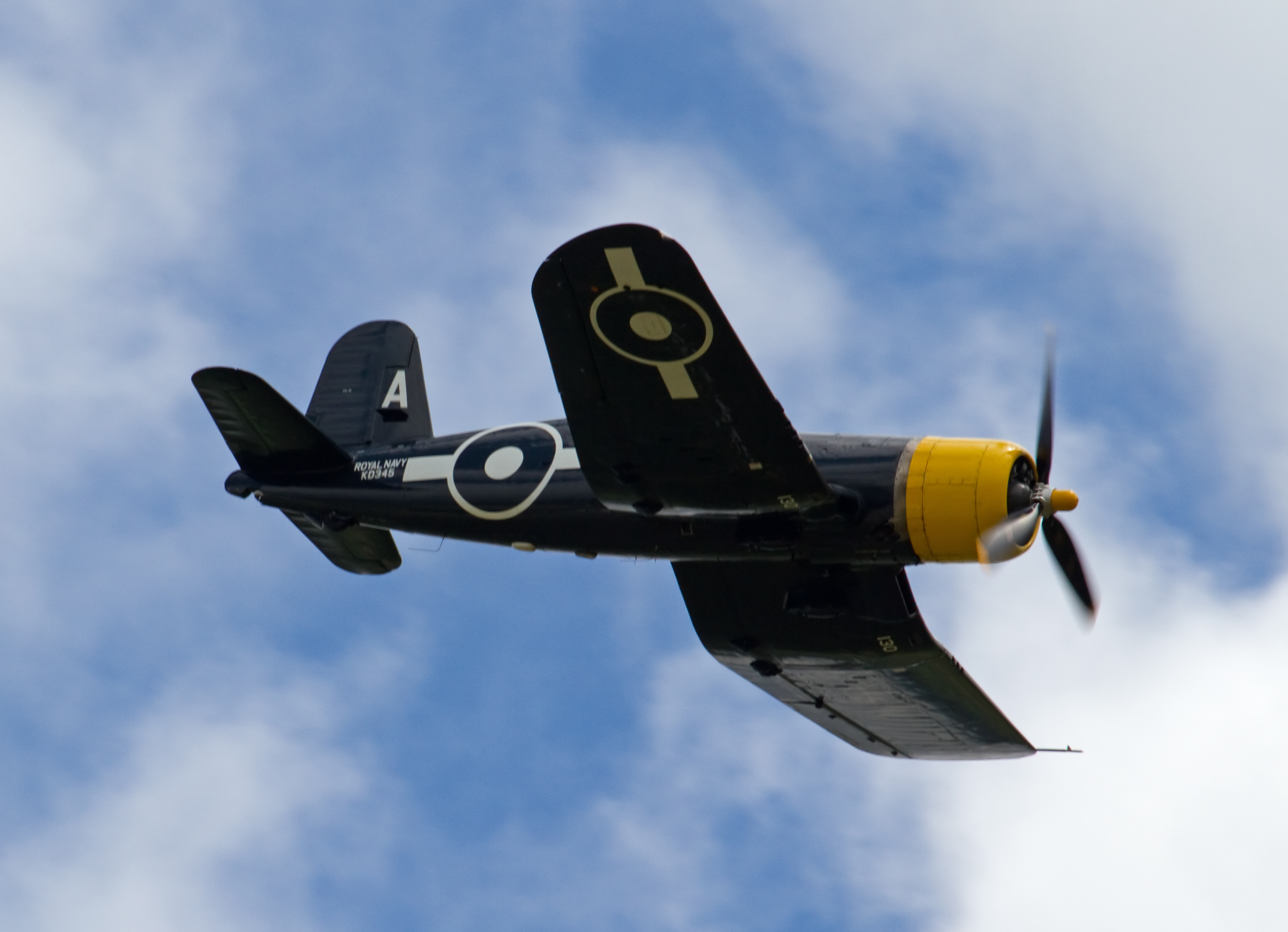
Vought Corsair Mk IV

- Vultee Vengeance TT.IV target tug (March 1945 - May 1947)
- Vultee Vengeance II dive bomber (April 1946 - May 1947)
- de Havilland Tiger Moth trainer aircraft (May - August 1946)
- Vought Corsair Mk IV fighter-bomber (June 1946 - September 1947)
- Supermarine Sea Otter MK I amphibious air-sea rescue aircraft (August 1946 - November 1947)
- Supermarine Sea Otter MK II amphibious air-sea rescue aircraft (August 1946 - November 1947)
- Supermarine Seafire F Mk XV fighter aircraft (November 1946 - November 1947)
- Supermarine Walrus amphibious maritime patrol aircraft (1946)

== Naval air stations ==
721 Naval Air Squadron operated from a naval air stations of the Royal Navy, in the United Kingdom, a number of escort carriers and airbases overseas:

- Royal Naval Air Station Belfast (HMS Gadwall), County Antrim, (1 March 1945 - 16 April 1945)
- HMS Begum, Ruler-class escort carrier, (16 April 1945 - 30 May 1945)
- Royal Naval Air Station Ponam (HMS Nabaron), Admiralty Islands, (30 May 1945 - 9 October 1945)
- HMS Unicorn, Maintenance aircraft carrier, (9 October 1945 - 15 October 1945)
- Royal Naval Aircraft Maintenance Yard Archerfield (HMS Nabsford), Queensland, (15 October 1945 - 28 December 1945)
- HMS Speaker, Ruler-class escort carrier, (28 December 1945 - 11 January 1946)
- Royal Naval Air Station Kai Tak (HMS Nabcatcher), Hong Kong, (11 January 1946 - 31 December 1947)
  - HMS Glory, Colossus-class aircraft carrier, ('B' Flight) (December 1946)
- disbanded - (31 December 1947)

== Commanding officers ==
List of commanding officers of 721 Naval Air Squadron with date of appointment:

- Lieutenant commander(A) F.A. Simpson, RNVR, from 1 March 1945
- Lieutenant J.L. Moore, RN, from 7 March 1946
- Lieutenant R.D. Head, DSC & Bar, RN, 19 November 1946
- disbanded - 31 December 1947

Note: Abbreviation (A) signifies Air Branch of the RN or RNVR.
