= 706 Naval Air Squadron =

Inactive flying squadron of the Royal Navy's Fleet Air Arm

- Squadron badge
- Active: 1945–1946; 1953–1954; 1962–1998
- Disbanded: 27 February 1998
- Country: United Kingdom
- Branch: Royal Navy
- Type: Fleet Air Arm Second Line Squadron
- Role: Crew Pool & Refresher Flying Training School; Anti-submarine helicopter squadron; Advanced Flying Training
- Size: Squadron
- Part of: Fleet Air Arm
- Home station: See Naval air stations section for full list.
- Mottos: Montez (French for 'Go upwards')
- Aircraft: See Aircraft flown section for full list.

Commanders
- Notable commanders: Lieutenant Commander(A) R.E. Bradshaw, DSC & Two Bars, RN

Insignia
- Squadron Badge Description: Blue, over water barry wavy of four white and blue a winged horse volant langued red wings addorsed and supporting between the forelegs a dagger point downward and piercing the water all gold (1979)
- Identification Markings: 780-787 (Whirlwind); 501-512 (Wessex / Wasp to July 1965); 566-599 (Wessex / Wasp / Sea King)
- Fin Shore Codes: GJ (Whirlwind); CU (Wessex / Wasp to July 1965); CU (Wessex / Wasp / Sea King); single letters ('B' Flight)

706 Naval Air Squadron (706 NAS), often referred to as 706 Squadron, is an inactive Fleet Air Arm (FAA) naval air squadron of the United Kingdom’s Royal Navy (RN). It most recently operated the Westland Sea King anti-submarine warfare helicopter between November 1969 and February 1998, based at RNAS Culdrose, Cornwall.

Established as a fighter and torpedo-bomber training unit in Australia at the end of World War Two, it was briefly reformed as a helicopter squadron in the early 1950s, before becoming a helicopter training unit in 1962, and operating until 1998.

== History ==
=== Crew Pool & Refresher Flying Training School (1945-1946) ===
The squadron was formed in the United Kingdom in January 1945 and sailed for Australia in February, arriving in March, where it was officially commissioned on 10 April 1945 at RNAS Schofields (HMS Nabthorpe), the name for MONAB III, which was installed at RAAF Station Schofields, near Schofields, New South Wales. The unit operated as a refresher training and conversion unit for the British Pacific Fleet. It operated with the American Grumman Avenger torpedo bomber, the British Fairey Barracuda torpedo and dive bomber, the American Vought Corsair fighter aircraft, the British Fairey Firefly fighter and anti-submarine aircraft, the American Grumman Hellcat fighter aircraft and the British Supermarine Seafire fighter aircraft. The squadron was equipped with thirty-six total aircraft, six of each of the operational types then in use with the British Pacific Fleet.

In late August, following the surrender of Japan, the squadron was transferred to MONAB VI or RNAS Maryborough (HMS Nabstock), which was located at Maryborough Airport at Maryborough, Queensland and in October moved again, this time to MONAB I, or RNAS Nowra (HMS Nabbington) which was located at Nowra, New South Wales. In January 1946 the unit returned to RNAS Schofields and later disbanded on 31 May 1946.

=== Anti-submarine helicopter squadron (1953-1954) ===
The squadron was reformed at RNAS Gosport (HMS Siskin), Hampshire, England, on 7 September 1953, as an anti-submarine helicopter squadron, flying the Westland Whirlwind HAS.22 anti-submarine warfare (ASW) helicopter and the Hiller HT.1, a light observation helicopter. In October 1953 it moved to Northern Ireland, firstly to RNAS Belfast (HMS Gannet III) located near the capital, Belfast, then in February 1954 it relocated to RNAS Eglinton (HMS Gannet), in County Londonderry, and being occasionally based aboard the Colossus-class light fleet carrier HMS Perseus. The squadron was disbanded on 1 March 1954, and its aircraft were transferred to 845 Naval Air Squadron.

=== Advanced Flying Training (1962-1998) ===
In January 1962 the squadron was reformed for a second time, as a helicopter training unit, at RNAS Culdrose (HMS Seahawk) for the Westland Wessex HAS.1 utility and anti-submarine warfare helicopter. It provided conversion courses to the new type and gave advanced training to specialist pilots. Later, on 7 January 1964, 706 Squadron's 'B' Flight was formed at RNAS Culdrose and was equipped with both Westland Wessex and Hiller HT.2, to operate in the Commando Assault role, but this was incorporated into 845 Naval Air Squadron when it arrived in Borneo to take part in the Indonesia–Malaysia confrontation. In November 1964 the squadron received Westland Wasp HAS.1 anti-submarine warfare helicopter for advanced training, and the following month 706 Squadron took over type conversion from 829 Naval Air Squadron.

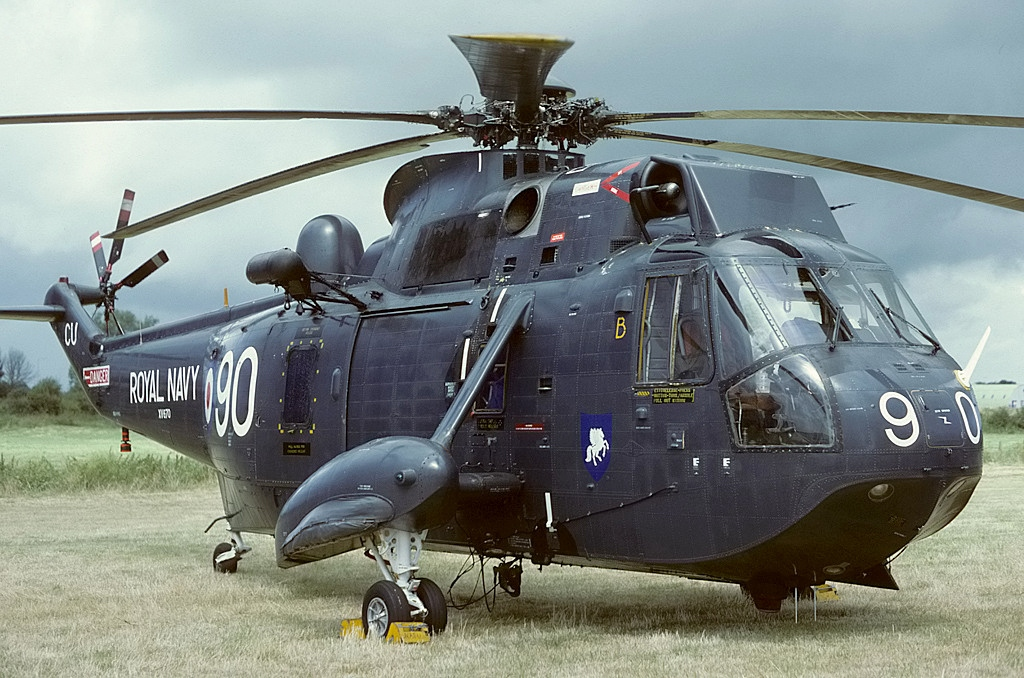
Westland Sea King HAS2, of 706 Squadron, RNAS Culdrose

In January 1970 the squadron converted to the Westland Sea King HAS.1 anti-submarine warfare helicopter and in February 1975 the Westland Wasp training was transferred to 703 Naval Air Squadron. Between February and December 1978 the squadron operated a Royal Fleet Auxiliary Trials Flight in conjunction with the replenishment oiler RFA Fort Grange, this Flight then moved to 824 Naval Air Squadron on completion.

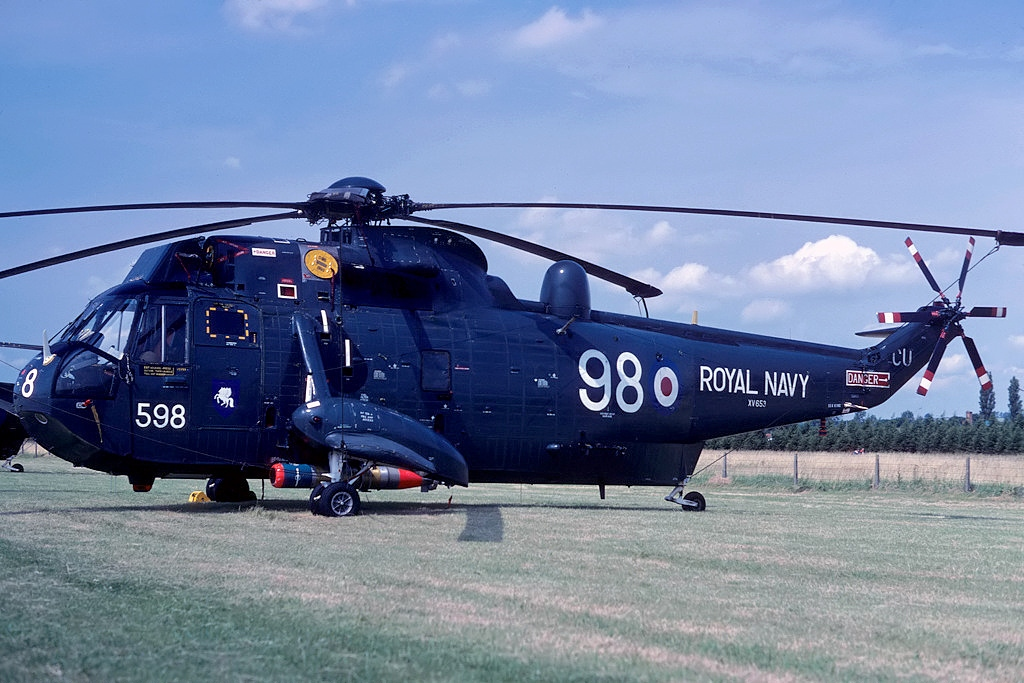
A Westland Sea King HAS2 of 706 Squadron at RNAS Culdrose

From February 1978 until April 1993 it was administrative host for the Royal Air Force's Sea King Training Unit. The squadron was a Westland Sea King conversion and advanced training squadron for pilots and maintainers, from 1976. The squadron continued with Westland Sea King flying training with 13 airframes and sea training was conducted aboard the Royal Fleet Auxiliary's helicopter support ship RFA Engadine.

In May 1982 it was the foundation of the formation of 825 Naval Air Squadron for deployment in the Falklands War. From October 1985 through to May 1996 it added Observer and Aircrewmen Advanced Flying Training. 706 Naval Air Squadron disbanded on 27 February 1998, with the remaining training being taken on by 810 Naval Air Squadron.

== Aircraft flown ==
The squadron operated a variety of different aircraft and versions:

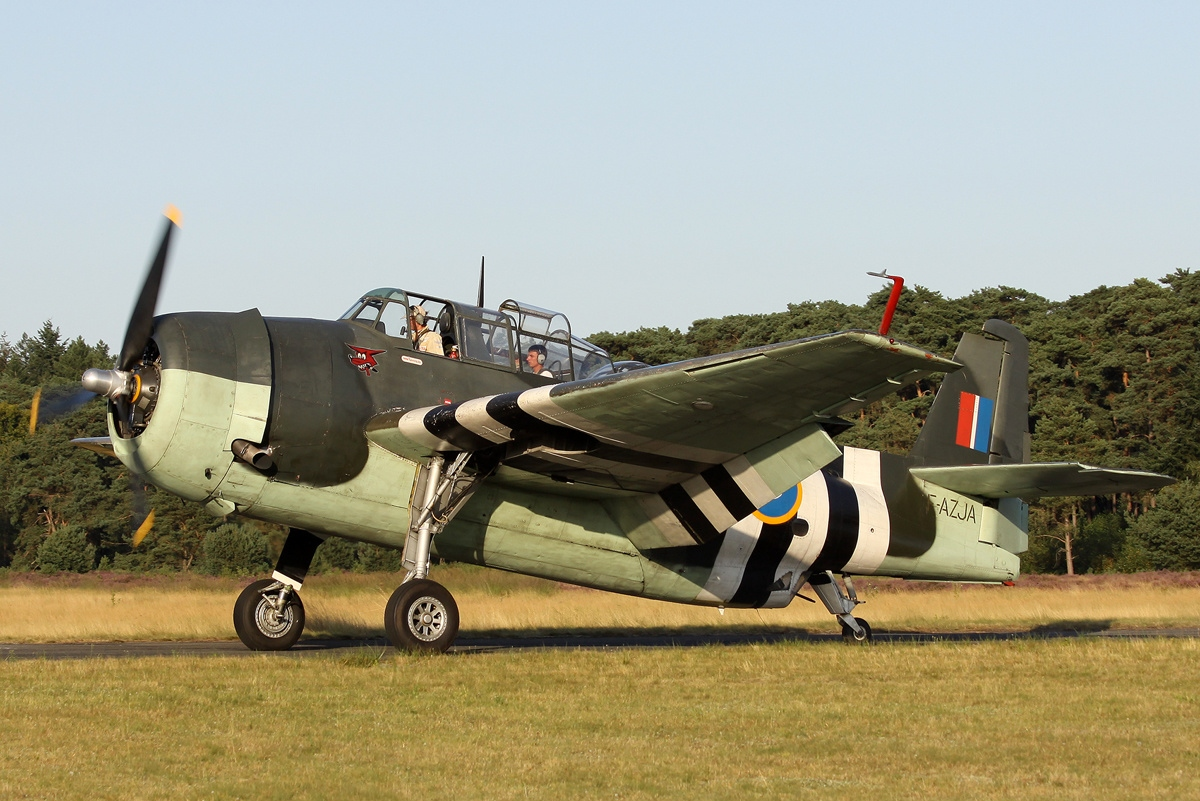
Grumman Avenger

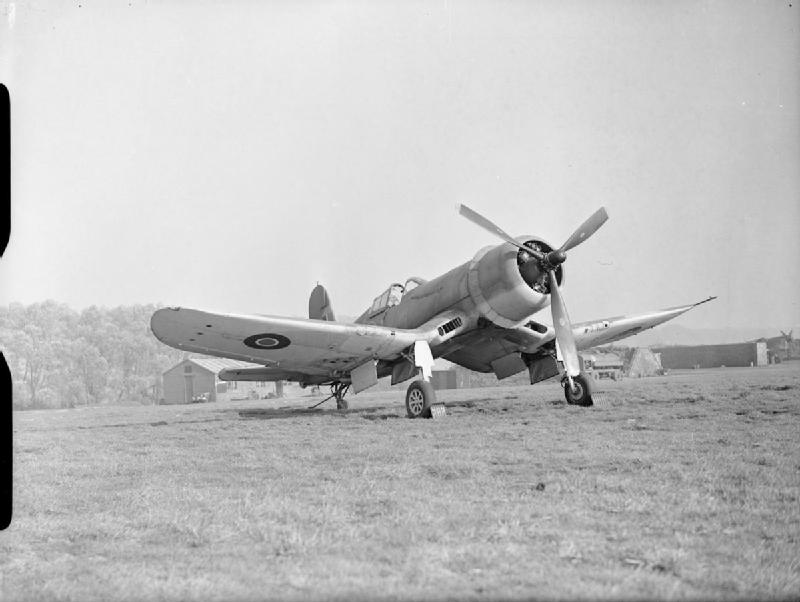
Chance-Vought Corsair

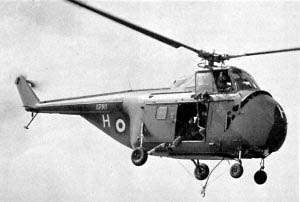
Westland Whirlwind

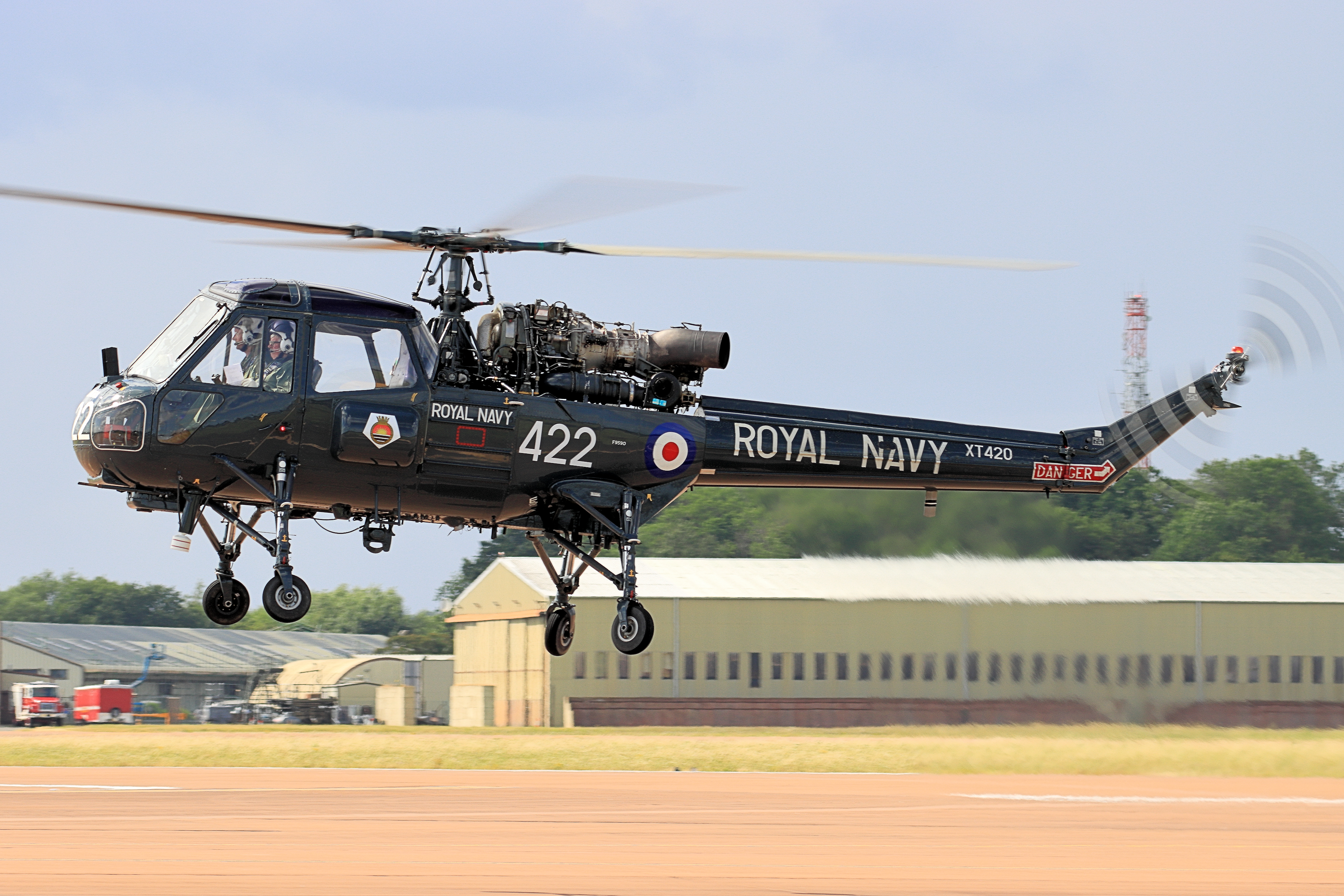
Westland Wasp HAS.1

- Grumman Tarpon GR.I torpedo bomber (March - October 1945)
- Grumman Avenger Mk.II torpedo bomber (March - September 1945)
- Vought Corsair Mk II fighter-bomber (March - December 1945)
- Grumman Hellcat F. Mk. I fighter aircraft (March - September 1945)
- Supermarine Seafire F Mk.III carrier based fighter aircraft (March - November 1945)
- Fairey Barracuda Mk II torpedo and dive bomber (August 1945 - March 1946)
- Fairey Firefly I fighter and anti-submarine aircraft (November 1945 - January 1946)
- Grumman Avenger Mk.III torpedo bomber (November 1945 - March 1946)
- Vought Corsair Mk IV fighter-bomber (December 1945 - March 1946)
- Grumman Hellcat F. Mk. Il fighter aircraft (December 1945 - February 1946)
- Supermarine Seafire F Mk.XV fighter aircraft (1946)
- Westland Whirlwind HAS.22 anti-submarine warfare helicopter (September 1953 - March 1954)
- Hiller HT.1 multipurpose light helicopter (September - October 1953)
- Westland Wessex HAS.1 anti-submarine warfare helicopter (January 1962 - February 1971)
- Westland Wasp HAS.1 anti-submarine warfare helicopter (November 1964 - December 1974)
- AH-12A Wasp (January - April 1967, January - March 1968)
- Westland Wessex HAS.3 anti-submarine warfare helicopter (July 1967 - June 1971)
- Westland Sea King HAS.1 anti-submarine warfare helicopter (November 1969 - (November 1978)
- Westland Sea King HAS.2 anti-submarine warfare helicopter (June 1978 - February 1985)
- Westland Sea King HAR.3 search and rescue helicopter (October 1979 - January 1982)
- Westland Sea King HAS.5 anti-submarine warfare helicopter (January 1981 - May 1982, April 1984 - February 1998)
- Westland Sea King HAS.6 anti-submarine warfare helicopter (July 1994 - February 1998)

=== 706B Flight ===
- Hiller HT.2 multipurpose light helicopter (January - March 1963)
- Westland Wessex HAS.1 anti-submarine warfare helicopter (January - March 1963)

== Naval air stations and other airbases ==
706 Naval Air Squadron operated from a number of naval air stations of the Royal Navy and Royal Air Force stations, in the United Kingdom and overseas:

1945 - 1946

- Royal Naval Air Station Jervis Bay (HMS Nabswick), Jervis Bay Territory, (6 March 1945 - 16 April 1945)
- Royal Naval Air Station Schofields (HMS Nabthorpe), New South Wales, (16 April 1945 - 28 August 1945)
- Royal Naval Air Station Maryborough (HMS Nabstock), Queensland, (28 August 1945 - 24 October 1945)
- Royal Naval Air Station Nowra (HMS Nabbington), New South Wales, (24 October 1945 - 18 January 1946)
- Royal Naval Air Station Schofields (HMS Nabthorpe), New South Wales, (18 January 1946 - 31 May 1946)
- disbanded (31 May 1946)

1953 - 1954

- Royal Naval Air Station Gosport (HMS Siskin), Hampshire, (7 September 1953 - 29 October 1953)
  - Chickerell, Dorset, (Detachment two aircraft 19-23 October 1953)
- Royal Naval Air Station Eglinton (HMS Gannet), County Londonderry, (29 October 1953 - 17 November 1953)
  - Royal Naval Air Station Belfast (HMS Gannet III), County Antrim, (Detachment four aircraft 30 October - 17 November 1953)
- Royal Naval Air Station Belfast (HMS Gannet III), County Antrim, (17 November 1953 - 20 January 1954)
- HMS Perseus, Colossus-class light fleet carrier, (20 January 1954 - 9 February 1954)
- Royal Naval Air Station Belfast (HMS Gannet III), County Antrim, (9 February 1954 - 10 February 1954)
- Royal Naval Air Station Eglinton (HMS Gannet) (10 February 1954 - 1 March 1954)
- Royal Naval Air Station Gosport (HMS Siskin), Hampshire, (1 March 1954 - 15 March 1954)
- disbanded (became 845 Naval Air Squadron 15 March 1954)

1962 - 1998

- Royal Naval Air Station Culdrose (HMS Seahawk), Cornwall, (4 January 1962 - 27 February 1998)
- disbanded - (27 February 1998)
- List of detachments between 1962-1998:
  - Royal Naval Air Station Yeovilton (HMS Heron), Somerset, (Detachment six helicopters 28 May - 6 June 1962)
  - HMS Dartmouth, Devon, (Detachment twelve helicopters 2 - 13 September 1963)
  - HMS Centaur, Centaur-class light fleet carrier, (Detachment one helicopter 20 - 26 November 1963)
  - Royal Naval Air Station Yeovilton (HMS Heron), Somerset, (Detachment ten helicopters 21 - 29 May 1964)
  - HMS Dartmouth, Devon, (Detachment ten helicopters 18 - 27 September 1964)
  - HMS Lofoten, Landing Ship, Tank, (Deck Landing Training 2 February 1965)
  - Royal Air Force Valley, Anglesey, (Detachment two helicopters 12 - 14 April, 31 May - 3 June 1965)
  - HMS Lofoten, Landing Ship, Tank, (Deck Landing Training 29 June 1965)
  - Lanveoc,Brittany, France, (Detachment three helicopters 18 - 20 September 1965)
  - Lanveoc, Brittany, France, (Detachment four helicopters 8 - 11 July 1966)
  - HMS Lofoten, Landing Ship, Tank, Deck Landing Training 17 October 1967)
  - Lanveoc, Brittany, France, (Detachment four aircraft 13 - 17 July 1967)
  - Royal Air Force Valley, Anglesey, (Detachment two helicopters 23 - 25 October, 5 - 8 December 1967)
  - Lanveoc, Brittany, France, (Detachment four helicopters 17 - 20 May, 19 - 22 July 1968, 30 May - 2 June, 18 - 21 July 1969)
  - Royal Air Force Valley, Anglesey, (Detachment three helicopters 2 - 6 June 1970)
  - Lanveoc, Brittany, France, (Detachment two helicopters 15 - 19 June 1972)
  - Royal Air Force Biggin Hill, London, (Detachment one helicopter 16 - 21 May 1973)
  - Schleswig Air Base, Schleswig-Holstein, Germany, (Detachment one helicopter 6 - 9 July 1973)
  - Royal Naval Air Station Yeovilton (HMS Heron), Somerset, (Detachment two helicopters 6 - 9 September 1975)
  - Jersey Airport, Jersey, (Detachment two helicopters 30 July - 1 August 1976)
  - Royal Naval Air Station Yeovilton (HMS Heron), Somerset, (Detachment two helicopters 3 - 5 September 1976)
  - De Kooy Airfield, Den Helder, Netherlands, (Detachment three helicopters 20 - 24 September 1976)
  - Lanveoc, Brittany, France, (Detachment two helicopters 1 - 4 April 1977)
  - Royal Naval Air Station Yeovilton (HMS Heron), Somerset, (Detachment five helicopters 24 - 28 June 1977)
  - Royal Air Force Wyton, Cambridgeshire, (Detachment two helicopters 22 - 25 July 1977)
  - Jersey Airport, Jersey, (Detachment two helicopters 28 - 31 July 1977)
  - Royal Naval Air Station Yeovilton (HMS Heron), Somerset, (Detachment four helicopters 1- 4 September 1977)
  - Royal Naval Air Station Lee-on-Solent (HMS Daedalus), Hampshire, (Detachment two helicopters 12 - 14 October 1977)
  - RFA Fort Grange, Fort Rosalie-class replenishment ship, (Detachment one helicopter 24 February - 6 December 1978)
  - Jersey Airport, Jersey, (Detachment two helicopters 14 - 17 July 1978)
  - Royal Naval Air Station Prestwick (HMS Gannet), Ayrshire, (Detachment two helicopters 22 - 25 September 1978)
  - Royal Naval Air Station Yeovilton (HMS Heron), Somerset, (Detachment two helicopters 10 - 14 November 1978)
  - RFA Engadine, helicopter support ship, (Detachments (March 1973 - April 1983)
  - Royal Naval Air Station Prestwick (HMS Gannet), Ayrshire, (Detachment one helicopter 4 - 8 July 1980)
  - Guernsey Airport, Guernsey, (Detachment three helicopters 24 - 27 April 1981)
  - Royal Naval Air Station Prestwick (HMS Gannet), Ayrshire, (Detachment two helicopters June - July, five helicopters September, three helicopters November - December 1982)
  - Guernsey Airport, Guernsey, (Detachment two helicopters 20 - 23 May 1983)
  - Lanveoc, Brittany, France, (Detachment two helicopters 24 - 27 June 1983)
  - Royal Naval Air Station Portland, Dorset, (Detachment one helicopter 14 - 23 September 1983)
  - Guernsey Airport, Guernsey, (Detachment two helicopters 23 - 26 September 1983, 9 - 12 March 1984)
  - Royal Naval Air Station Prestwick (HMS Gannet), Ayshire, (Detachment one helicopter 19 - 26 April 1984)
  - RFA Reliant, helicopter support ship, (Detachment two helicopters 5 - 7 November 1984)
  - Guernsey Airport, Guernsey, (Detachment three helicopters 7 - 10 May 1985)
  - Lann-Bihoué, Brittany, France, (Detachment two helicopters 11 - 14 June 1985)
  - Cork Airport, Cork, Ireland, (Detachment four helicopters 23 - 26 June, Detachments July 1985)
  - Lanveoc, Brittany, France, (Detachment two helicopters 23 - 26 July 1985)
  - Royal Naval Air Station Yeovilton (HMS Heron), Somerset, (Detachment two helicopters 2 - 5 August 1985)
  - Royal Naval Air Station Lee-on-Solent (HMS Daedalus), Hampshire, (Detachment one helicopter 9 - 13 September 1985)
  - Guernsey Airport, Guernsey, (Detachment three helicopters 27 - 29 September 1985)
  - Royal Naval Air Station Portland, Dorset, (Detachment two helicopters 2 - 5 December 1985)
  - Ronaldsway Airport, Isle of Man, (Detachment three helicopters January 1986)
  - Lann-Bihoué, Brittany, France, (Detachment two helicopters 13 - 16 June 1986)
  - Royal Naval Air Station Portland, Dorset, (Detachment three helicopters 21 - 25 July 1986)
  - Kiel Airport, Kiel, Germany, (Detachment one helicopter September 1986)
  - Guernsey Airport, Guernsey, (Detachment three helicopters 3 - 6 October 1986)
  - Royal Naval Air Station Portland, Dorset, (Detachment two helicopters 20 - 21 October 1986)
  - HMS Dartmouth, Devon, (Detachment three helicopters 19 - 20 January 1987)
  - Royal Naval Air Station Portland, Dorset, (Detachment two helicopters 26 - 29 January 1987
  - RFA Fort Grange, Fort Rosalie-class replenishment ship, (Detachment two helicopters 13 - 16 February 1987)
  - Guernsey Airport, Guernsey, (Detachment three helicopters 20 - 23 March 1987)
  - Koksijde Air Base, Koksijde, Belgium, (Detachment two helicopters 6 - 7 March 1987)
  - Guernsey Airport, Guernsey, (Detachment three helicopters 2 - 5 October 1987)
  - Witz (Detachment one helicopter 10 - 13 July 1987)
  - Kiel Airport, Kiel, Germany, (Detachment two helicopters 25 - 28 March 1988)
  - North Weald Airfield, Essex, (Detachment two helicopters 13 - 16 May 1988)
  - Farnborough Airport, Hampshire, (Detachment one helicopter 30 August - 8 September 1988)
  - Bordeaux–Mérignac Airport, Bordeaux, France, (Detachment two helicopters 23 - 26 September 1988)
  - Guernsey Airport, Guernsey, (Detachment two helicopters 30 September - 3 October 1988)
  - Orleans, France, (Detachment two helipcopters 30 March - 2 April 1990)
  - Kiel Airport, Kiel, Germany, (Detachment two helicopters 11 - 16 March 1992)
  - Koksijde Air Base, Koksijde, Belgium, (Detachment one helicopter 2 - 5 July 1992)
  - Royal Air Force Gütersloh, North Rhine-Westphalia, Germany, (Detachment two helicopters 25 - 28 September 1992)
  - Royal Air Force Laarbruch, North Rhine-Westphalia, Germany, (Detachment two helicopters 27 - 30 November 1992)
  - Ronaldsway Airport, Isle of Man, (Detachment one helicopter 8 - 11 March 1996)
  - Valkenburg Naval Air Base, Katwijk, Netherlands, (Detachment two helicopters 19 - 21 March 1996)
  - Koksijde Air Base, Koksijde, Belgium, (Detachment one/two helicopters 5 - 9 July, October 1996)

=== 706B Flight ===
- Royal Naval Air Station Culdrose (HMS Seahawk), Cornwall, (7 January 1964 - 8 March 1964)
  - Royal Naval Air Station Portland (HMS Osprey), Dorset, (Detachment two aircraft 5-6 February 1964)
- HMS Bulwark, Centaur-class light fleet aircraft carrier, (8 March 1964 - 26 March 1964)
- disbanded (absorbed into 845 Naval Air Squadron 26 March 1964)

== Commanding officers ==
List of commanding officers of 706 Naval Air Squadron, with date of appointment:

1945 - 1946

- Lieutenant Commander(A) R.E. Bradshaw, DSC & Two Bars, RN, from 6 March 1945
- Lieutenant Commander(A) D.M.R. Wynne-Roberts, RN, from 31 August 1945
- Lieutenant Commander(A) C.A. Fraser, RN, from 22 October 1945
- disbanded - 31 May 1946

1953 - 1954

- Lieutenant Commander H. Phillips, RN, from 7 September 1953
- disbanded - 15 March 1954

1962 - 1998

- Lieutenant Commander R.A. Duxbury, RN, from 4 January 1962
- Lieutenant Commander C.R.V. Doc, RN, from 30 July 1963
- Lieutenant Commander J.E. Kelly, RN, from 7 October 1963
- Lieutenant Commander C.R.V. Doc, RN, from 19 March 1965
- Lieutenant Commander M.J. Harvey, RN, from 14 September 1966
- Lieutenant Commander D.J.A. Bridger, RN, from 18 September 1968
- Lieutenant Commander V.G. Sirett, RN, from 24 June 1970 (Commander 1 October 1971)
- Lieutenant Commander G.W. Barras, RN, from 15 October 1971
- Lieutenant Commander H.C. Foster, RN, from 6 June 1973
- Lieutenant Commander M.P. Clark, RN, from 29 January 1975
- Lieutenant Commander N.B. Shaw, RN, from 15 March 1976
- Lieutenant Commander T.W. Loughran, RN, from 8 October 1976
- Lieutenant Commander R.C. Swales, RN, from 23 September 1977
- Lieutenant Commander R.E. Wilkinson, RN, from 23 October 1978
- Lieutenant Commander D.R. Warren, RN, from 17 April 1980
- Lieutenant Commander H.S. Clark, RN, from 12 August 1981
- Lieutenant Commander I.C. Domoney, RN, from 4 May 1982
- Lieutenant Commander H.S. Clark, DSC, RN, from 27 September 1982
- Lieutenant Commander I. Stanley DSO, RN, from 20 October 1983
- Lieutenant Commander R.G. Harrison, RN, from 7 June 1985
- Lieutenant Commander T. Jane, RN, from 1 April 1987
- Lieutenant Commander N.J. Hennell AFC, RN, from 20 September 1989
- Lieutenant Commander O.M.C. Dismore, RN, from 17 February 1993
- Lieutenant Commander S.M. Steeds, RN, from 1 February 1996
- disbanded - 27 February 1998

=== 706B Flight ===
Commanding officer of B Flight, 706 Naval Air Squadron, with date of appointment:

- Lieutenant Commander B.C. Sarginson, RN, from 7 January 1964
- absorbed into 845 Naval Air Squadron on 26 March 1964

Note: Abbreviation (A) signifies Air Branch of the RN or RNVR.
