= HMS Nabsford =

Transportable Aircraft Maintenance Yard (TAMY) of the Royal Navy

HMS Nabsford Transportable Aircraft Maintenance Yard I
- at RAAF Station Archerfield, in Brisbane, Queensland in Australia

Site information
- Type: Transportable Aircraft Maintenance Yard
- Owner: Department of Defence
- Operator: Royal Navy (1945-1946)
- Controlled by: Fleet Air Arm (1945-1946)

Location
- Location within Queensland HMS Nabsford (Australia)
- Coordinates: 27°34′10″S 153°00′28″E

Site history
- In use: 1945–1946 (Fleet Air Arm)
- Battles/wars: World War II; Pacific War

Garrison information
- Garrison: TAMY I
- Occupants: Mobile Repair (MR) No. 3; Mobile, Storage & Reserve (MSR) No. 7; Mobile, Storage & Reserve (MSR) No. 8

Airfield information
- Elevation: 50 feet (15 m) AMSL
Runways
| Direction | Length and surface |
|---|---|
| 00/18 | 1,878 yards (1,717 m) grass |
| 04/22 | 2,230 yards (2,039 m) grass |
| 10/28 | 2,000 yards (1,829 m) grass |
- Source: Royal Navy Research Archive

HMS Nabsford was a Royal Navy (RN), Transportable Aircraft Maintenance Yard (TAMY), which was situated at the Royal Australian Air Force (RAAF) airfield RAAF Station Archerfield in Brisbane, Queensland, Australia. HMS Nabsford was also known as TAMY I and Royal Naval Aircraft Maintenance Yard Archerfield (or RNAMY Archerfield).

== History ==
Transportable Aircraft Maintenance Yard No. I (TAMY I) was assembled in the United Kingdom at Royal Naval Air Station (RNAS) Ludham (HMS Flycatcher), Norfolk and Royal Naval Aircraft Training Establishment (RNATE) Risley (HMS Gosling), Lancashire, beginning on 4 December 1944. On 1 February 1945, TAMY I was officially commissioned as a RN Air Maintenance Yard, as HMS Nabsford, with Commander B.J.L. Rogers-Tillstone, RN, serving as the commanding officer.

On 16 February, personnel from TAMY I journeyed by rail and road to Gladstone Docks in Liverpool in preparation for their voyage to Australia. The primary contingent of TAMY I, consisting of twenty-three officers and 1,191 ratings, departed for Australia aboard the SS Stirling Castle on 18 February. A subsequent group, which included eight officers and ninety-one ratings, set sail on the RMS Empress of Scotland on 10 March.

The initial contingent on the SS Stirling Castle arrived on 27 March and was subsequently transported to Archerfield Airport, where it was commissioned as HMS Nabsford, the Royal Naval Aircraft Maintenance Yard Archerfield. As the facility expanded, it incorporated numerous other installations. Rocklea Camp functioned as the administrative and accommodation hub for the yard. Engine and ancillary workshops were located at Rocklea Factory, while spare parts were stored at Runcorn. The dismantling operations aimed at converting airframes and engines into spare components were conducted at Benedict Stone Works. Archerfield served as the airfield, and the aircraft assembly, inspection, repair, radio, and gunnery workshops were situated on Kerry Road.

On 1 June, 1845 Naval Air Squadron was re-established at RNAMY Archerfield as a single-seat fighter squadron, equipped with twenty-four Vought Corsair Mk IV fighter-bomber aircraft. The squadron relocated to the newly formed MONAB VI at RNAS Maryborough (HMS Nabstock) on the 23.

The initial output objectives for TAMY I in its first month, April, comprised: fifteen comprehensive inspections, twenty-five minor inspections and adjustments, twenty-five aircraft assemblies, and twenty-five engine refurbishments. However, only four Vought Corsair aircraft were assembled. The principal factors contributing to the completion of only fifty percent of the erection program in May were deficiencies in workshop equipment and spare parts. In June, the erection of Supermarine Seafires was not undertaken due to the absence of available aircraft. The production of Vought Corsair aircraft was impeded by the need to replace eleven engines. In July, the production of Supermarine Seafire aircraft encountered delays caused by a set of incompatible mainplanes, while the reduction in Vought Corsair production was linked to a shortage of spare parts. The month of August saw a deceleration in activities following the celebrations of V-J Day. (see table below)

The Fleet Requirements Unit from HMS Nabaron MONAB V, 721 Naval Air Squadron, was aboard the aircraft repair ship and light aircraft carrier HMS Unicorn. They reached Brisbane, Queensland, on 15 October, after which the squadron disembarked at HMS Nabsford, RNAMY Archerfield to re-organise.

'A' Flight of 1701 Naval Air Squadron, specialising in air-sea rescue (ASR), was transferred from RNAS Maryborough (HMS Nabstock) on 1 November 1945. The unit was equipped with Supermarine Sea Otter aircraft, which were designed for amphibious air-sea rescue operations. However, its duration at this location was brief, as it boarded the escort carrier HMS Striker on 4 November for passage to RNAS Kai Tak, Hong Kong.

On 5 November, HMS Nabreekie, MONAB VII, was officially decommissioned. Personnel from the MONAB who were not reassigned to other units or returned to the United Kingdom, were incorporated into the accounts of HMS Nabsford, where they were organised into Mobile Repair (MR) No. 3.

721 Naval Air Squadron was allocated a number of aircraft, which included Vultee Vengeance, Vought Corsair and de Havilland Tiger Moth. Over the preceding two months, the squadron was stationed at RNAMY Archerfield, where it engaged in preparations and testing of its aircraft. It was earmarked as a Fleet Requirements Unit at Hong Kong. The squadron embarked on HMS Speaker on 28 December.

In February 1946, the ship's crew was diminished as around 1,000 personnel were repatriated to the United Kingdom through the Royal Navy Barracks in Sydney. On 31 March 1946, HMS Nabsford and the Royal Navy Air Maintenance Yard at Archerfield were decommissioned.

== Commanding officers ==
List of commanding officers of HMS Nabsford with date of appointment:

- Commander B.J.L. Rogers-Tillstone, RN, from 1 February 1945 (Captain from 1 July 1945)

== Units based at HMS Nabsford ==
List of units associated with TAMY I, in support of an Aircraft Maintenance Yard:

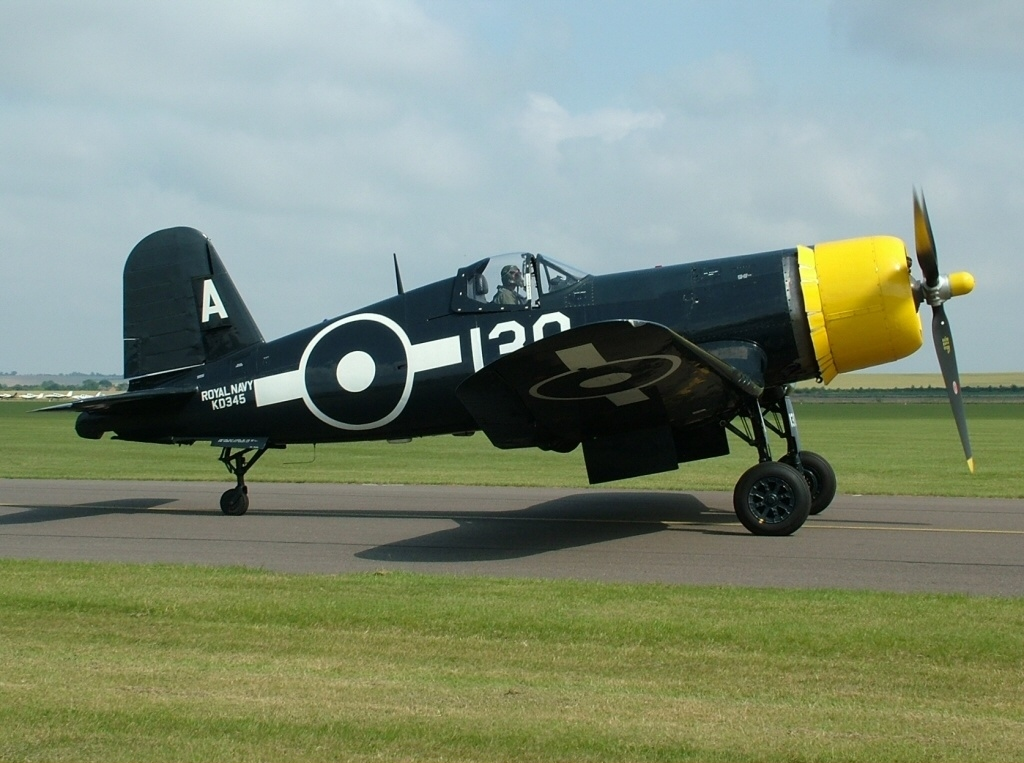
Goodyear FG-1D Corsair. A Fleet Air Arm Corsair Mk IV of the type erected and inspected at RNAMY Archerfield

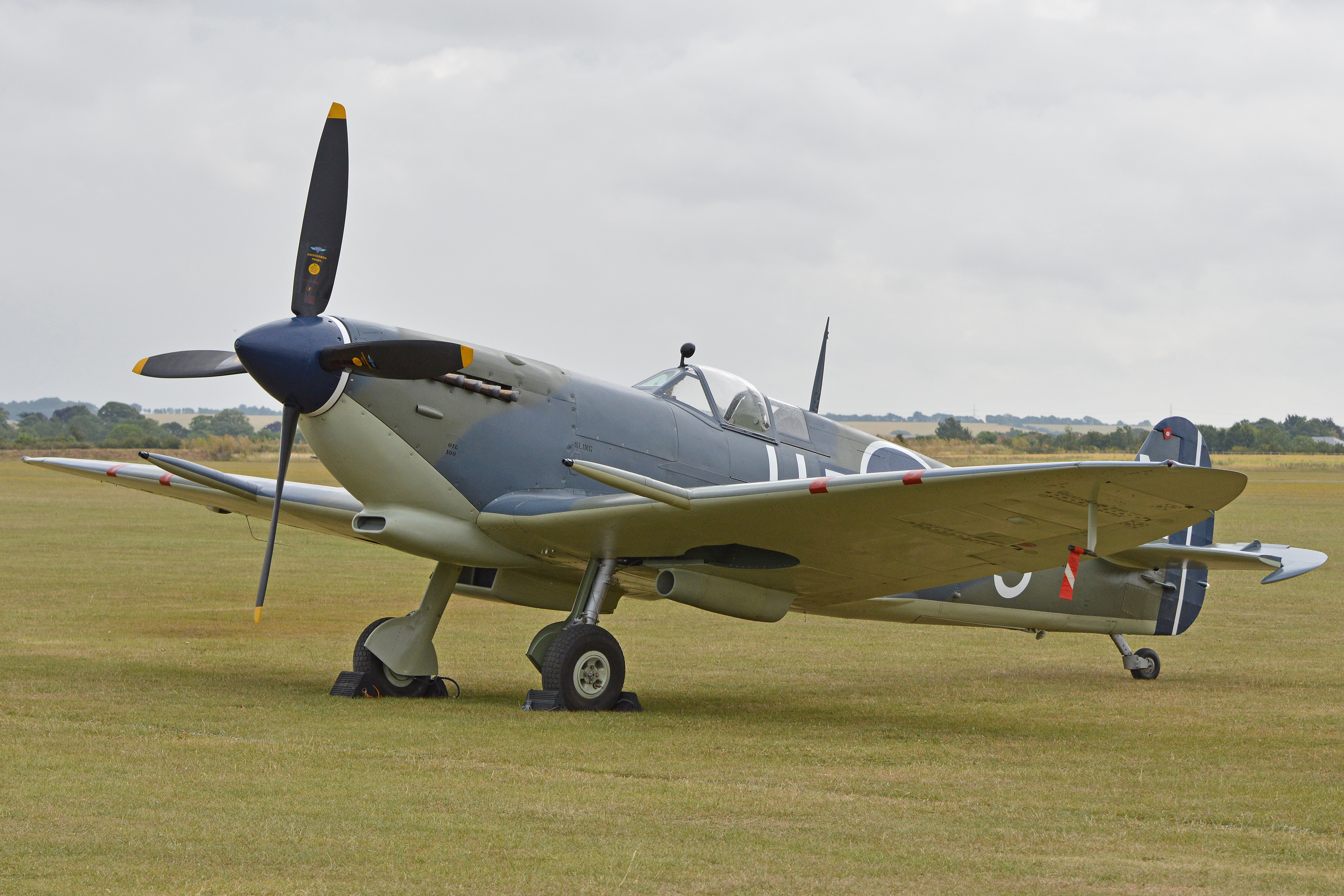
Supermarine Seafire L Mk III, of the type erected and inspected at RNAMY Archerfield

=== Function ===
- Aircraft Maintenance Yard

=== Aviation support components ===
- Mobile Repair (MR) No. 3
- Mobile, Storage & Reserve (MSR) No. 7
- Mobile, Storage & Reserve (MSR) No. 8

=== Aircraft type supported ===
- Grumman Avenger Mk.I & II
- Fairey Barracuda Mk II
- Vought Corsair Mk II & IV
- Beech Expeditor II
- Fairey Firefly I
- Grumman Hellcat F. Mk. I & II
- Miles Martinet TT.Mk I
- Stinson Reliant
- Supermarine Seafire F Mk III & L Mk III
- Supermarine Sea Otter I
- de Havilland Tiger Moth I
- Vultee Vengeance TT. Mk IV

== Squadrons at HMS Nabsford ==
List of Fleet Air Arm first and second line squadrons, station flight and other flying units either based at or disembarked to RNAMY Archerfield (HMS Nabsford) and TAMY I:

- 721 Naval Air Squadron, a Fleet Requirements Unit, disembarked here from HMS Unicorn to re-organize and re-arm at RNAMY Archerfield on 15 October 1945. It was issued with Vultee Vengeance target tug aircraft, Vought Corsair, Supermarine Sea Otter and de Havilland Tiger Moth training aircraft. It embarked in HMS Speaker on 28 December 1945.
- 1701 Naval Air Squadron's air-sea rescue (ASR) 'A' Flight relocated from RNAS Maryborough (HMS Nabstock) on 1 November 1945, equipped with three Supermarine Sea Otter, an amphibious air-sea rescue aircraft. Its stay was short and it embarked in the escort carrier HMS Striker on 4 November.
- 1845 Naval Air Squadron, a Single Seat Fighter Squadron formed here on 1 June 1945, equipped with twenty-four Vought Corsair Mk IV fighter bomber. It moved to RNAS Maryborough (HMS Nabstock) on 23 June 1945.

== Erection and Inspection performance ==
The table shows the expected number of aircraft erections and inspection by aircraft type, by month between May and August 1945.

Erection and Inspection Programme versus Performance
May
| Action | Programme | Performance |
|---|---|---|
| Erections | 15 x Supemarine Seafire | 9 x Supermarine Seafire |
| Erections | 35 x Vought Corsair | 15 x Vought Corsair |
| Minor Inspections | 7 x Vought Corsair | 7 x Vought Corsair |
June
| Action | Programme | Performance |
| Erections | 10 x Supemarine Seafire | 0 x Supermarine Seafire |
| Erections | 40 x Vought Corsair | 24 x Vought Corsair |
| Minor Inspections | 14 x Vought Corsair | 6 x Vought Corsair |
July
| Action | Programme | Performance |
| Erections | 25 x Supemarine Seafire | 9 x Supermarine Seafire |
| Erections | 25 x Vought Corsair | 23 x Vought Corsair |
| Minor Inspections | 15 x Vought Corsair | 11 x Vought Corsair |
August
| Action | Programme | Performance |
| Erections | 25 x Supemarine Seafire | 9 x Supermarine Seafire |
| Erections | 40 x Vought Corsair | 23 x Vought Corsair |
| Minor Inspections | 15 x Vought Corsair | 1 x Vought Corsair; 1 x Supermarine Seafire |
