= 1852 Naval Air Squadron =

Inactive flying squadron of the Royal Navy's Fleet Air Arm

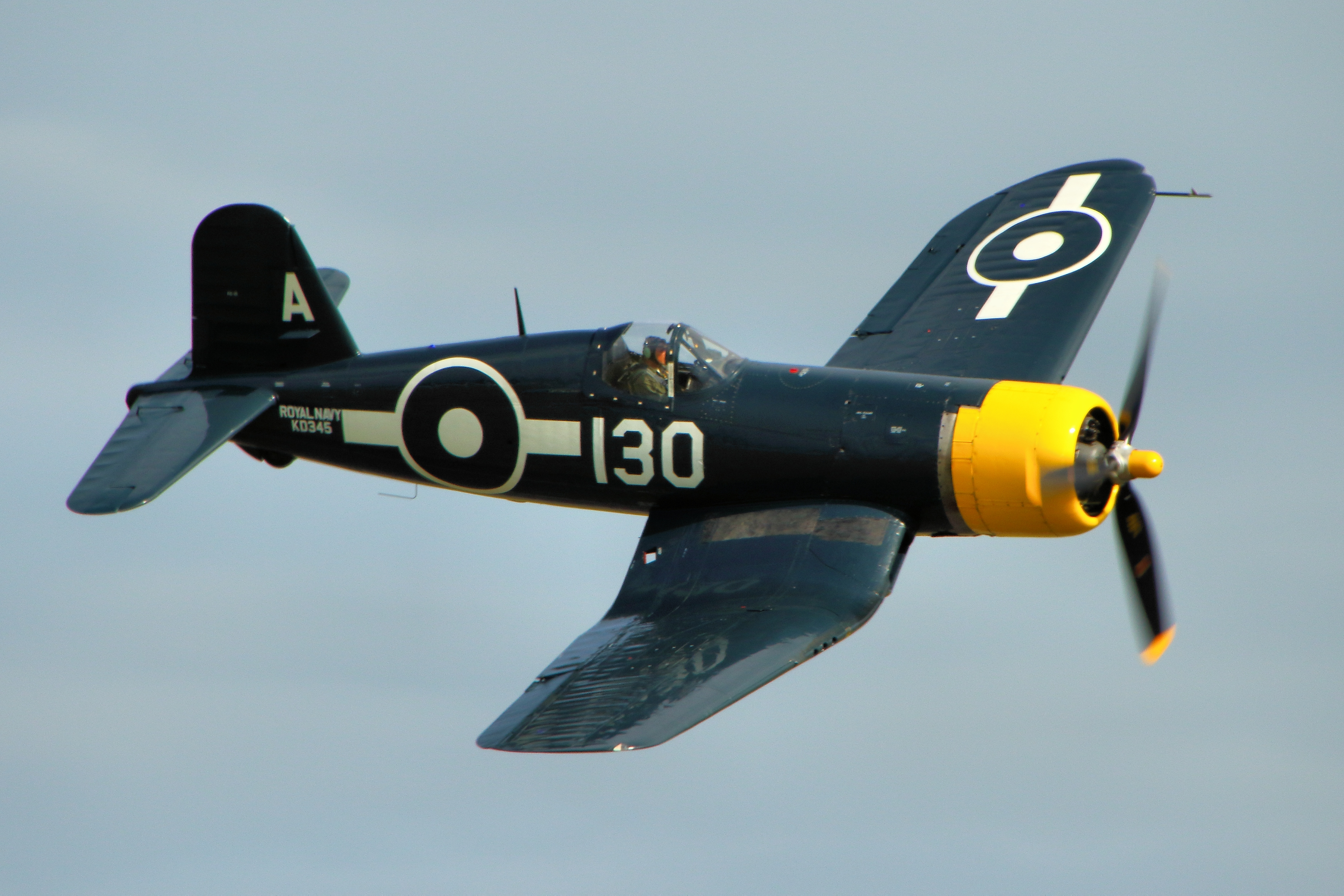
- A Fleet Air Arm Goodyear FG-1D Corsair; an example of the type used by 1852 NAS
- Active: 1945
- Disbanded: 18 August 1945
- Country: United Kingdom
- Branch: Royal Navy
- Type: Single-seat fighter squadron
- Role: Fighter squadron
- Size: Eighteen aircraft
- Part of: Fleet Air Arm
- Home station: See Naval air stations section for full list.

Commanders
- Notable commanders: Lieutenant Commander(A) I.F. Voller, RNVR

Insignia
- Identification Markings: 1V10+ single letters (May 1945)

Aircraft flown
- Fighter: Vought Corsair

1852 Naval Air Squadron (1852 NAS) was a Fleet Air Arm (FAA) naval air squadron of the United Kingdom's Royal Navy (RN). It formed at RN Air Section Brunswick, in the United States on 1 February 1945 as a fighter squadron, with eighteen Vought Corsair Mk IV fighter aircraft. Following deck landing training aboard the USS Charger, it embarked in HMS Patroller for the United Kingdom on 5 May. It disembarked to HMS Gadwall, RNAS Belfast, on 25 May, but due to V-J Day it disbanded on 29 August.

== History ==
=== Single-seat fighter squadron (1945) ===
1852 Naval Air Squadron formed on 1 February 1945 in the United States at RN Air Section Brunswick, which was located at United States Naval Air Station (USNAS) Brunswick, Maine, as a Single Seat Fighter Squadron, under the command of Lieutenant Commander(A) I.F. Voller, RNVR.

It was equipped with eighteen Vought Corsair aircraft, an American carrier-borne fighter-bomber. These were the Goodyear built FG-1D variant, designated Corsair Mk IV by the Fleet Air Arm. Aerodrome Dummy Deck Landings (ADDLs) were undertaken at the nearby Bar Harbor Naval Auxiliary Air Facility (NAAF), Bar Harbor, Maine. The squadron flew to RN Air Section Norfolk situated at USNAS Norfolk, to enable it to undertake Deck Landing Training (DLT) with the escort carrier USS Charger, before returning to RN Air Section Brunswick. It then returned to RN Air Section Norfolk arriving on 30 April for embarkation in the Ruler-class escort carrier, HMS Patroller, for transportation to the United Kingdom.

By the May all aircrew, equipment and aircraft were embarked in HMS Patroller, at Naval Station Norfolk, and she sailed to New York City to embark further passengers. On 10 May HMS Patroller then joined Convoy CU.69 and sailed for Belfast, Northern Ireland. 1852 Naval Air Squadron disembarked on 25 May to Royal Naval Air Maintenance Yard Belfast.

The squadron moved to RNAS Eglinton (HMS Gannet), Derry, Northern Ireland, the next day, and while here it began to convert from a normal reflector gunsight to a gyro gunsight. The squadron was to form part of the 18th Carrier Air Group, along with 822 Naval Air Squadron. When the Japanese surrendered on 15 August, the 18th Carrier Air Group became unnecessary and on 29 August the squadron moved to RNAS Nutts Corner (HMS Pintail), County Antrim, Northern Ireland, disbanding on arrival.

== Aircraft flown ==
1852 Naval Air Squadron flew only one aircraft type:

- Vought Corsair Mk IV fighter bomber (February - August 1945)

== Naval air stations ==
1852 Naval Air Squadron operated from a naval air stations of the Royal Navy, in the United Kingdom, a number overseas, and a Royal Navy escort carrier:

- RN Air Section Brunswick, Maine, (1 February - 30 April 1945)
- RN Air Section Norfolk, Virginia, (Detachment Deck Landing Training (DLT) USS Charger) 3 - 8 April 1945)
- RN Air Section Norfolk, Virginia, (30 April - 4 May 1945)
- HMS Patroller (4 - 26 May- 1945)
- Royal Naval Air Station Eglinton (HMS Gannet), County Londonderry, (26 May - 9 August 1945)
- Royal Naval Air Maintenance Yard Belfast (HMS Gadwall), County Antrim, (9 - 29 August 1945)
- Royal Naval Air Station Nutts Corner (HMS Pintail), County Antrim, disbanded (29 August 1945)

== Commanding officers ==
List of commanding officers of 1852 Naval Air Squadron with date of appointment:

- Lieutenant Commander(A) I.F. Voller, RNVR, from 1 February 1945
- disbanded - 29 August 1945

Note: Abbreviation (A) signifies Air Branch of the RN or RNVR.
