= RAF Sydenham =

Former Royal Air Force station in County Antrim, Northern Ireland (1939–1970)

RAF Sydenham RAF Belfast RNAS Belfast RNAY Belfast HMS Gadwell HMS Gannet III
- Belfast, County Antrim in Northern Ireland

Site information
- Type: Royal Air Force station
- Owner: Air Ministry; Admiralty
- Operator: Royal Air Force; Royal Navy
- Controlled by: RAF Flying Training Command; Fleet Air Arm
- Condition: Active for civil aviation

Location
- Shown within Northern Ireland RAF Sydenham (the United Kingdom)
- Coordinates: 54°36′51″N 005°52′37″W

Site history
- Built: 1939
- In use: 1939-1973
- Fate: Civil aviation airport
- Battles/wars: European theatre of World War II; Cold War

Airfield information
- Elevation: 18 feet (5 m) AMSL
Runways
Direction	Length and surface
05/23	1,100 yards (1,006 m) x 67 yards (61 m) Asphalt
13/31	1,100 yards (1,006 m) x 67 yards (61 m) (re-aligned in 1945 from 14/32 Asphalt

Royal Air Force Sydenham or more simply RAF Sydenham is a former Royal Air Force station in Northern Ireland. In the 1970s, it was the main servicing base for Blackburn Buccaneer aircraft, employing 650 civilian workers. Military use of the site ended in 1973, and it is now Belfast City Airport.

== History ==
RAF Sydenham was opened by the wife of British Prime Minister Neville Chamberlain on 16th March 1938 revealed the new Belfast Harbour Airport but was shortly after became RAF Sydenham when The Second World War began in 1939. RAF Sydenham was home to two squadrons of the Royal Air Force’s famous RAF Bomber Command in 1940 and 1941; both No. 88 Squadron RAF as well as No. 226 Squadron RAF were stationed there.

From 21 June 1943, the base was transferred from the RAF to the Navy becoming HMS Gadwall until 30 April 1946. It remained in use by the Royal Navy as HMS Gannet III until 31 May 1959.

Military Units Posted to RAF Sydenham
Unit	Military Branch	Dates at RAF Sydenham
702 Naval Air Squadron	Royal Navy	1943–1959
706 Naval Air Squadron	Royal Navy	1943–1959
721 Naval Air Squadron	Royal Navy	1943–1959
800 Naval Air Squadron	Royal Navy	1943–1959
804 Naval Air Squadron	Royal Navy	1943–1959
807 Naval Air Squadron	Royal Navy	1943–1959
808 Naval Air Squadron	Royal Navy	1943–1959
811 Naval Air Squadron	Royal Navy	1943–1959
812 Naval Air Squadron	Royal Navy	1943–1959
815 Naval Air Squadron	Royal Navy	1943–1959
818 Naval Air Squadron	Royal Navy	1943–1944
819 Naval Air Squadron	Royal Navy	1943–1944
822 Naval Air Squadron	Royal Navy	1943–1959
825 Naval Air Squadron	Royal Navy	1943–1959
826 Naval Air Squadron	Royal Navy	1943–1959
827 Naval Air Squadron	Royal Navy	1943–1959
836 Naval Air Squadron	Royal Navy	1943–1959
836M Flight	Royal Navy	1943–1959
838 Naval Air Squadron	Royal Navy	1943–1959
842 Naval Air Squadron	Royal Navy	1943–1959
845 Naval Air Squadron	Royal Navy	1943–1959
848 Naval Air Squadron	Royal Navy	1943–1959
849 Naval Air Squadron	Royal Navy	1943–1959
857 Naval Air Squadron	Royal Navy	1944–1945
881 Naval Air Squadron	Royal Navy	1943–1959
882 Naval Air Squadron	Royal Navy	1943–1959
885 Naval Air Squadron	Royal Navy	1943–1959
886 Naval Air Squadron	Royal Navy	1943–1959
887 Naval Air Squadron	Royal Navy	1943–1959
888 Naval Air Squadron	Royal Navy	1943–1959
889 Naval Air Squadron	Royal Navy	1943–1959
891 Naval Air Squadron	Royal Navy	1943–1959
899 Naval Air Squadron	Royal Navy	1943–1959
1772 Naval Air Squadron	Royal Navy	1943–1959
1790 Naval Air Squadron	Royal Navy	1943–1959
1830 Naval Air Squadron	Royal Navy	1943–1959
1831 Naval Air Squadron	Royal Navy	1943–1959
1833 Naval Air Squadron	Royal Navy	1943–1959
1835 Naval Air Squadron	Royal Navy	1943–1959
1836 Naval Air Squadron	Royal Navy	1943–1959
1843 Naval Air Squadron	Royal Navy	1943–1959
1850 Naval Air Squadron	Royal Navy	1943–1959
1851 Naval Air Squadron	Royal Navy	1943–1959
1852 Naval Air Squadron	Royal Navy	1943–1959
870 Squadron RCN (VF-870)	Royal Navy	1943–1959
No. 88 Squadron RAF	Royal Air Force	1940–1941
No. 226 Squadron RAF	Royal Air Force	1940–1941

== Incidents ==
On October 6, 1972, a Buccaneer S.2A (registration XV339) suffered an emergency during a post-overhaul test flight during a dumping fuel action the dump valve stuck open. The crew safely ejected, but the aircraft crashed directly onto a residential street (20 Orby Link, off the Castlereagh Road) in East Belfast. Nobody was killed and only one man was injured and taken to hospital. The fuel nozzle of the plane is still displayed in the reception area of Calvert Office Equipment Ltd (the premises that the Buccaneer crashed into) for friends and customers to view.

== Other units ==
- No. 3 Civilian Fighter Control Co-operation Unit RAF (March 1957 – June 1958)
- Detachment of No. 6 Anti-Aircraft Co-operation Unit RAF (1943)
- No. 8 Ferry Pilots Pool ATA (March 1941 – May 1942) became No. 8 Ferry Pool ATA (May 1942 – August 1945)
- No. 13 Air Experience Flight RAF between 8 September 1958 and 1973 then again between 31 March 1978 and 31 July 1976.
- No. 23 Elementary and Reserve Flying Training School RAF (September 1939) became No. 24 Elementary Flying Training School RAF (September 1939 – February 1942)
- No. 24 Elementary and Reserve Flying Training School RAF (January – September 1939) became No. 24 Elementary Flying Training School RAF (September 1939 – February 1942)
- No. 75 (Bomber) Wing RAF between 27 and 30 June 1940 became SHQ Belfast
- SHQ Belfast between 30 June 1940 and 10 February 1941 became No. 75 (Bomber) Wing RAF (February – April 1941) became No. 31 Wing RAF (April – June 1941)
  - Station Defence Flight operated a Hawker Demon
- No. 79 Wing Calibration Flight RAF
- No. 203 Gliding School RAF (September 1949 – November 1952)
- Detachment of No. 1480 (Anti-Aircraft Co-operation) Flight RAF (September 1942)
- No. 1494 (Target Towing) Flight RAF (April 1942 – April 1943)
- Northern Ireland Universities Air Squadron predecessor organization Queens University Air Squadron operated from RAF Sydenham between 1941 and 1992.
- RAF Northern Ireland Communication Flight RAF (October 1940 – October 1942 & December 1945 – December 1946)

== Current use ==
The site is now Belfast City Airport.
