= HMS Begum (D38) =

American escort carrier transferred to the Royal Navy

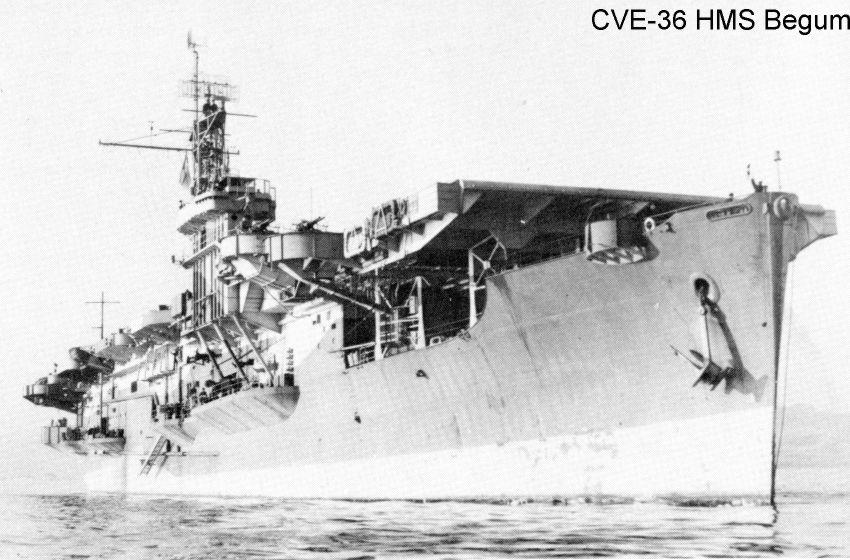
- HMS Begum

History

United States
- Name: USS Bolinas
- Builder: Seattle-Tacoma Shipbuilding Corporation
- Laid down: 3 August 1942
- Launched: 11 November 1942
- Commissioned: 22 July 1943
- Decommissioned: 1 August 1943
- Fate: Transferred to Royal Navy

United Kingdom
- Name: HMS Begum
- Commissioned: 2 August 1943
- Decommissioned: 26 February 1946
- Identification: Pennant number:D38
- Fate: Sold as merchant ship; scrapped in 1974

General characteristics
- Class & type: Bogue-class escort carrier (US); Ruler-class escort carrier (UK)
- Displacement: 15,390 tons
- Length: 494 ft (151 m)
- Beam: 69 ft 6 in (21.18 m)
- Draught: 26 ft (7.9 m)
- Propulsion: Steam turbines, 1 shaft, 8,500 shp (6,338 kW)
- Speed: 18.5 knots (34.3 km/h)
- Complement: 646 officers and men
- Armament: 2 × 4"/50, 5"/38 or 5"/51 guns; 8 × twin 40 mm Bofors; 35 × single 20 mm Oerlikon
- Aircraft carried: 24

USS Bolinas (CVE-36) (originally AVG-36, then later ACV-36) was an escort carrier launched 11 November 1942 by Seattle-Tacoma Shipbuilding, Tacoma, Washington; sponsored by Mrs. G. B. Sherwood, wife of Commander Sherwood; and commissioned 22 July 1943, Captain H. L. Meadow in command.

== Design and description ==
These ships were all larger and had a greater aircraft capacity than all the preceding American built escort carriers. They were also all laid down as escort carriers and not converted merchant ships. All the ships had a complement of 646 men and an overall length of 492 feet 3 inches (150.0 m), a beam of 69 feet 6 inches (21.2 m) and a draught of 25 ft 6 in (7.8 m). Propulsion was provided by a steam turbine, two boilers connected to one shaft giving 9,350 brake horsepower (SHP), which could propel the ship at 16.5 knots (30.6 km/h; 19.0 mph).

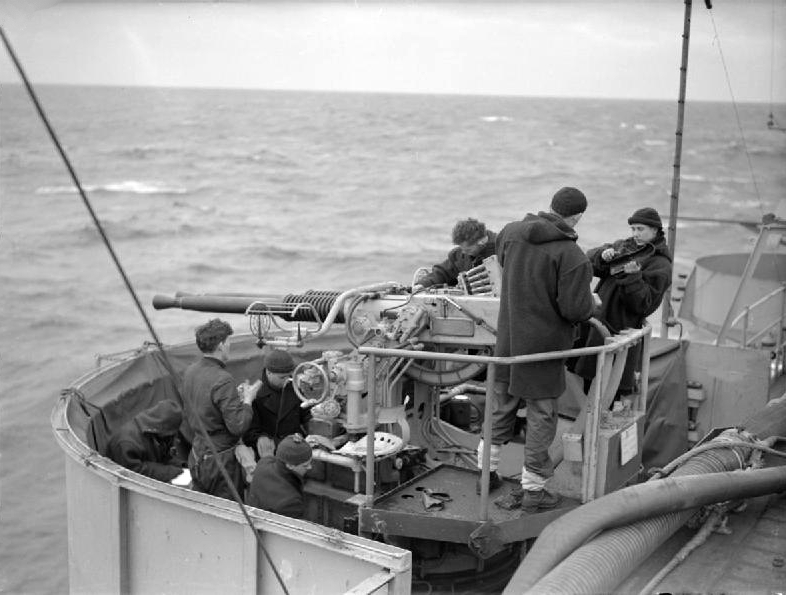
Twin 40 mm Bofors anti-aircraft gun.

Aircraft facilities were a small combined bridge–flight control on the starboard side, two aircraft lifts 43 feet (13.1 m) by 34 feet (10.4 m), one aircraft catapult and nine arrestor wires. Aircraft could be housed in the 260 feet (79.2 m) by 62 feet (18.9 m) hangar below the flight deck. Armament comprised: two 4"/50, 5"/38 or 5"/51 Dual Purpose guns in single mounts, sixteen 40 mm Bofors anti-aircraft guns in twin mounts and twenty 20 mm Oerlikon anti-aircraft cannons in single mounts. They had a maximum aircraft capacity of twenty-four aircraft which could be a mixture of Grumman Martlet, Vought F4U Corsair or Hawker Sea Hurricane fighter aircraft and Fairey Swordfish or Grumman Avenger anti-submarine aircraft.

== Service history ==
On 2 August 1943 after being decommissioned Bolinas was transferred to the United Kingdom under Lend-Lease and renamed HMS Begum (D38). Begum served with the Royal Navy during World War II, doing anti-submarine sweeps in the Indian Ocean with 832 Squadron as her complement, participating in the sinking of the German submarine U-198.

Begum ferried the following RN squadrons to the Far East April 1944:

1839: 10 F6F disembarked Madras 14 April

1844: 10 F6F disembarked Madras 14 April

815: 12 Barracuda II disembarked Madras 14 April

817: 12 Barracuda II disembarked Madras 14 April

After her return she was declared surplus by the U. S. Navy. She was stricken for disposal 19 June 1946 and sold by the Navy into merchant service 16 April 1947 as Raki and later I Yung. She was scrapped in Taiwan in March 1974.
