= Mobile Naval Air Base =

Royal Navy mobile logistics support for the Fleet Air Arm

The Mobile Naval Airfield Organisation (MNAO) was the shore-based component of the naval air logistics organisation. This comprised two types of units, a Mobile Operational Naval Air Base (MONAB) and a Transportable Aircraft Maintenance Yard (TAMY). These were mobile units, the first of which formed in 1944, to provide logistical support to the Fleet Air Arm squadrons of the Royal Navy's British Pacific Fleet, towards the end of World War II.

There were a number of units within and each unit was self-contained and designed to service and repair aircraft and engines. Each were initially assembled at the MNAO headquarters at HMS Flycatcher, which first commissioned at RNAS Ludham, Norfolk, then later at RNAS Middle Wallop, Hampshire, both in the UK, and then were forward deployed.

When the naval threat in the Atlantic was clearly vanishing, with the decline of Nazi Germany, proposals were made to involve the Royal Navy in the Pacific War. The United States Navy's Commander-in-Chief, Admiral Ernest King, did not welcome this, however. A well-known anglophobe, King preferred to exclude the British and, in addition, he laid down operating requirements that could not be met at the time. One of these was that the Royal Navy should be self-sustaining and independent of United States Navy (USN) logistical resources for extended periods of active service.

King was effectively overruled, and the Royal Navy began establishing an adequate logistical infrastructure which included MONABs.

== Concept ==
During the Second World War, to meet the Royal Navy Eastern Fleet's requirements, to provide serviceable aircraft for aircraft carriers, along with trained aircrew, airbases were constructed in Africa. They were just about completed by the time the fleet returned to Ceylon but at that point they were then no longer required. The Director Naval Air Division (DNAD) drafted requirements for mobile bases in October 1942 and following a meeting in November the concept of a mobile naval airfield was created.

In September 1943, Colonel Fuller, RM, was appointed as Senior Officer Mobile Naval Airfields Organisation (SOMNAO) and this was effectively the beginning of the Mobile Naval Airfields Organisation (MNAO). November saw a proposed structure and size for a MNAO and at the beginning of 1944 the plan for the location of operations was likely to be Ceylon. However, in the spring a British Pacific Fleet was to form and the plan for the location of the operations moved to Australia. On 1 August 1944, the formation of a headquarters for the MNAO and the first two MONABs in the United Kingdom was considered.

The Admiralty had no suitable sites available so the search turned to the Royal Air Force. The Air Ministry proposed the airfield at Ludham, 11 miles (18 km) north east of Norwich, Norfolk. It was agreed to take up the offer of the fighter station to use as an HQ and forming centre, and the Royal Navy started moving into Ludham on 23 August. The station was commissioned on 4 September as HMS Flycatcher, Headquarters Mobile Naval Airfields Organisation.

== Mobile Naval Airfield Organisation ==
The Mobile Naval Airfield Organisation (MNAO) was eventually made up of two different types of unit: the Mobile Operational Naval Air Base (MONAB) and the Transportable Aircraft Maintenance Yard (TAMY).

Initially, a Mobile Naval Airfield Unit (MNAU) was the first type of mobile unit conceived. This was envisaged to be set up in forward areas. The second type of unit devised was a Transportable Air Base (TAB) which was more akin to an aircraft repair yard. Due to the modular "component" system an MNAU could be upgraded to a TAB if required. However, these had developed and renamed Mobile Operational Naval Air Base by the middle of 1944 and there became a type A (Small) and a type B (Large). The former providing mobile maintenance, supporting 50 aircraft and the latter included mobile repair, supporting 100 aircraft (the equivalent of a TAB). A third unit was created, a Transportable Aircraft Maintenance Yard (TAMY), to provide mobile aircraft repair facilities.

The initial idea of the MONAB was

"the rapid provision of facilities at airfields and airstrips for the training and maintenance of naval air squadrons disembarked from carriers operating in advance of existing bases".

These were not envisaged as an active shore base for naval aircraft to operate from against the enemy. These were to supply personnel and material, typical of naval aviation, to facilitate naval aircraft to utilise airfields controlled by the Royal Air Force or any other Service.

The TAMY was much less mobile than a MONAB and much more complex. These were not intended for the forward areas and were expected to be situated close to the main fleet, and their personnel needed to be highly skilled. They were equipped with a full range of workshops, included aircraft stores and equipment, and were capable of under-taking major repairs and overhauls to airframes, engines and components.

A decision was made to form five MONABs and one TAMY early in 1944. These were to be assembled in the UK and transported to the Far East for service there. The Royal Air Force station at Ludham, Norfolk, was acquired and commissioned as HMS Flycatcher, known as Royal Naval Air Station Ludham, in August. It was used to assemble the MONABs at around one per month, however, at the end of 1944 Ludham was returned to the RAF, and swapped for the Royal Air Force station at Middle Wallop, Hampshire. The MNAO HQ, HMS Flycatcher, moved in and the airbase was known as Royal Naval Air Station Middle Wallop.

In November 1944 four Royal Australian Air Force (RAAF) airfields were chosen for transfer to the Royal Navy. These were the RAAF Station at Nowra, around 80 miles (130 km) south of the city of Sydney, and was planned as a MONAB to hold up to ninety aircraft and to have a Mobile Aircraft Torpedo Maintenance Unit (MATMU). RAAF Jervis Bay, which was about 20 miles (32 km) east of Nowra, and was also planned as a MONAB to hold up to ninety aircraft and to have a MATMU. RAAF Station Schofields was also chosen and was initially planned to support fighter squadrons. The airbase was located approximately 30 miles (48 km) west of Sydney. Bankstown Airport, which was 12 miles (19 km) south west of Sydney, was needed as a Receipt and Despatch Unit and possess the ability for assembling seventy aircraft at first, then rising to two-hundred per month.

By May 1945 it was clear the programme of works at these four airfields were overrunning. To mitigate, other airfields that needed less adjustments than those already selected, were considered. These sites were put forward by the Royal Navy to fulfil its increasing requirements, including a required by date:

- RAAF Station Evans Head, Evans Head, New South Wales - required by August 1945
- RAAF Station Narromine, Narromine, New South Wales - required by September 1945
- Greenhills - required by October 1945
- RAAF Base Coffs Harbour, Coffs Harbour - required by November 1945
- Cecil Plains, Queensland - required by December 1945
- Leyburn Airfield Leyburn, Queensland - required by January 1946

Greenhills and RAAF Base Coffs Harbour were singled out for further inspection. However, the Second World War ended before anything further could be realised with these.

By V-J Day, nine MONABs and a single TAMY had assembled and left the UK, and a tenth MONAB was forming at RNAS Middle Wallop. Six of the nine, and the TAMY, had taken over air stations or establishments, but some of them were only half built in Australia.

The surrender of Japan on 15 August prompted a stop to the work at RNAS Middle Wallop (HMS Flycatcher), although MONAB X still commissioned on 1 September 1945 as HMS Nabhurst. As there was no operational need for this unit it paid off on 12 October, but its equipment, along with Mobile Repair (MR) No. 4, were kept on Care & Maintenance. MONABs XI, XII, XIII, XIV, XV and a proposed second TAMY were all cancelled.

The airfield at Middle Wallop was to be handed back to the RAF in April 1946. A review of the organisation was to take place and the MNAO was to become a lodger unit at RNAS Lossiemouth, Moray. In particular MONAB X and MATMU 1 were to be housed at RNAS Lossiemouth while MR 4 was to be installed at Lossiemouth's satellite airfield RNAS Milltown. Lossiemouth was scheduled to be commissioned on 12 July, therefore as an interim measure the MNAO was to be accommodated across three sites: RNAS Fearn (HMS Owl), Ross-shire, Scotland, RNAS Inskip (HMS Nightjar) and RNAE Risley (HMS Gosling), both in Lancashire, England, whilst awaiting a move to their new home.

== MONAB Development Unit ==
The Mobile Naval Airfield Organisation's name was changed to reflect its new role, becoming the MONAB Development Unit (MDU). By 1950, MONAB X was held in storage at RNAS Lossiemouth (HMS Fulmar), however, it was decided in the autumn of that year to reactivate it at a reserve airfield and RNAS Henstridge, Somerset, was chosen.

Confidential Admiralty Fleet Order (CAFO) 139/51 took MONAB 10 (Roman numerals had been dropped) out of storage from 7 September 1951. Spring 1942 saw the initial components arrive at RNAS Yeovilton (HMS Heron), Somerset, approximately 12 miles (19 km) from RNAS Henstridge, and by the autumn MONAB 10 was in place. The unit disbanded on 2 July 1955, but by the end of the decade the MONAB Development Unit had disappeared from official records.

It was confirmed in April 1956, by the Director of Air Operations and Training, that the MONAB Development Unit had been dispersed. Also adding that its equipment, located at RNAS Henstridge and RNAS Yeovilton, was regarded obsolete.

== MONAB ==
A MONAB was designed to have all of the effectiveness of a naval air station, or an aircraft carrier, and could be conveyed to any spot around the world. It was made up of a number of non-technical and technical units. There were non-technical units such as a command & executive unit, a medical unit, stores, a flying control unit and a radio & radar unit. The technical units included componenets such as a mobile maintenance unit, a maintenance servicing unit, maintenance air radio and maintenance air gunnery units. There were also some supplementary add-on expert units such as a maintenance storage & reserve unit, a mobile repair unit and a mobile air torpedo maintenance unit.

In order to support the mobile bases the MNAO needed to find large numbers of specialist vehicles and trailers to cater for the mobilisation. Vehicles for functions and roles such as: containerised workshops and offices, air traffic control and Very high frequency (VHF) and Direction finding (DF) vans, meteorological van for weather forecasting, photographic tender, bakery, electrical generating, crashtenders, ambulances, and more.

=== MONAB Structure ===
The basic MONAB structure comprised a fixed set of six common elements: command, administration, repair & air maintenance, operations & training, airfield defence, and construction. The repair and maintenance components were then relevant to the units role:

- The command element - this consisted a commanding officer (captain or commander), an executive officer (Commander or lieutenant commander) and staff.
- The administration element - this comprised Medical, Dental, Pay office, Naval & Air stores, Clothing stores, Messing, Victualling, Station Maintenance - encompassing accommodation, Discipline, Motor Transport, Water & Sanitation.
- The repair & air maintenance element was made up of workshops for: Air gunnery, Mobile Air Radio Maintenance, Mobile Maintenance, Mobile Servicing (Mobile Repair, Mobile Storage & Reserve, Mobile Personnel, Mobile Air Torpedo Maintenance Unit, Maintenance Annex, Standard Preservation Unit attached as required) by role.
- Operations & Training - this contained Flying control, Radio & Radar, Flight Deck Officer, Meteorological, Photographic, Station Flight, and a Fleet Requirements Unit if one existed.
- Airfield Defence - this was made up of Ground defence, Support, Anti-Aircraft Defence.
- Construction - a detachment of Royal Marine Engineers - No construction units were ever assembled (assumed only required by a forward area MONAB if no appropriate site were available).

=== Miscellaneous components ===
Where specific situations arose, some additional non-technical components could be attached to a MONAB to meet an exact need. For these units it is unknown what size the personnel levels were:

- Aircraft Erection unit - this components role was to fit together reserve airframes as part of a Receipt and Despatch MONAB, or TAMY.
- Aircraft Equipping unit - Its role was to install equipment into the assembled reserve airframes, as part of a Receipt and Despatch MONAB, or TAMY.
- Aircraft Stripping unit - this was tasked with the removal of equipment and parts from airframes damaged beyond local repair, as part of a Receipt and Despatch MONAB, or TAMY.
- Standard Preservation Unit (SPU) - This component was responsible for the preservation of aircraft that were to be held in storage, or were for shipment by sea.
- Mobile Malarial Hygiene Unit (MMHU) - These were specialist medical units and were attached to other units that were operating in areas infested with mosquitoes carrying malaria.

=== Repair & air maintenance elements ===
With the exception of MONAB II and TAMY I, all mobile airfield units were formed with one Mobile Maintenance element and two Maintenance Servicing elements. Each Mobile Repair element and Maintenance, Storage & Reserve element were attached to each unit where needed.

==== Mobile components ====
- Moblile Servicing (MS) - An Mobile Servicing unit was tasked to support the servicing of twenty-five aircraft over fourteen days. Each unit was equipped with four specialist lorries. This allocation included one lorry fitted out as a workshop, two general stores lorries and one general purpose lorry for transporting ground equipment. An MS units personnel was a couple of Officers, eight CPOs and POs and five ratings. Each individual MS unit was tasked to support specific aircraft types (see individual MS listing for details).
- Mobile Maintenance (MM) - Each Mobile Maintenance unit was tasked with the maintenance of up to 50 aircraft of different types, with aircraft repair by parts replacement, and the repair & overhaul of aircraft components, for one month. These units were equipped with six specialist lorries. These included one machine shop lorry, one electrical and instrument workshop lorry, one lorry as a general-purpose workshop, one battery charging lorry and two generator lorries. Two steel framed, canvas covered portable Dorland hangars were provided for the work to be carried out under cover, capable of housing one large & one small aircraft. An MM unit was manned by six Officers, twenty-five CPOs and POs and sixty-four ratings.
- Mobile Air Radio Maintenance (MAR) - These components comprised three Radio and four Radar workshops, two stores lorries and two 22 Kw generator lorries, similar to those used by an MM. The workshops were on road/rail containers which were mounted on three Ton Bedford trucks. One MAR component was attached to each MONAB and supported all equipment types in use by the British Pacific Fleet. Manned by one or two Air Radio Officers and twenty-six ratings.
- Maintenance, Storage & Reserve (MSR) - These units were intended to maintain and store fifty reserve aircraft, with each unit being equipped with a Dorland hangar for maintenance work. Attached to MONABs where reserve aircraft stocks were to be held. Individual MSR units stored a number of different aircraft types (see individual MSR listing for details). An MSR unit had its own complement of 3 Officers, 29 CPOs & POs and 99 ratings.
- Mobile Personnel (MP) - This component was made up of maintenance personnel. They provided their own tool kits and were tasked with supporting a disembarked squadron that had no maintenance ratings of its own.
- Mobile Air Torpedo Maintenance Unit (MATMU) - This units role was torpedo servicing and supply. These units where attached to MONABs which supported disembarked Torpedo, Bomber & Reconnaissance (TBR) squadrons, and provided an Air Torpedo live firing range. (see individual MATMU listing for details). A MATMU was manned by 1 Officer. 2 CPOs & POs and 30 ratings.

==== Pack-ups ====
- Mobile Repair (MR) - A containerised pack-up unit tasked with carrying out repairs above those handled by an MM unit, but below the level requiring the attention of an aircraft repair yard. It had a large range of machine tool and equipment. These units were intended for inclusion in type 'A' MONABs, to undertake major inspections. However, due to operational demands some of the MR units in Australia were moved from unit to unit when required. Two Brook hangars were provided to enable sixteen concurrent aircraft engine changes. Each MR unit was tasked with support of a number of different aircraft types (see individual MR listing for details). The manning levels for these units is not known.
- Mobile Servicing & Maintenance (MSM) - A containerised pack-up unit containing all the equipment of one MM and two MS units, without the specialist vehicles, as it was designed to be substituted for the MM & MS components in a MONAB, to be installed at an airfield. MONAB II was the only unit known to have included an MSM.
- Maintenance Annex (MA) - These units could have been 'add on' components to supplement an MR, however, their tasking is not clear, (see individual MA listing for details). The manning levels for these units is not known.

=== Complement ===
The number of personnel for a typical MONAB were adjusted as necessary and it is entirely feasible that no two MONABs had the same complement. Additional officers and ratings were added post formation and despatch as each unit needed to be modified to meet a specific role. Arguably, MONAB VII was likely the nearest to something of a standard complement.

==== A typical MONAB complement ====
Complement for a typical MONAB
Component	Function	Officers	NCOs	Ratings	Total
A	Command & Executive	11	21	117	149
C	Medical	4	1	8	13
S	Stores	2	3	28	33
F	Flying Control	10	1	35	46
R	Radio & Radar	4	10	49	63
MG	Maintenance, Air Gunnery	3	7	45	55
MS	Maintenance Servicing	4	16	10	30
MM	Mobile Maintenance	6	25	64	95
MATMU	Mobile Air torpedo Maintenance Unit	1	2	30	33
Total					517

==== Additional complement ====
MONABs were required to accommodate and feed 950 personnel from disembarked squadrons. Any MONAB that held large numbers of reserve aircraft had a Mobile, Storage & Reserve (MSR) component and each of these had a complement of around 122 personnel.

Additional complement requirement
Component	Officers	CPO & PO	Ratings	Total
Accommodation for disembarked squadrons	140	125	665	950
Maintenance, Storage & Reserve Unit	3	20	99	122

== Units ==
There were eleven commissioned units, ten Mobile Operational Naval Air Bases MONABs and one Transportable Aircraft Maintenance Yard (TAMY), ten of these saw active service for the British Pacific Fleet, most based in Australia. The last unit was decommissioned in 1946. Five further MONABs and a planned second TAMY were all cancelled after V-J Day:

Commissioned Units
Unit name	Ship's name	Commissioned	Paid Off	Located
MONAB I	HMS Nabbington	28 October 1944	15 November 1945	RAAF Base Nowra, Nowra, New South Wales, Australia
MONAB II	HMS Nabberley	18 November 1944	31 March 1946	Bankstown Airport, Bankstown, New South Wales, Australia
MONAB III	HMS Nabthorpe	4 December 1944	15 November 1945	RAAF Station Schofields, Schofields, New South Wales, Australia
MONAB IV	HMS Nabaron	1 January 1945	10 November 1945	NAS Ponam Airfield, Ponam, Admiralty Islands
MONAB V	HMS Nabswick	1 February 1945	18 March 1946	RAAF Jervis Bay, Jervis Bay, Jervis Bay Territory, Australia; RAAF Base Nowra
TAMY I	HMS Nabsford	1 February 1945	31 March 1946	RAAF Station Archerfield, Brisbane, Queensland, Australia
MONAB VI	HMS Nabstock	1 April 1945	9 June 1946	RAAF Maryborough, Maryborough, Queensland, Australia; RAAF Station Schofields
MONAB VII	HMS Nabreekie	1 June 1945	5 November 1945	Meeandah, Brisbane, Queensland, Australia
MONAB VIII	HMS Nabcatcher	1 July 1945	1 April 1947	Kai Tak, Hong Kong
MONAB IX	HMS Nabrock	1 August 1945	15 December 1945	Sembawang Air Base, Sembawang, Singapore
MONAB X	HMS Nabhurst	1 September 1945	12 October 1945	Middle Wallop, Hampshire, England
Cancelled Units
Unit name	Ship's name	Commissioned	Fate	Intended location
MONAB XI	HMS Nabsfield ?^{[note]}	put on hold V-J Day	cancelled end of August 1945	intended for Greenhills, New South Wales, Australia
MONAB XII	HMS Nabstead ?^{[note]}	-	cancelled end of August 1945	intended for RAAF Base Coffs Harbour, Coffs Harbour, New South Wales, Australia
MONAB XIII	HMS Nabsmere ?^{[note]}	-	cancelled end of August 1945	intended for Cecil Plains, Queensland, Australia
MONAB XIV	-	-	cancelled end of August 1945	intended for RAAF Station Parkes, Parkes, New South Wales, Australia
MONAB XV	-	-	cancelled end of August 1945	intended for RAAF Base West Sale, West Sale, Victoria, Australia
TAMY II	-	-	-	-

note: Nabsfield, Nabstead and Nabsmere were originally promoted as the names for MONABs VII, VIII, & IX respectively. It is not clear why these units were renamed as Nabreekie, Nabcatcher, and Nabrock. It is assumed these names were still intended to be used by MONABs, and in the same order, as no other names were circulated.

=== MONAB I, HMS Nabbington ===
MONAB I formed at RNAS Ludlam (HMS Flycatcher) in September 1944, commissioned as HMS Nabbington on 28 October and departed from UK in November, arriving in Sydney in December, to commission at RAAF Nowra on 2 January 1945. The unit was able to fully support Vought Corsair fighter bomber and Grumman Avenger torpedo bomber aircraft. During March and April 1945, issues with the runways at RNAS Nowra meant the temporary use of the satellite base at RAAF Jervis Bay. Between February and October squadrons from the Royal Navy's fleet carriers HMS Illustrious, HMS Indefatigable, HMS Indomitable, HMS Formidable and HMS Victorious, were supported and it operated a Fleet Requirements Unit for aircraft carriers working up in the local area. It also held a formed up reserve Carrier Air Group. MONAB I paid off 15 November, being replaced by MONAB V, HMS Nabswick, at RNAS Nowra, and its personnel either returned to the UK or were absorbed by other MONABs in Australia.

=== MONAB II, HMS Nabberley ===
MONAB II assembled at RNAS Ludham (HMS Flycatcher)and RNATE Risley (HMS Gosling), in October 1944 as a Receipt and Dispatch Unit. An advance party sailed for Australia aboard the aircraft repair ship and light aircraft carrier, HMS Unicorn, followed by stores and equipment in November, and remaining personnel in December. The advance party arrived in Sydney in early December and moved to Bankstown Airport, the main party arrived in late January 1945 and Bankstown was transferred on loan to the Royal Navy and quickly commissioned as HMS Nabberley on 29 January. The unit could support every aircraft type in Fleet Air Arm service, including Supermarine Sea Otter and Beech Expeditor.

Insufficient aircraft manufacturing targets meant that the Mobile Storage unit was unnecessary, therefore, in February it was broken up, sections were allocated to a number of escort carriers and sent to Ponam Island to support MONAB IV and the Forward Aircraft Pool, and to TAMY I at RNAMY Archerfield in March. 723 Naval Air Squadron, a Fleet Requirements Unit, formed in February, moving to RNAS Nowra in May, and 724 Naval Air Squadron, a Communications squadron, formed in April, moved to RNAS Schofields in March 1946.

MONAB II and HMS Nabberley paid off at Bankstown Airport on 31 March 1946, the station returning to RAAF control.

=== MONAB III, HMS Nabthorpe ===
Assembled at RNAS Ludlam from mid-October 1944, commissioned as HMS Nabthorpe on 4 December, sailed for Australia and reached Sydney on 27 January 1945. It commissioned at RAAF Station Schofields on 18 February. A Crew Pool and Refresher Flying Squadron, a Supermarine Seafire Operational Training Unit and an Instrument Flying Training Squadron were based at HMS Nabthorpe. Between March and September the MONAB hosted disembarked squadrons from HMS Speaker, HMS Slinger, HMS Ruler, HMS Indefatigable, HMS Indomitable, HMS Victorious, HMS Venerable, HMS Glory and HMS Implacable. Following V-J Day, MONAB III decommissioned on 15 November.

=== MONAB IV, HMS Nabaron ===
Formed at RNAS Ludham in November 1944, commissioned as HMS Nabaron and sailed also for Australia in January 1945. It reached Manus Island in the Admiralty Islands via Sydney, then commissioned at the United States Navy constructed airstrip on Ponam Island as RNAS Ponam, on 2 April. It provided support for squadrons from HMS Formidable, HMS Implacable, HMS Vengeance and HMS Victorious and a number of escort carriers. It also provided reserve aircraft storage. After V-J Day aircraft and equipment were removed from RNAS Ponam, this taking place in October, and the MONAB decommissioned on 10 November 1945.

=== MONAB V, HMS Nabswick ===
Formed up in December 1944 at RNAS Ludham, commissioned as HMS Nabswick and sailed to Australia on 1 February 1945. It lodged at RNAS Nowra until eventually it took over RAAF Jervis Bay, on 1 May. A Fleet Requirements Unit was in operation and the MONAB supported disembarked squadrons from HMS Implacable, HMS Formidable, HMS Glory, HMS Colossus and HMS Vengeance, between May and October. It took over the airbase at Nowra on 15 November, replacing MONAB I there. MONAB V decommissioned on 18 March 1946.

=== TAMY I, HMS Nabsford ===
TAMY I was assembled in December 1944 with over 1,000 personnel split across two sites, at RNAS Ludham (HMS Flycatcher) and RNATE Risley (HMS Gosling). It was commissioned HMS Nabsford on 1 February and sailed for Australia where it took over the former US facilities at Archerfield Airport and commissioned RNAMY Archerfield on 27 March. The TAMY used a number of sites in the area including an Army camp at Focklea. It was tasked with the assembly of aircraft that had been shipped out from the US and UK, including in particular Vought Corsair and Supermarine Seafire. TAMY I absorbed MONAB VIl during November and paid off on 31 March 1946.

=== MONAB VI, HMS Nabstock ===
MONAB VI assembled at RNAS Middle Wallop (HMS Flycatcher) in March 1945 and commissioned as HMS Nabstock on 1 April. It sailed from Greenock, Scotland, in April and arrived in Sydney, Australia, 23 May. It arrived at RAAF Maryborough and commissioned as RNAS Maryborough on 1 June, sharing the airbase with the RAAF Radar School. Its role was to hold a stock of reserve aircraft, primarily Vought Corsair and Grumman Avenger, and from June through to October supported squadrons from HMS Indefatigable and HMS Victorious. Maryborough airfield was returned to the RAAF on 14 November and MONAB Vl moved to Schofields Airport, taking over from MONAB III and re-commissioned there as HMS Nabstock the following day. The airfield returned to the RAAF and HMS Nabstock decommissioned in June 1946.

=== MONAB VII, HMS Nabreekie ===
MONAB VII assembled at RNAS Middle Wallop (HMS Flycatcher) from mid-March 1945. It was conceived as a Receipt and Despatch unit. It sailed for Australia in June and arrived in Sydney on 28 July. Travelling onwards, it arrived at the former USN Seabee camp at Meeandah, near Brisbane, on 9 August and shared the airfield at Archerfield with TAMY I. It was also part based at Rocklea and here commissioned as HMS Nabreekie. Japan surrendered only one week afterwards and HMS Nabreekie eventually decommissioned on 5 November, and the majority of its ratings transferred to TAMY I.

=== MONAB VIII, HMS Nabcatcher ===
MONAB VIII assembled at RNAS Middle Wallop (HMS Flycatcher) in May 1945, It commissioned as HMS Nabcatcher on 1 July. Designated as a Fighter Support unit (Supermarine Seafire, Vought Corsair and Fairey Firefly), it arrived in Sydney on 31 August, destined for RAAF Amberley, Queensland, but was redirected to Hong Kong. It commissioned as RNAS Kai Tak on 28 September, providing shore facilities for disembarked squadrons, with 1701 Naval Air Squadron providing Air-Sea Rescue and 721 Naval Air Squadron, a Fleet Requirements Unit. It decommissioned in August 1946 and RNAS Kai Tak then came under the control of the shore station, HMS Tamar.

=== MONAB IX, HMS Nabrock ===
MONAB IX assembled at RNAS Middle Wallop (HMS Flycatcher) in July 1945. It commissioned on 1 August as HMS Nabrock and sailed for Australia in August, destined for RAAF Station Evans Head, New South Wales. However, after arriving in Sydney it was redirected to Singapore. HMS Nabrock and MONAB IX paid off on 15 December, however, the Ship's company were retained as the complement for the new HMS Simbang which re-commissioned as RNAS Sembawang the same day. The MONAB itself was held in storage at RNAS Sembawang until the mid-1950s but it was never used.

=== MONAB X, HMS Nabhurst ===
MONAB X assembled at RNAS Middle Wallop (HMS Flycatcher) from 23 July 1945 and was intended to support Vought Corsair and Supermarine Seafire. It was planned to be installed at RAAF Station Narromine, New South Wales. It commissioned as HMS Nabhurst on 1 September, but following V-J Day it was decommissioned on 12 October. The unit was retained by the MNAO for trials and development usage.

== Operational locations ==
The geographical distribution of MONAB operational facilities worldwide.

=== New South Wales ===
A map of New South Wales, Australia, illustrates the Royal Australian Air Force installations, where a Mobile Naval Air Base (MONAB) was established. These include RAAF Station Nowra, which accommodated HMS Nabbington and later HMS Nabswick; Bankstown Airport, the site of HMS Nabberley; RAAF Station Schofields, home to HMS Nabthorpe and subsequently HMS Nabstock; and RAAF Jervis Bay, the original base for HMS Nabswick.

Operational locations for the four MONABs which were situated in New South Wales, Australia. The colour of the location mark indicates the type of airbase or unit at each location, red: Mobile Operational Naval Air Base (MONAB)

=== Queensland ===
A map of Queensland, Australia, illustrates the locations of Royal Australian Air Force installations, highlighting where a Mobile Operational Naval Air Base (MONAB) and a Transportable Air Maintenance Yard (TAMY) were stationed. RAAF Station Archerfield served as the base for HMS Nabsford and HMS Nabreekie, while RAAF Maryborough was the original site for HMS Nabstock.

Operational locations for the two MONABs and the TAMY which were situated in Queensland, Australia. The colour of the location mark indicates the type of airbase or unit at each location, red: Mobile Operational Naval Air Base (MONAB), yellow: MONAB and Transportable Aircraft Maintenance Yard (TAMY)

=== Admiralty Islands ===
A map of Papua New Guinea illustrates the locations of United States Navy installations from World War II, highlighting the sites of a Mobile Naval Air Base (MONAB) and a Forward Aircraft Pool. NAS Ponam Island served as the base for HMS Nabaron, while the Royal Naval Forward Aircraft Pool No. I was established at NAS Pityilu Airfield.

The colour of the location mark indicates the type of airbase or unit at each location, red: Mobile Operational Naval Air Base (MONAB), green: RN Forward Aircraft Pool

=== Hong Kong ===
A map of Hong Kong indicating the location of Kai Tak, the site where the MONAB HMS Nabaron was stationed.

The colour of the location mark indicates the type of airbase or unit at each location, red: Mobile Operational Naval Air Base (MONAB)

=== Singapore ===
A map of Singapore indicating the location of Sembawang Air Base, which was the site of the MONAB HMS Nabrock.

The colour of the location mark indicates the type of airbase or unit at each location, red: Mobile Operational Naval Air Base (MONAB)

== Component allocations ==
Each of the individual repair and air maintenance elements supported a specific aircraft type or types. Each Mobile Servicing unit serviced one specific aircraft type, each Mobile Maintenance units serviced two or more aircraft types, usually aligned those types of the accompanying Mobile Servicing units. Individual Mobile, Storage & Reserve and Mobile Repair units also supported a number of different aircraft types.

=== Component allocation table for Mobile Servicing (MS) ===
Each Mobile Servicing unit serviced one specific type of aircraft as shown in the table below:

Mobile Servicing
Unit designation	Supported aircraft types	Attached to
Mobile Servicing (MS) No. 1	Grumman Avenger Mk.I & Mk.II	MONAB I
Mobile Servicing (MS) No. 2	Vought Corsair Mk II & Mk IV	MONAB I
Mobile Servicing (MS) No. 3	Fairey Firefly I	MONAB III
Mobile Servicing (MS) No. 4	Supermarine Seafire F Mk.III & L Mk.III	MONAB III
Mobile Servicing (MS) No. 5	Vought Corsair Mk II & Mk IV	MONAB IV
Mobile Servicing (MS) No. 6	Grumman Hellcat F. Mk. I & F. Mk. II	MONAB IV
Mobile Servicing (MS) No. 7	Grumman Avenger Mk.I & Mk.II	MONAB V
Mobile Servicing (MS) No. 8	Vought Corsair Mk II & Mk IV	MONAB V
Mobile Servicing (MS) No. 9	Grumman Avenger Mk.I & Mk.II	MONAB VI
Mobile Servicing (MS) No. 10	Vultee Vengeance TT.IV	MONAB VI
Mobile Servicing (MS) No. 11	Fairey Firefly I	MONAB VII
Mobile Servicing (MS) No. 12	Supermarine Sea Otter Mk I	MONAB VII
Mobile Servicing (MS) No. 13	Vought Corsair Mk II & Mk IV	MONAB VIII
Mobile Servicing (MS) No. 14	Supermarine Seafire F Mk.III & L Mk.III	MONAB VIII
Mobile Servicing (MS) No. 15	Not known	MONAB IX
Mobile Servicing (MS) No. 16	Not known	MONAB IX
Mobile Servicing (MS) No. 17	Not known	MONAB X
Mobile Servicing (MS) No. 18	Not known	MONAB X
Mobile Servicing (MS) No. 19 - 28	Not known	intended for MONABs XI - XV but not formed

=== Component allocation table for Mobile Maintenance (MM) ===
Each Mobile Maintenance unit provided air maintenance on two or more types of aircraft, aligned to those types of aircraft of the accompanying Mobile Servicing units, as shown in the table below:

Mobile Maintenance
Unit designation	Supported aircraft types	Attached to
Mobile Maintenance (MM) No. 1	Grumman Avenger Mk.I & Mk.II, Vought Corsair Mk II & Mk IV, Grumman Hellcat F. Mk. I & F. Mk. II, Miles Martinet TT.Mk I	MONAB I (Detached to R.N. Forward Aircraft Pool, Pityliu 7 June 1945, returned 17 September 1945)
Mobile Maintenance (MM) No. 2	Vought Corsair Mk II & Mk IV, Grumman Hellcat F. Mk. I & F. Mk. II, Supermarine Seafire F Mk.III & L Mk.III	MONAB III
Mobile Maintenance (MM) No. 3	Grumman Avenger Mk.I & Mk.II, Fairey Firefly I, Supermarine Seafire F Mk.III & L Mk.III	MONAB IV
Mobile Maintenance (MM) No. 4	Grumman Avenger Mk.I & Mk.II, Vought Corsair Mk II & Mk IV, Miles Martinet TT.Mk I	MONAB V
Mobile Maintenance (MM) No. 5	Grumman Avenger Mk.I & Mk.II, Vought Corsair Mk II & Mk IV, Grumman Hellcat F. Mk. I & F. Mk. II, Supermarine Seafire F Mk.III & L Mk.III	MONAB VI
Mobile Maintenance (MM) No. 6	Grumman Avenger Mk.I & Mk.II, Vought Corsair Mk II & Mk IV, Supermarine Seafire F Mk.III & L Mk.III	MONAB VII
Mobile Maintenance (MM) No. 7	Vought Corsair Mk II & Mk IV, Fairey Firefly I, Supermarine Seafire F Mk.III & L Mk.III	MONAB VIII
Mobile Maintenance (MM) No. 8	Vought Corsair Mk II & Mk IV, Supermarine Seafire F Mk.III & L Mk.III	MONAB IX
Mobile Maintenance (MM) No. 9	Vought Corsair Mk II & Mk IV, Supermarine Seafire F Mk.III & L Mk.III	MONAB X
Mobile Maintenance (MM) No. 10	Vought Corsair Mk II & Mk IV, Supermarine Seafire F Mk.III & L Mk.III?	MONAB XI (not formed)
Mobile Maintenance (MM) No. 11-14	Planned for inclusion in MONABs XII - XV units scrapped before formation when the remaining MONABs were indefinitely shelved	

=== Component allocation table for Mobile Repair (MR) ===
Each Mobile Repair units provided a repair facility for a number of different aircraft types, as shown in the table below:

Mobile Repair
Unit designation	Supported aircraft types	Attached to
Mobile Repair (MR) No. 1	Vought Corsair Mk II & Mk IV, Fairey Firefly I, Grumman Hellcat F. Mk. I & F. Mk. II, Supermarine Seafire F Mk.III & L Mk.III (Originally planned for support of Grumman Avenger, Fairey Barracuda, Vultee Vengeance and Supermarine Sea Otter)	MONAB V. later MONAB I. Arrived at Nowra 10 April 1945
Mobile Repair (MR) No. 2	Grumman Avenger Mk.I & Mk.II, Beech Expeditor, Miles Martinet TT.Mk I, Supermarine Sea Otter I (Originally planned for support of Vought Corsair and Grumman Hellcat)	MONAB V, but transferred to MONAB VI from 5 November 1945
Mobile Repair (MR) No. 3	Unknown, probably Supermarine Seafire (all marks)	Originally intended for MONAB XI, but raised locally in Australia during November 1945 when MONAB VII was paid off and operated as part of TAMY I
Mobile Repair (MR) No. 4	Unknown	Intended for MONAB XII (unit assembled in the UK even though MONAB XII was cancelled). Retained by the MNAO as part of the post war MONAB X for trials & development work and installed at RNAS Milltown (satellite airfield) when the MNAO relocated to RNAS Lossiemouth, in 1946
Mobile Repair (MR) No. 5	Fairey Firefly & Supermarine Seafire	Intended for MONAB II at RNAS Schofields but probably never formed

=== Component allocation table for Mobile, Storage & Reserve (MSR) ===
Each Mobile, Storage & Reserve unit provided a repair facility for a number of different aircraft types, as shown in the table below:

Mobile Repair
Unit designation	Supported aircraft types	Attached to
Mobile, Storage & Reserve (MSR) No. 1	Grumman Avenger Mk.I & Mk.II, Vought Corsair Mk II & Mk IV, Grumman Hellcat F. Mk. I & F. Mk. II	MONAB V, transferred to MONAB I upon arrival in Australia. To Forward Aircraft Pool on Pityilu Island from 7 June and returned to RNAS Nowra on 17 October 1945.
Mobile, Storage & Reserve (MSR) No. 2	Supermarine Seafire F Mk.III & L Mk.III, Fairey Firefly I	MONAB V, temporarily attached to MONAB I upon arrival in Australia and transferred to MONAB V when the MONAB occupied RNAS Jervis Bay.
Mobile, Storage & Reserve (MSR) No. 3	Grumman Avenger Mk.I & Mk.II, Vought Corsair Mk II & Mk IV, Grumman Hellcat F. Mk. I & F. Mk. II, Fairey Firefly I, Supermarine Seafire F Mk.III & L Mk.III	Formed from the storage element of MONAB II at RNAS Bankstown, together with MSR Nos. 4, 7 & 8. Split into 'A' & 'B' units and embarked in HMS Unicorn and HMS Striker to provide an aircraft pool for the forward area.
Mobile, Storage & Reserve (MSR) No. 4	Grumman Avenger Mk.I & Mk.II, Vought Corsair Mk II & Mk IV, Grumman Hellcat F. Mk. I & F. Mk. II	Formed from the storage element of MONAB II at RNAS Bankstown, together with MSR Nos. 3, 7 & 8. Embarked in HMS Unicorn and HMS Speaker it was to be disembarked to USNAS Ponam to operate as part of MONAB IV. HMS Unicorn disembarked the vehicles and stores on 8 March, the remainder of the unit, along with the advance party of MONAB IV, disembarked from HMS Speaker on 15 March.
Mobile, Storage & Reserve (MSR) No. 5	(Original types) - Grumman Avenger Mk.I & Mk.II, Vought Corsair Mk II & Mk IV	Split into 'A' & 'B' sub-units & embarked in HMS Arbiter and HMS Chaser to act as the Forward Aircraft Pool, relieving HMS Unicorn and HMS Striker. The element installed in HMS Arbiter arrived on board around 15 May 1945, and remained until late September when it was disembarked to MONAB II. The unit reported at MONAB I by November 1945, personnel departed for the UK 6 December 1945 on RMS Aquitania.
Mobile, Storage & Reserve (MSR) No. 6	Fairey Firefly I, Supermarine Seafire F Mk.III & L Mk.III, Supermarine Sea Otter I	Formed at RNAE Risley. Disembarked from HMS Arbiter on 1 June 1945 to Ponam Island to operate as part of MONAB IV.
Mobile, Storage & Reserve (MSR) No. 7	Vought Corsair Mk II & Mk IV, Supermarine Seafire F Mk.III & L Mk.III, Grumman Hellcat F. Mk. I & F. Mk. II	Formed from the storage element of MONAB II at RNAS Bankstown, together with MSR Nos. 3, 4 & 8. Transferred to strength of TAMY 1 in early April 1945 after the yards arrival in Australia.
Mobile, Storage & Reserve (MSR) No.8	Vought Corsair Mk II & Mk IV, Supermarine Seafire F Mk.III & L Mk.III, Grumman Hellcat F. Mk. I & F. Mk. II	Formed from the storage element of MONAB II at RNAS Bankstown, together with MSR Nos. 3, 4 & 7. Transferred to strength of TAMY 1 in early April 1945 after the yards arrival in Australia.
Mobile, Storage & Reserve (MSR) No.9	Vought Corsair Mk II & Mk IV, Supermarine Seafire F Mk.III & L Mk.III, Fairey Firefly I	Formed in the UK in June 1945 and sailed with MONAB VIII for Australia. Arrived in Sydney following V-J Day then allocated to operate with MONAB VIII at RNAS Kai Tak, Hong Kong. Embarked in HMS Reaper for passage to Hong Kong, disembarking in late October.
Mobile, Storage & Reserve (MSR) No. 10	Unknown	Formed in the UK in July 1945, scheduled to sail with MONAB IX.
Mobile, Storage & Reserve (MSR) No.11	Unknown	Formed in the UK in August 1945 and scheduled for deployment with MONAB X in September. Both units were to remain in the UK.
Mobile, Storage & Reserve (MSR) No. 12	Unknown	Scheduled to form in September 1945 and sail in October with MONAB XI; both cancelled after V-J Day.

=== Component allocation table for Mobile Annexe (MA) ===
Mobile Annexe
Unit designation	Supported aircraft types	Attached to
Mobile Annexe No. 1	Uncertain, likely Vultee Vengeance TT.IV	MONAB IV
Mobile Annexe No. 2	Uncertain, likely Supermarine Sea Otter I	MONAB VI

=== Component allocation table for Mobile Air Torpedo Maintenance Unit (MATMU) ===
Mobile Annexe
Unit designation	Attached to
Mobile Air Torpedo Maintenance Unit No. 1	At RNAS Lossiemouth by 1946, used by the MNAO for trials and development work.
Mobile Air Torpedo Maintenance Unit No. 3	Arrived in Australia in March 1945. Established 8 miles from Jervis Bay. Operated as part of MONAB I, then later MONAB V at Nowra and Jervis Bay, but no torpedo training was done.
Mobile Air Torpedo Maintenance Unit No. 5	Unknown
Mobile Air Torpedo Maintenance Unit No. 6	Arrived in Australia in December 1944 and established at RAAF Nowra. Operated as part of MONAB I and later MONAB V.
Mobile Air Torpedo Maintenance Unit No. 7	Formed at RNAS Lee-on-Solent in October 1944, arrived in Australia early in 1945. Established near Jervis Bay to operate independently, demonstrating its capabilities and ability to function as a separate self-sustaining unit. Arrived at MONAB IV on Ponam Island 6 July - 7 October 1945, MONAB I and V at RNAS Nowra 30 October - 13 February 1946

== Miscellaneous components ==
List of miscellaneous components which were added to a MONAB, where required, when certain conditions dictated.

Standard Preservation Unit
Unit designation	Attached to / notes
Standard Preservation Unit No. 1	Mentioned in official reports; possibly supported all aircraft types. Likely a part of Receipt & Despatch MONAB or TAMY I - actual unit deployment not known.
Receipt & Despatch Unit specialist components
Aircraft Erection unit	One of each unit formed locally by MONAB II in Australia and one in the UK for MONAB VII. Essential component of Transportable Aircraft Maintenance Yard No.1
Aircraft Equipping unit	One of each unit formed locally by MONAB II in Australia and one in the UK for MONAB VII. Essential component of Transportable Aircraft Maintenance Yard No.1
Aircraft Stripping unit	One of each unit formed locally by MONAB II in Australia and one in the UK for MONAB VII. Essential component of Transportable Aircraft Maintenance Yard No.1
Mobile Malarial Hygiene Unit
Mobile Malarial Hygiene Unit No. 5	Attached to MONAB IV at RNAS Ponam, Admiralty Islands.
Mobile Malarial Hygiene Unit No. 7	Attached to MONAB VIII at RNAS Kai Tak, Hong Kong.

== See also ==
- List of Royal Navy shore establishments
- List of air stations of the Royal Navy
- Royal Navy Dockyard
- Seaplane bases in the United Kingdom
- Lists of military installations
- Operation Ivory Soap
