= Second World War RAAF Buildings, Maryborough Airport =

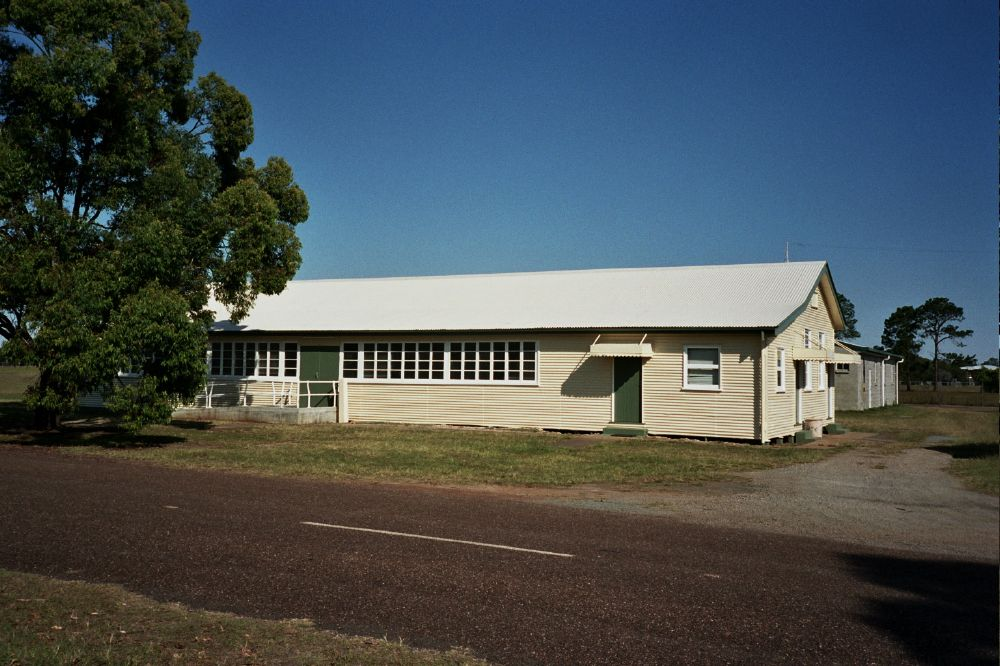
- Second World War RAAF Buildings, 2005

- Location within Queensland Location within Australia
- 25.5176°S 152.711°E
- Location: Saltwater Creek Road, Maryborough, Fraser Coast Region, Queensland, Australia

History
- Design period: 1939–1945 (World War II)
- Built: c. 1941–c. 1944

Queensland Heritage Register
- Official name: Second World War RAAF Buildings, Maryborough Airport
- Type: state heritage (built)
- Designated: 23 March 2007
- Reference no.: 602556
- Significant period: c. 1941–c. 1944 (fabric); 1941–1946 (historical)
- Significant components: hut/shack, store/s / storeroom / storehouse, garage, office/administration building, latrine, hangar, trees/plantings, hospital

Second World War RAAF Buildings is a heritage-listed group of air force base buildings at Saltwater Creek Road, Maryborough, Fraser Coast Region, Queensland, Australia. It was built from c. 1941 to c. 1944. It was added to the Queensland Heritage Register on 23 March 2007.

== History ==
The Second World War buildings at Maryborough airport were constructed during the early 1940s as part of the facilities of a military aerodrome serving Royal Australian Air Force (RAAF) No 3 Wireless Air Gunner School and No 3 Air Navigation School. Following the war, Maryborough City Council redeveloped the aerodrome as a civil airport retaining these buildings in use.

Maryborough was established in the late 1840s to supply sheep stations on the Burnett River and provide an outlet for their wool. The Port of Maryborough was a port of entry and during the 1860s and 1870s Maryborough flourished as the principal port of the nearby Gympie goldfield and as an outlet for timber and sugar. The establishment of manufacturing plants and primary industries sustained its growth as a major regional centre. As such, it had a small civil airfield before the Second World War.

In 1938, in response to the threatened outbreak of war, an Australian Air Force was developed, which included the establishment of a major base at Amberley in southern Queensland. Following the First World War and the development of civil aviation in the 1920s and 1930s, it had become apparent that air power would play an important role modern warfare. At the outbreak of war in 1939, urgent consideration was given not only to the construction of aeroplanes, but also to the training of technicians, pilots and aircrew. It was realised that although British factories could step up production of aeroplanes and equipment, it would not be able to train all of the aircrew needed to operate them.

The Empire Air Training Scheme (EATS) was set up in December 1939 and was an agreement between Britain and the Dominions, particularly Canada, Australia and New Zealand, for aircrews to be trained in those countries for service with the Royal Air Force. Australia agreed initially to provide 28,000 personnel over three years; a time span later extended, and eventually trained some 37,000 airmen. All Australian trainees did their initial training in Australia; 7/9ths completed their training here and 2/9ths doing advanced training overseas before being posted to squadrons involved in the defence of Britain and the conduct of the war in Europe, North Africa and the Mediterranean. The EATS scheme was conducted through 49 airfields in Australia, Queensland having EATS units at Amberley, Archerfield, Bundaberg, Kingaroy, Maryborough and Sandgate. Maryborough was chosen as a base for a Wireless Air Gunner School (3 WAGS) and an Air Navigation School (3 ANS).

The site was secured for RAAF use in December 1940 under the provisions of National Security (General) Regulations, but the existing airfield was inadequate and the Air Board set about acquiring more land to extend runways and facilities. The aerodrome covered an area of approximately 355 acres comprising the civil aerodrome on State land vested in the trusteeship of Maryborough City Council (133 acres), several holdings owned by the Council (84 acres), land held by 15 different private owners and public roads (138 acres). The land acquired was partially developed and included a sawmill, service station and several dairies. £257,928 was allocated for buildings, construction works, engineering services, furniture and fittings. By April 1941 the land was being cleared and runways and buildings constructed. The training school was opened 18 September 1941 and the first intake was on 16 November when work was still being carried out.

On 7 December 1941 the United States of America entered the war following the bombing of American ships by Japanese aircraft at Pearl Harbor in Hawaii. The EATS scheme was suspended for reassessment in response to the perceived threat to Australia. However, Australia initially had few planes and it was decided in February 1942 by the War Cabinet to continue the scheme but retain enough aircrew in Australia to crew home and Pacific based squadrons and recall some experienced aircrew. Australian and American personnel poured into Queensland as plans for the defence of Australia and the conduct of the war in the Pacific were quickly implemented.

The demand on materials, services and labour was beyond the scope of local resources and manufacture. Queensland had a small population and no heavy manufacturing, as the southern states had. The first buildings erected at the outbreak of war were "P" series huts, pre-cut of timber and galvanised iron and assembled on site. There are three huts of this type remaining at Maryborough. A prefabrication scheme was then proposed whereby components were made in the south, shipped to where they were needed and assembled on site. Designs took into account the scarcity of labour and of some materials. Bellman aircraft hangars were such prefabricated buildings and contracts were let for the construction of two Bellman hangars for Maryborough.

The war in the Pacific quickly escalated as the Philippines and Singapore were attacked by Japan. Darwin was first bombed on 19 February 1942 and 14,000 Australians were taken prisoner following the fall of Singapore in February 1942.

From April 1942, Maryborough's activities included Recruit Training. No 3 Recruit Depot operated at Maryborough until July 1943 and No 6 Recruit Depot from November 1944 to June 1945. These units gave basic training to about 4000 recruits. Women (WAAAFs) were also stationed at Maryborough.

The strategic air bases moved north following the theatres of the air campaign. The Battle of the Coral Sea took place in early May 1942 and the Battle of Midway in June 1942. Japanese troops landed at Gona on the north coast of Papua New Guinea on 21 July 1942. Hospitals at airfields were to be readied as field hospital for expected incoming battle casualties.

Maryborough aerodrome facilities were also used for airframe overhaul and a third and fourth Bellman hangar were erected at Maryborough sometime in 1944, though on 15 August 1944 it was decided to close number 3 WAGS Maryborough and train Wireless Operators at Ballarat instead. The facilities at the base were then used by RAAF 1 Radar School. The training school closed on closed on 6 December 1944.

Following the victory in Europe in May 1945 the Royal Navy formed the British Pacific Fleet. In June 1945 the unit HMS Nabstock arrived in Maryborough. This was a MONAB, a mobile naval air base for training crew and the assembly of aircraft for the British Pacific Fleet. A number of Fleet Air Arm squadrons were based in Maryborough until late 1945. The RAAF station was closed after the departure of the last of these, MONAB VI HMS Nabstock in November 1945.

Following the cessation of hostilities, control of the aerodrome was transferred to the Department of Civil Aviation on 31 July 1946. There were 127 buildings on site at its peak and all those not needed by Civil Aviation needs were processed for disposal. Civil Aviation elected to retain the hospital, motor transport garages, two hangars, a flight office, a workshop, store, inflammables store and two latrines. One of the hangars was later removed, though most of the selected buildings remain on site. Some concrete slabs and other traces of RAAF buildings can still be seen dotted about the airport. The runways have been resurfaced and the third cross strip existing during the war has gone. The tree lined entrance drive is still the main access to the airport.

The airport is owned and operated by Fraser Coast Regional Council (which replaced Maryborough City Council). It is an active civil facility regularly used by private and chartered aircraft, crop sprayers and maintenance enterprises and by the Maryborough Aero Club.

== Description ==
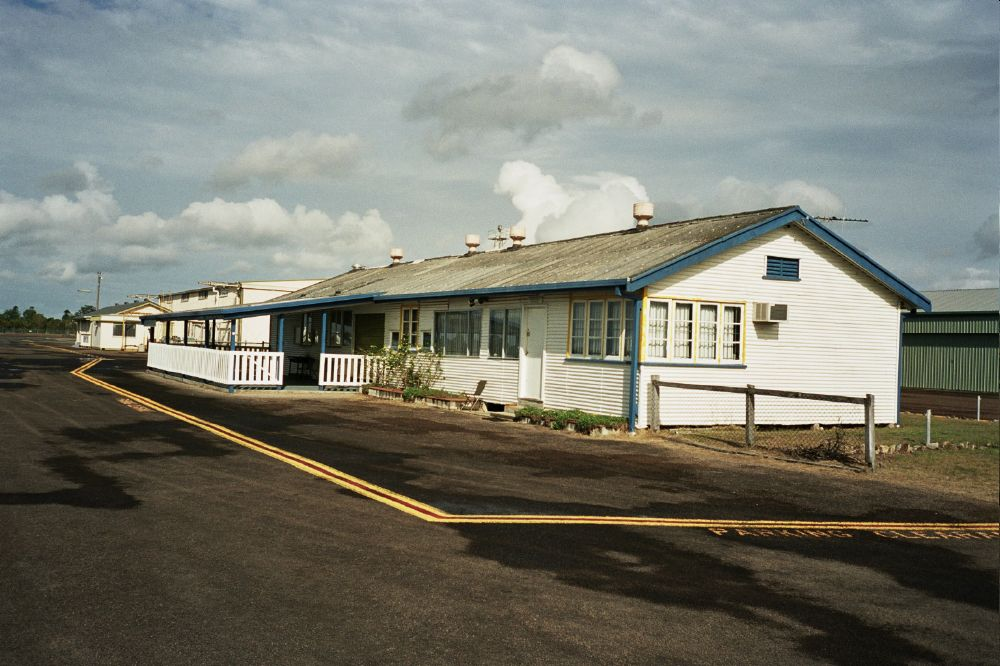
Second World War RAAF Buildings, 2006

The Maryborough Airport is located to the north west of the city centre off Saltwater Road. It has two runways; the main runway is bitumen surfaced and is 1,587 metres (5,207 ft) long. The cross strip is grassed and is 885 metres (2,904 ft) long.

There are trees dotted along the entrance road, though it is unknown if any of the trees are wartime plantings. To the left of the drive is an open area. To the right hand side of the drive is a row of Second World War structures. These comprise :

- Building A - the former inflammables store, is a small building, square in plan, and set on a concrete slab. It is clad in fibrous cement sheeting and has a hipped roof clad in corrugated iron and topped with a large ventilator. It is currently used for storage.
- Building B, the former Motor Transport Garage, is a rectangular building with a skillion roof. Its walls and roof are clad in corrugated iron and it has six narrow roller doors along the long axis facing away from the drive. It has casement windows on the northern side, two of which have sheet metal sunhoods with scalloped edges. It is now used for storage.
- Building C is a set of latrines and is a rectangular building clad in corrugated set on a concrete slab. It has a gabled roof clad in corrugated iron. There is a narrow band of glass louvres set below the eaves.
- Building D is an adapted P1 hut and was the former Hospital/Sick Quarters, now used for community purposes. It is a rectangular building set on low stumps and clad in horizontal corrugated iron. sheeting. It has a gabled roof clad in corrugated iron and what appears to have been a wide front verandah is now built in with casement windows. There is an extension at the rear. There are sheet metal canopies with scalloped edges suspended over the doors.
- Building E is also a P1 hut and was formerly used as a parachute-packing shed. It is now the airport terminal and has had some alterations made for this purpose, including the adding of a covered baggage area.

To the north of the terminal and near the edge of the tarmac are:

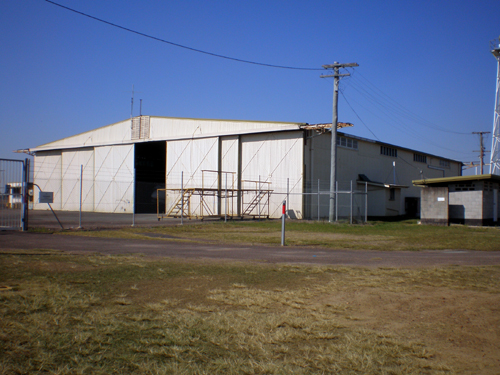
- Bellman hangar located at Maryborough Airport, 2010
  Building F, a Bellman aircraft hangar. This is a prefabricated galvanised iron structure with a concrete floor. It has a low-pitched gabled roof and large sliding doors running along channels across the front.
- Building G, which is also a P1 hut and is probably the most intact. It has a wide veranda facing the runways and was formerly a Flight Office. The Maryborough Aero Club now uses it.

== Heritage listing ==
The Second World War RAAF Buildings at Maryborough Airport was listed on the Queensland Heritage Register on 23 March 2007 having satisfied the following criteria.

The place is important in demonstrating the evolution or pattern of Queensland's history.

The surviving RAAF buildings at Maryborough airport are important in illustrating the measures taken for the training of aircrew during the Second World War under the Empire Air Training School scheme. Aircrew trained at Maryborough served with the RAF in many theatres of war and with the RAAF. The base was also used for training naval pilots to serve with the British Pacific Fleet.

The place demonstrates rare, uncommon or endangered aspects of Queensland's cultural heritage.

The Bellman hangar and field hospital are now uncommon in Queensland as examples of their type still in their original locations.

The place is important in demonstrating the principal characteristics of a particular class of cultural places.

Although most of the buildings that were on site during the Second World War have been removed, those remaining are indicative of the types of buildings and facilities constructed and which were necessary for the operation of a wartime air base. These include a hangar, flight office, field hospital, parachute packing shed, motor transport garage, inflammables store and latrines. In conjunction with wartime records and plans these buildings demonstrate the function of the aerodrome.
