= 724 Naval Air Squadron =

Inactive flying squadron of the Royal Navy's Fleet Air Arm

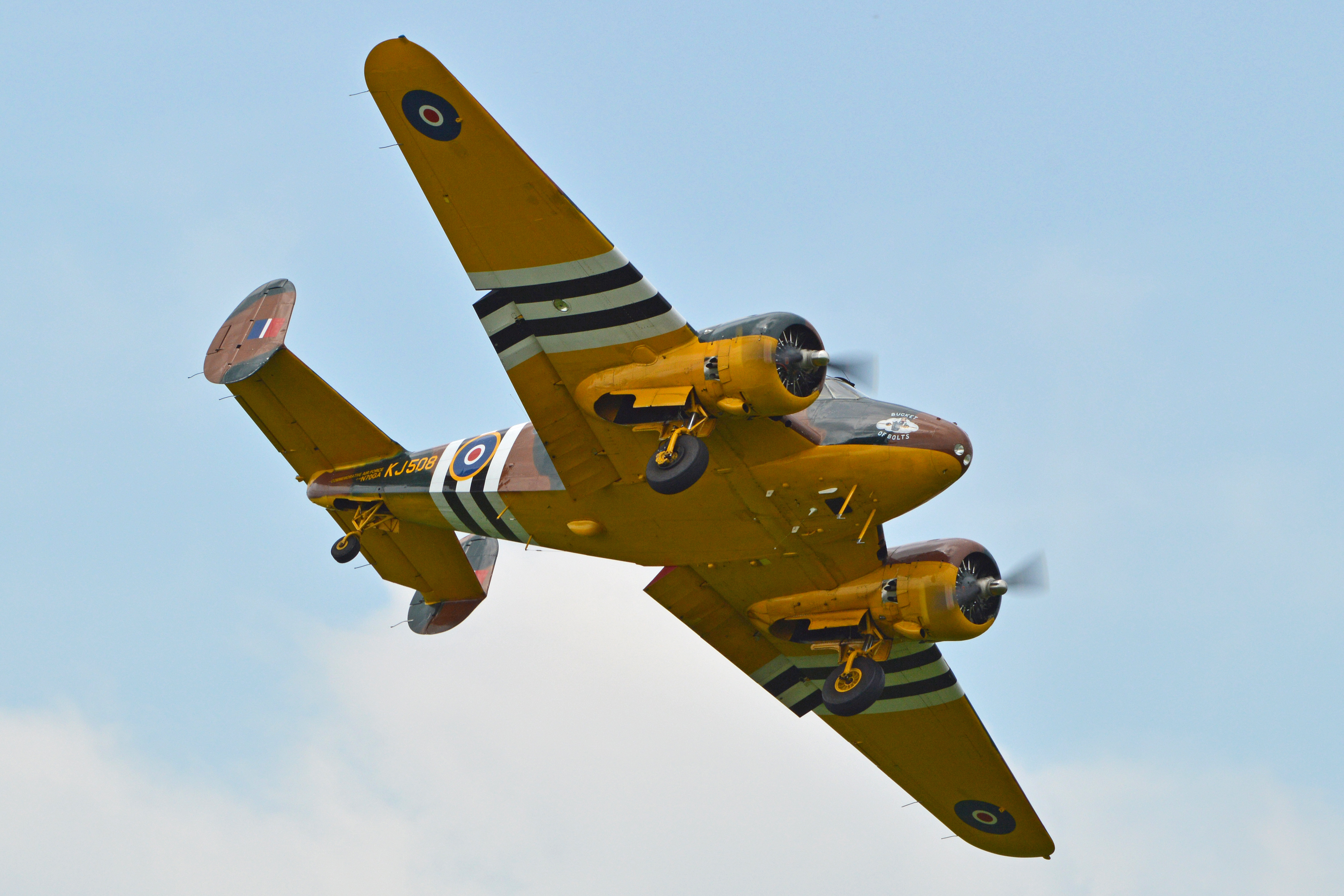
- Beech Expeditor; an example of the type used by 724 Squadron
- Active: 1945–1946
- Disbanded: 31 May 1946
- Country: United Kingdom
- Branch: Royal Navy
- Type: Fleet Air Arm Second Line Squadron
- Role: Communications Squadron
- Size: Squadron
- Part of: Fleet Air Arm
- Home station: See Naval air stations section for full list.
- Aircraft: See Aircraft flown section for full list.

724 Naval Air Squadron (724 NAS), sometimes called 724 Squadron, was a Fleet Air Arm (FAA) naval air squadron of the United Kingdom’s Royal Navy (RN). Established as a naval air Communications Squadron at MONAB II, HMS Nabberley, RNAS Bankstown in New South Wales, it operated using Beech Expeditor and Avro Anson aircraft. Subsequently, it moved to MONAB III, HMS Nabthorpe, RNAS Schofields, New South Wales, where it ultimately disbanded.

The squadron was reformed for the Royal Australian Navy's Fleet Air Arm as 724 Squadron RAN on 1 June 1955.

== History ==
=== Communications squadron (1945-1946) ===
724 Naval Air Squadron was commissioned at Mobile Operational Naval Air Base (MONAB) II, also known as RNAS Bankstown (HMS Nabberley), New South Wales, Australia, on 10 April 1945, to perform communications duties. Their initial equipment consisted of two Beech Expeditor II’s, a trainer, transport and utility aircraft, which were transferred from 723 Squadron, and two Avro Anson Mk.I’s, a multirole training aircraft. This unit operated from the nearby civil airport at Mascot, New South Wales, as the grass surface at HMS Nabberley was not suitable for the heavy twin-engine aircraft.

Starting in May, the squadron commenced a service to Melbourne, Victoria, five days a week, while also operating three days a week to Transportable Aircraft Maintenance Yard (TAMY) I, situated at RNAS Archerfield (HMS Nabsford), Queensland. In January 1946, the HMS Nabsford service was expanded to include an overnight stop before proceeding to MONAB VI at RNAS Maryborough (HMS Nabstock), Queensland. Subsequently, eight days later, the Melbourne service was upgraded to a daily operation. In June, a new twice-daily service to MONAB V at RNAS Jervis Bay (HMS Nabswick), Jervis Bay Territory and MONAB I at RNAS Nowra (HMS Nabbington), New South Wales, was launched, functioning six days a week.

When HMS Nabberley paid off in March 1946 the squadron moved to MONAB III, located at RNAS Schofields (HMS Nabthorpe), New South Wales, where it disbanded on 31 May 1946.

== Aircraft flown ==
The squadron has flown two different aircraft types:

- Avro Anson Mk I multirole training aircraft (May 1945 - January 1946)
- Beech Expeditor II trainer, transport and utility aircraft (April 1945 - May 1946)

== Naval air stations ==
724 Naval Air Squadron operated from a couple of naval air stations of the Royal Navy and one other airbase overseas:

- Royal Naval Air Station Bankstown (HMS Nabberley), New South Wales
  - (aircraft based Mascot Airport, New South Wales) (10 April 1945 - 31 March 1946
- Royal Naval Air Station Schofelds (HMS Nabthorpe), New South Wales, (31 March - 31 May 1946)
- disbanded - (31 May 1946)

== Commanding officers ==
List of commanding officers of 724 Naval Air Squadron, with date of appointment:

- Lieutenant(A) J.H.L. Evans, RNVR, from 10 April 1945
- disbanded - 31 May 1946

Note: Abbreviation (A) signifies Air Branch of the RN or RNVR.
