= HMS Nabberley =

Mobile Operational Naval Air Base (MONAB) of the Royal Navy

HMS Nabberley Mobile Operational Naval Air Base II
- at Bankstown Airport, Sydney in Australia

Site information
- Type: Mobile Operational Naval Air Base
- Owner: Australian Ministry of Defence
- Operator: Royal Navy
- Controlled by: Fleet Air Arm
- Condition: now Bankstown Airport

Location
- Location within New South Wales HMS Nabberley (Australia)
- Coordinates: 33°55′30″S 150°59′18″E

Site history
- In use: 1945 – 1946
- Fate: MONAB decommissioned and removed
- Battles/wars: World War II; Pacific War

Garrison information
- Garrison: MONAB II
- Occupants: Flying units: 724 Communications Squadron; Support functions: Receipt & Despatch Unit; Aircraft Erection Unit; Aircraft Equipping & Modification Unit; Aircraft Storage Unit

Airfield information
- Elevation: 25 feet (7.6 m) AMSL
Runways
Direction	Length and surface
NE/SW	2,000 yards (1,829 m) (extension) Grass
NW/SE	2,000 yards (1,829 m) (extension) Grass
- Source: Royal Navy Research Archive

HMS Nabberley was a Royal Navy (RN), Mobile Operational Naval Air Base (MONAB) at the Royal Australian Air Force (RAAF) base RAAF Bankstown in Sydney, Australia. HMS Nabberley was also known as MONAB II and Royal Naval Air Station Bankstown (or RNAS Bankstown).

== History ==
Assembled at RNAS Ludham and Royal Navy Air Establishment Risley, Warrington, in October 1944. The duties of HMS Nabberley were changed from that of a MONAB to that of a Receipt and Dispatch Unit shortly after formation causing some administration problems. Due to accommodation issues 600 ratings were based at HMS Gosling, in Warrington, Lancashire. HMS Nabberley commissioned as an independent command on 18 November 1944.

The stores, equipment and vehicles sailed from Gladstone Dock, Liverpool on 20 November upon SS Perthshire (LS 1974) and personnel of MONAB II, in company with elements from HMS Nabthorpe and other units sailed from Liverpool upon RMS Athlone Castle on 22 December 1944 for passage to Australia.

HMS Unicorn carrying an advance party of MONAB II arrived in Sydney on 1 December 1944. The advance party arrived at RAAF Bankstown, together with 16 crated aircraft (8 Corsair IIs and 8 Martinet TT.Is) requisitioned from the Royal Navy Aircraft Depot at Cochin, India. The aircraft were assembled with RAAF assistance and the first aircraft assembled (Corsair II JT537) was test flown on 18 January 1945.

After the main party arrived in Sydney on 25 January 1945, some proceeded directly to Bankstown, however most were temporarily accommodated Warwick Farm Racecourse (Camp Warwick), a part of HMS Golden Hind, the Royal Navy barracks in Sydney, until accommodation was sorted out.

RAAF Bankstown was officially transferred on a loan basis to Royal Navy on 27 January 1945 and stores and equipment began to arrive at the station. The base was commissioned as HMS Nabberley, RNAS Bankstown on 29 January 1945.

The personnel began assembling crated aircraft and carrying out pre-issue test flights as a Receipt and Dispatch Unit. A total of 2,500 test flights were undertaken during the operation of HMS Nabberley.

On 14 May 1830 and 1833, Naval Air Squadrons disembarked from HMS Illustrious, where their Vought Corsair Mk II aircraft were subsequently withdrawn at HMS Nabberley. The members of 1833 Naval Air Squadron re-boarded the aircraft carrier on the same day, while those from 1830 Naval Air Squadron rejoined on 24 May, aligning with HMS Illustrious's departure for the United Kingdom.

Prince Henry, Duke of Gloucester, the Governor-General of Australia, toured the facility on 1 June 1945.

On 23 August 1945 the aircraft from the disbanded 1834 and 1835 squadrons were delivered from HMS Victorious for disposal.

HMS Nabberley, MONAB II, was paid off on 31 March 1946. 724 Naval Air Squadron, the communications unit, left and flew to RNAS Schofields (HMS Nabthorpe), the location of MONAB III. The airfield at Bankstown was returned to RAAF control.

== Units based at HMS Nabberley ==
List of units associated with MONAB II, in support of a Receipt & Despatch Unit and a Fleet Requirements Unit:

=== Function ===
- Receipt & Despatch Unit
- 724 Naval Air Communications Squadron

=== Aviation support components ===
- Aircraft Erection Unit
- Aircraft Equipping & Modification Unit
- Aircraft Storage Unit

=== Aircraft type supported ===
- Grumman Avenger Mk.I & II
- Vought Corsair Mk II & IV
- Beech Expeditor II
- Fairey Firefly I
- Grumman Hellcat F. Mk. I & II
- Miles Martinet TT.Mk I
- Stinson Reliant I
- Supermarine Seafire F Mk III & L Mk III
- Supermarine Sea Otter I
- de Havilland Tiger Moth I
- Vultee Vengeance TT.IV

== Squadrons at HMS Nabberley ==
List of Fleet Air Arm first and second line squadrons, station flight and other flying units either based at or disembarked to RNAS Bankstown (HMS Nabberley) and MONAB II:

=== Based squadrons ===
- 723 Naval Air Squadron was assigned as a Fleet Requirements Unit. It formed here on 28 February 1945. It was issued with eight Miles Martinet TT.Mk I target tug aircraft, eight Vought Corsair Mk II fighter-bomber aircraft and two Beech Expeditor II utility aircraft. It moved to RNAS Jervis Bay (HMS Nabswick) on 1 May 1945.
- 724 Naval Air Squadron was a Communications Squadron. It formed here on 10 April 1945 and was issued with two Avro Anson I multi-role aircraft, and two Beech Expeditor II (it operated out of the nearby Mascot Airport). It moved to RNAS Schofields (HMS Nabthorpe) on 31 March 1946.
- 1701 Naval Air Squadron an Air Sea Rescue squadron equipped with Supermarine Sea Otter. 'A' Flight was detached from RNAS Maryborough (HMS Nabstock) between 24 July – 7 August and 15 – 21 October 1945)

=== Disembarked squadrons ===
==== Fighter Squadrons ====
- 1830 Naval Air Squadron was a Single Seat Fighter squadron equipped with Vought Corsair Mk II. It disembarked from HMS Illustrious on 14 May 1945. The aircraft were withdrawn and personnel re-joined HMS Illustrious for passage to the UK.
- 1833 Naval Air Squadron was a Single Seat Fighter squadron equipped with Vought Corsair Mk II. It disembarked from HMS Illustrious on 14 May 1945. The aircraft were withdrawn and personnel re-joined HMS Illustrious for passage to the UK.
- 1834 Naval Air Squadron was a Single Seat Fighter squadron. Ex HMS Victorious, its Vought Corsair aircraft arrived from RNAS Maryborough (HMS Nabstock) on 23 August 1945 for disposal.
- 1836 Naval Air Squadron was a Single Seat Fighter squadron. Ex HMS Victorious, its Vought Corsair aircraft arrived from RNAS Maryborough (HMS Nabstock) on 23 August 1945 for disposal.

== Aircraft carriers disembarked from/embarked to ==
- HMS Illustrious

== Satellite airfields ==
- Nil
