= 723 Naval Air Squadron =

Inactive flying squadron of the Royal Navy's Fleet Air Arm

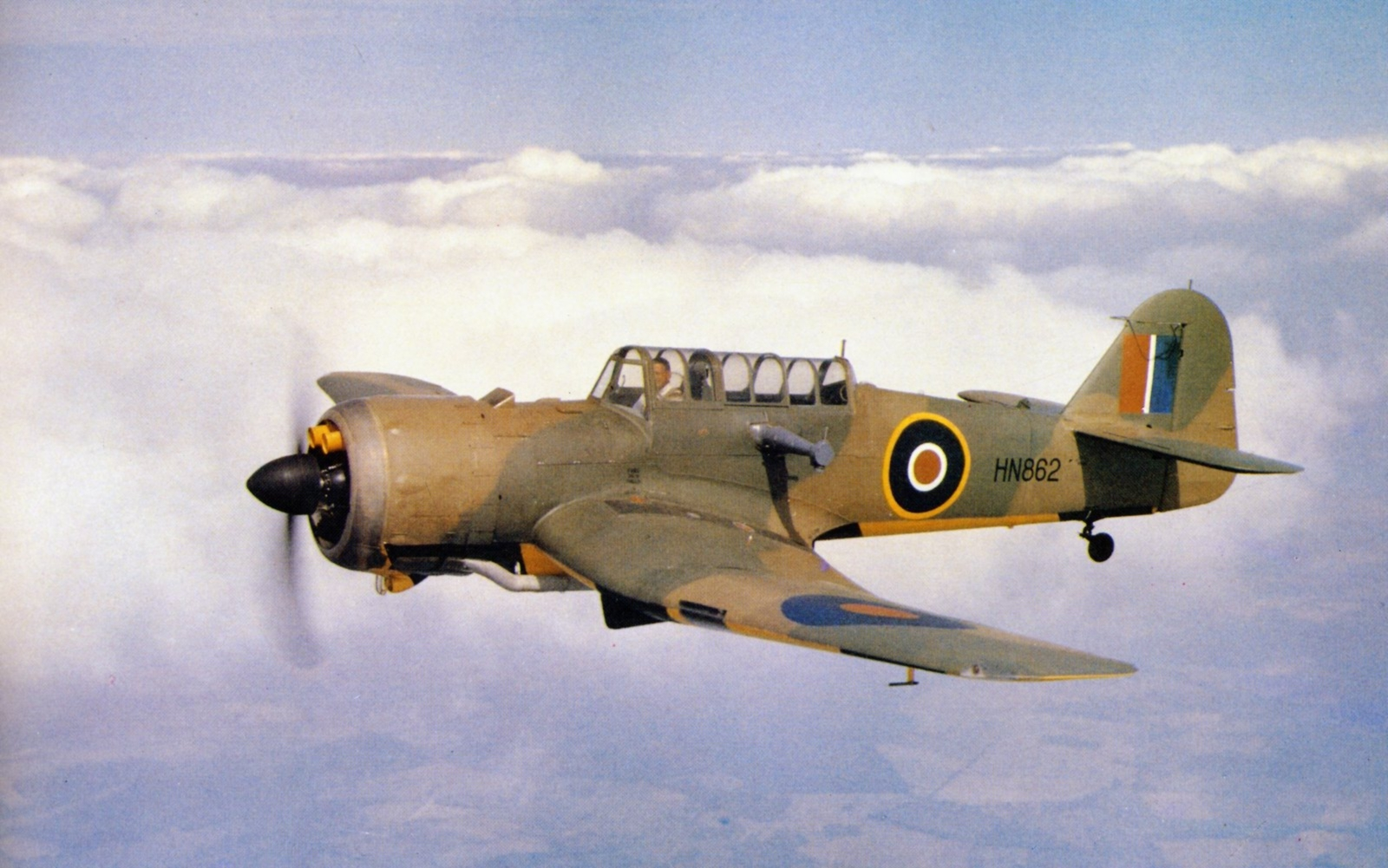
- Miles Martinet TT Mk I; an example of the type used by 723 Squadron
- Active: 1945–1946
- Disbanded: 31 May 1946
- Country: United Kingdom
- Branch: Royal Navy
- Type: Fleet Air Arm Second Line Squadron
- Role: Fleet Requirements Unit
- Size: Squadron
- Part of: Fleet Air Arm
- Home station: See Naval air stations section for full list.
- Aircraft: See Aircraft flown section for full list.

Insignia
- Identification Markings: N8A+ (All types 1945-46)

723 Naval Air Squadron (723 NAS), sometimes called 723 Squadron, was a Fleet Air Arm (FAA) naval air squadron of the United Kingdom's Royal Navy (RN). The squadron formed at MONAB II, HMS Nabberley at RAAF Bankstown, New South Wales, in February 1945, as a Fleet Requirements Unit to assist units of the British Pacific Fleet working up in Jervis Bay. It operated Miles Martinet, Vought Corsair, Beech Expeditor, Stinson Reliant, Avro Anson and de Havilland Tiger Moth. After the war ended, the squadron moved to MONAB VI, HMS Nabstock, at RAAF Station Schofields and later disbanded the following year.

The squadron was reformed for the Royal Australian Navy's Fleet Air Arm as 723 Squadron RAN on 7 April 1952.

== History ==
=== Fleet Requirements Unit (1945-1946) ===
On 21 November 1944 the personnel for 723 Naval Air Squadron gathered at HMS Waxwing, which served as the Fleet Air Arm Transit Camp, Royal Naval Air Establishment (RNAE) Townhill, Dunfermline, Fife, for passage to Australia.

Upon their arrival in Sydney on 27 January 1945, the squadron convened at RNAS Nowra, New South Wales, which had recently been established as a Royal Naval Air Station by MONAB I. Following this, MONAB II assumed control of RAAF Bankstown, Sydney, on 29 January and was commissioned as HMS Nabberley. Once fully operational as a Fleet Air Arm Receipt and Dispatch Unit, the squadron personnel officially formed a Fleet Requirements Unit on 28 February 1945, under the command of Lieutenant Commander(A) H.A.P. Bullivant, RNVR.

The primary function of the unit was to support the British Pacific Fleet as it conducted operations in Jervis Bay. While HMS Nabberley served as a grass airfield, the squadron predominantly operated from HMS Nabbington, where the tarmac runways, though designated as such, were quite basic in quality. The initial fleet comprised eight Miles Martinets and eight Vought Corsairs.

Initially, one or two Beech Expeditors were utilised for operations, with plans to incorporate Bristol Beaufighter Mk.IIFs, for which twelve units were allocated in July; however, these aircraft never materialised. The conversion of two former Royal Australian Air Force (RAAF) Avro Ansons for anti-jamming and radar training took longer than anticipated, resulting in their absence as well. Subsequently, a few Stinson Reliants and a couple of Australian de Havilland Tiger Moths were added to the squadron, and eventually, two Avro Ansons did arrive.

In November 1945, the Royal Navy began to reduce its presence in the Pacific theatre. On 15 November, MONAB I, HMS Nabbington, was officially decommissioned. Subsequently, 723 Squadron relocated to MONAB VI, RNAS Schofields (HMS Nabstock), on 21 January 1946, with the squadron ultimately ceasing operations on 31 May 1946.

== Aircraft flown ==
The squadron has flown a number of different aircraft types, including:

- Beech Expeditor II trainer, transport and utility aircraft (February - April 1945)
- Vought Corsair Mk II fighter-bomber (February - December 1945)
- Stinson Reliant liaison and training aircraft (February - December 1945)
- Miles Martinet TT Mk I target tug aircraft (February 1945 - May 1946)
- Avro Anson Mk I multirole training aircraft (May 1945 - February 1946)
- de Havilland Tiger Moth training aircraft (August 1945)
- CAC Wirraway training aircraft (September 1945)

== Naval air stations ==
725 Naval Air Squadron operated from a number of naval air stations of the Royal Navy:

- Royal Naval Air Station Bankstown (HMS Nabberley), New South Wales, (28 February - 1 May 1945)
- Royal Naval Air Station Jervis Bay (HMS Nabswick), Jervis Bay Territory, (1 May - 4 June 1945)
- Royal Naval Air Station Nowra (HMS Nabbington), New South Wales, (4 June 1945 - 1 January 1946)
  - Royal Naval Air Station Schofields (HMS Nabthorpe), New South Wales, (Detachment September - December 1945)
- Royal Naval Air Station Schofields (HMS Nabthorpe), New South Wales, (1 January - 31 May 1946)
- disbanded - (31 May 1946)

== Commanding officers ==
List of commanding officers of 723 Naval Air Squadron, with date of appointment:

- Lieutenant Commander(A) H.A.P. Bullivant, RNR, from 28 February 1945
- Lieutenant(A) G.H. Horne, RNVR, from 11 February 1946
- disbanded - 31 May 1946

Note: Abbreviation (A) signifies Air Branch of the RN or RNVR.
