= Bankstown Airport Air Traffic Control Tower =

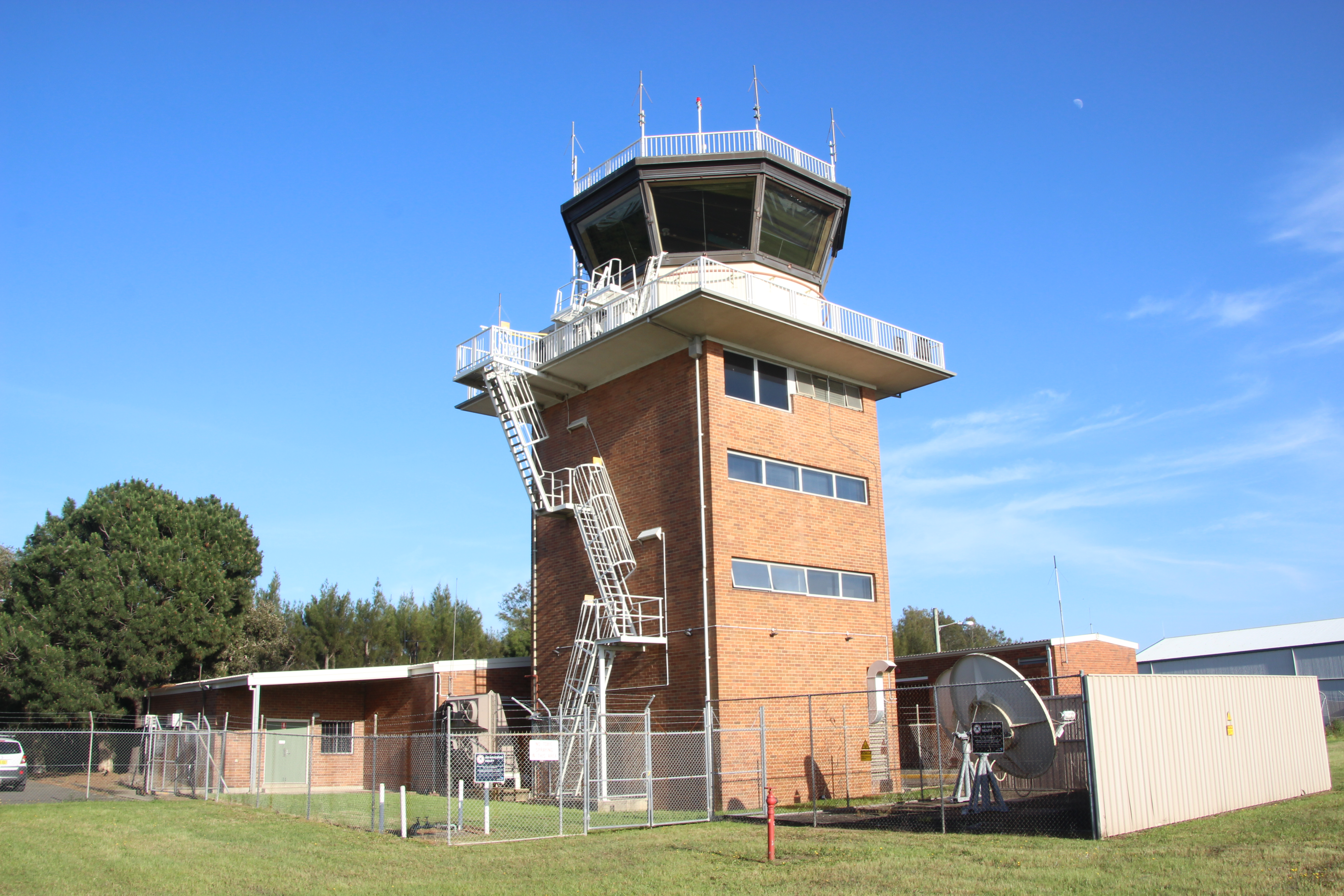
- The control tower in October 2018

- Location within Sydney
- 33.9217°S 150.9819°E
- Location: Tower Road, Bankstown, Sydney, Australia

Commonwealth Heritage List
- Official name: Bankstown Airport Air Traffic Control Tower
- Type: Listed place (Historic)
- Designated: 22 January 2016
- Reference no.: 106118

The Bankstown Airport Air Traffic Control Tower is a heritage-listed air traffic control tower at Tower Road, Bankstown, Sydney, Australia.

== History ==
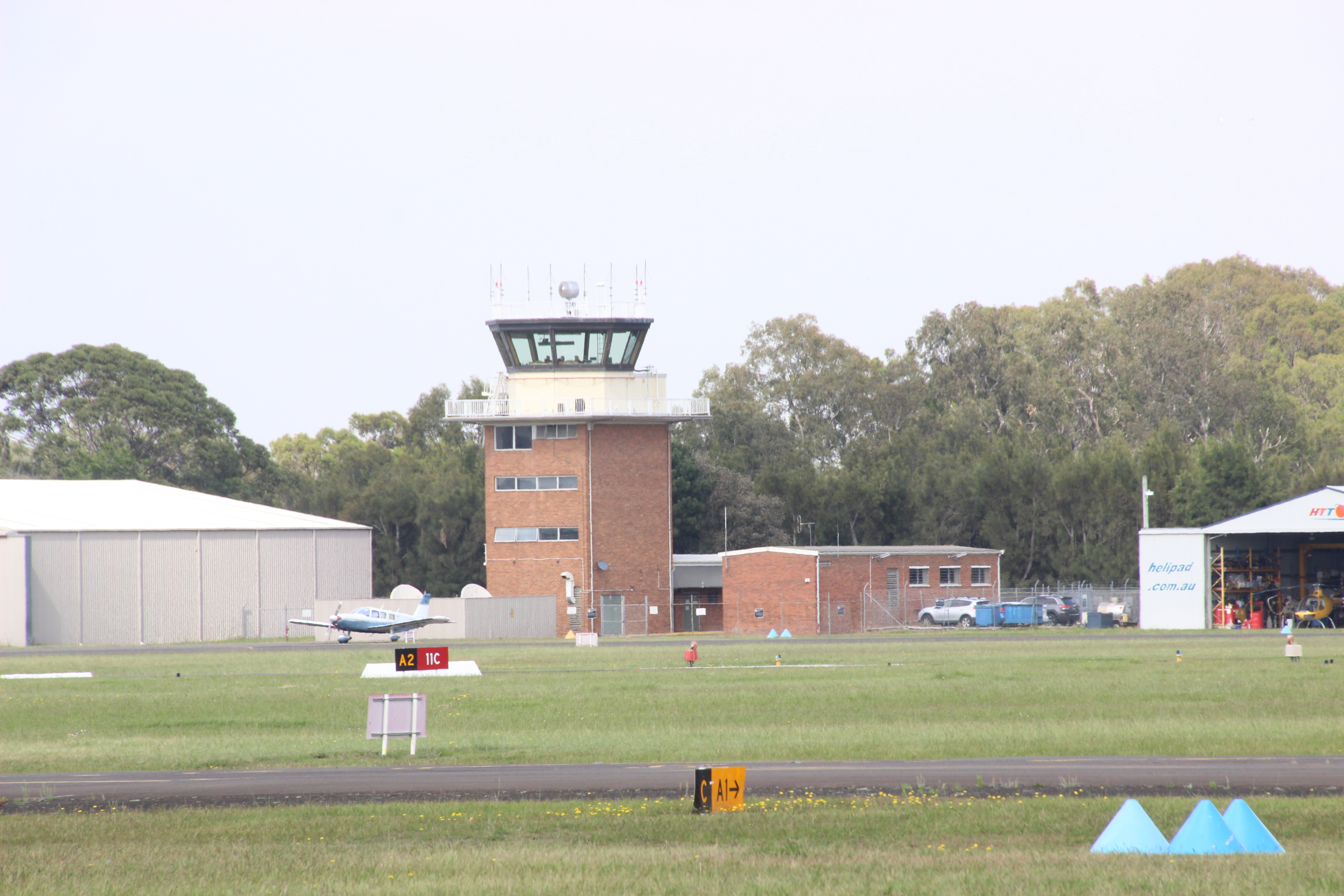
The control tower sits among more modern hangars on the western side of the airport

From the early 1950s the use of Bankstown Airport increased dramatically: annual movements rose from 100,000 to 280,000 between 1962 and 1967. By the mid-1960s, Bankstown was widely recognised as the headquarters of Australia's general aviation industry. Improvements to the airport over this period included: a sealed 941m-long runway (1952); a 1,190m-long sealed runway (1962); the installation of runway lighting (1965); and a third sealed runway (914m).

On 5 July 1968, the Department of Civil Aviation announced that a new 60 ft-high air traffic control tower, with associated powerhouse and equipment would be built at Bankstown (combined cost $250,000) on the western side of the airport, opposite the site of the Royal Australian Air Force control tower. In its siting and facilities the new tower conformed to Master Facility Schedule (MFS) no. 18 (issue 2, May 1967), specifying requirements for standard facilities in control towers and stating principles to be observed in the preparation of control tower unit facility schedules.

The complex was commissioned in 1970.

== Description ==
Bankstown Airport Air Traffic Control Tower occupies approximately 300 square metres (3,200 sq ft) on Tower Road, Bankstown Airport, comprising the air traffic control tower and its base building located within Land Parcel 17/DP1071297. The ATC tower, powerhouse and equipment room are located to the west of the airport. The complex is enclosed in a fence of cyclone and barbed wire, with a pedestrian entry to the north-west of the enclosure. Additions to the complex since the late-1960s include a single-storey, skillion-roofed extension that abuts the west end of the tower's south elevation (this building is not part of the ATC facility), and a satellite dish enclosure to the east, built in 1992. The floor of the cabin is 15 metres (49 ft) above ground level.

=== Exterior ===
Bankstown ATC tower is composed of a square four-storey base in reinforced concrete with a face brick cladding, below a rectangular cantilevered walkway, also in reinforced concrete, around an octagonal cabin. The cabin is raised on a part-chamfered half-height duct and service space and octagonal cabin.

The tower is built on standard raft footings, with a central stair in reinforced concrete. A single-storey brick wing (radio equipment room) extends westward from the tower base and a power house is located a short distance to the north. Both are original components of the ATC complex and appear to be intact externally.

The first, second and third floor levels of the east elevation of the ATC tower, facing the apron, feature narrow horizontal metal-framed casement windows running almost the full width of the building. There are no openings to the ground floor, with the exception of a vent to the west. The windows to the first and second storeys feature three regularly spaced mullions. At third floor level these have been altered including the introduction of larger vertically oriented windows on the south side and possibly the replacement of the original framing.

The south elevation is blank with no openings. A modern steel fire escape connects the walkway above to the ground level. The escape ladder appears to be of recent origins and may be a replacement for an earlier version (no escape ladder is indicated on the 1968 drawings). The west elevation, facing the road, features paired metal-framed casement windows lighting the internal stair. The main entrance to the building is on this side of the building and is via a simple timber door. The door is at the east end of a covered walkway formed by the overhanging eave of the radio equipment room, whose east elevation abuts the tower base. There is no internal connection between the two.

As for the south elevation, the north elevation is blank other than for access doors to the air conditioning plant room at ground floor level. Above third floor level the walkway around the base of the cabin (at crawl space level) is enclosed with original painted steel balustrading. The flooring is a waterproof membrane.

The cabin windows are double-glazed and canted outward. In the event of an emergency, the three windows facing west can be opened externally, by means of a hydraulically operated mechanism mounted on the west-facing facet of the crawl space wall. The rooftop features a central mounted beacon, and various antennae and aerials. Like the walkway, it is enclosed with linked steel gate panels clipped together.

=== Interior ===
As built, the tower accommodated a switch room and technical officer's room on the first floor; the office of the officer-in-charge and check controller's room on the second floor; and a staff locker room and toilets/showers on the third floor. Floors throughout were vinyl tiles, and concrete walls were painted white. There have been very few modifications to the building's interior.

The bulk (approximately 60 per cent) of the ground floor plan is dedicated to the air conditioning plant room, which is separated from the entrance lobby by a load-bearing concrete wall painted white. The concrete floor of the entrance lobby is finished in vinyl tiles, as are the treads of the concrete staircase that runs the height of the building. The balustrades throughout are white-painted metal, with the handrail coated in black plastic. The ground floor is higher than levels 1–3, possibly to accommodate the air conditioning plant, or for the height of the cabin to achieve the required sightlines over the apron.

The layout of the first, second and third floors are almost identical. A doorway to the east of the staircase leads to a lobby area that provides access to two rooms facing east. On the second and third levels there is a small store in the north-west corner, accessed from the lobby. On the first floor, a locker room has been built into this space (which was originally open), accessed through a fire door in the plaster partition wall at the top of the stairs. Duct voids are located to the north and south walls. The toilets and showers on the third floor were upgraded in 2004/05.

A flight of stairs from the third floor leads to the duct and walkway level. A door to the left of the stairs leads to a galley kitchen with a half-height door (to the duct space) to the east and a full-height door (to the walkway) to the west.

With the exception of upgrades to finishes and fabric, and modifications to accommodate technical changes, the control cabin is intact as built. The frame of the central timber console is original. The canted double glazed cavity windows are lined with felt. Demisting is by electrical metal heaters mounted at the base of the double glazing. The ceiling treatment of acoustic tiles is original. The circular visor track is extant, with the screen removed. Sun shading is now provided by pull down blinds fixed to the top of each of the windows. The floor is carpeted; the carpet may conceal the original rubber tiles. Archive photography dated 1974 appear to show the walls finished in perforated plasterboard; this may be concealed behind the present carpet. A metal safety bar has been installed at the top of the stairs.

=== Condition ===
The ATC tower and cabin are largely intact as constructed. The only change to the exterior is the modification of the third floor windows on the east elevation. The interior is likewise intact in both plan form and fabric, albeit with minor upgrades. The cabin is an authentic Department of Civil Aviation standard issue control cabin c. late-1960s. It includes the original console, which has been modified to accommodate upgrades and later technologies. The acoustic treatments to the walls, ceiling and floor are extant. The associated equipment room and power house also appear to be intact, at least externally.

== Heritage listing ==
Bankstown Airport Air Traffic Control Tower was listed on the Australian Commonwealth Heritage List on 22 January 2016 having satisfied the following criteria.

Criterion D: Characteristic values

Bankstown Air Traffic Control (ATC) tower is of historical significance in a national context as a representative and substantially intact example of a standardised air traffic control tower form dating from the first phase of post-World War II design in air traffic control facilities (1950s-late 1960s). The Bankstown air traffic control tower, together with its equipment room and powerhouse, was designed by the Government of Australia's Department of Works (NSW branch) for the Department of Civil Aviation. The complex was commissioned in 1970. The control tower is a utilitarian design comprising a square four-storey base in reinforced concrete with a face brick cladding, below a rectangular cantilevered walkway, also in reinforced concrete, around an octagonal cabin. The cabin is raised on a part-chamfered half-height duct and service space and octagonal cabin.

Bankstown is one of a group of control towers built essentially to the same operational and technical standards and specifications across Australia and Papua New Guinea from the 1950s until the late-1960s, when perimeter frame towers became the standard model for control towers at secondary and general aviation airports in Australia. Its design is derived from the 1950s air traffic control towers (Essendon, Hobart, Launceston and others), a design approach that was repeated and refined through the 1960s. While a late example of this standard type, Bankstown is distinguished from the majority of other surviving comparisons through its relative intactness. Other than for the modification of windows at the upper level on the eastern elevation, the building is intact externally; internally it also retains the majority of its plan form and fabric. It is unusual in retaining its original timber-framed console, albeit modified. The associated radio equipment room and power house are also intact externally.
