= Maryborough Airport (Queensland) =

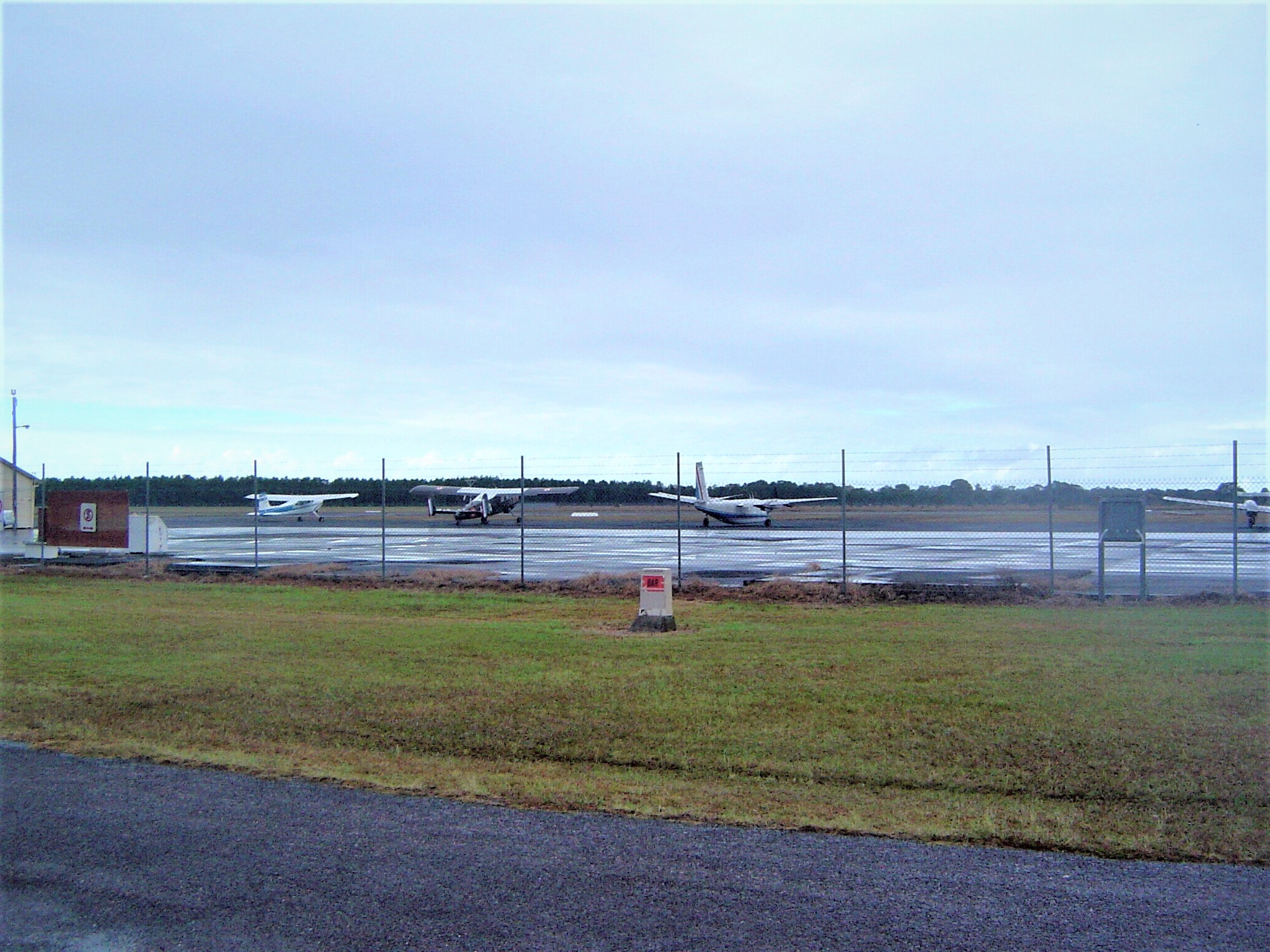
- IATA: MBH; ICAO: YMYB

Summary
- Airport type: Public
- Operator: Fraser Coast Regional Council
- Serves: Maryborough, Queensland, Australia
- Elevation AMSL: 38 ft / 12 m
- Coordinates: 25°30′46.3″S 152°42′48.8″E

Map
- Location in Queensland

Runways
Direction	Length		Surface
Direction	m	ft	Surface
12/30	885	2,904	Grass
17/35	1,587	5,207	Asphalt
- Sources: Australian AIP and aerodrome chart

Maryborough Airport (IATA: MBH, ICAO: YMYB) is located approximately 3 km (1.9 mi) north of the town centre. It serves as a small regional airport serving Maryborough and nearby townships. However, increasing competition with Hervey Bay Airport has led to a decrease in commercial air traffic.

The airport is primarily used by the Maryborough Aero Club, a flight school and (in development) an aviation museum.

The airport was used by the Royal Australian Air Force during World War II; the buildings constructed for the RAAF are now listed on the Queensland Heritage Register.

== See also ==
- List of airports in Queensland
