= Bankstown Airport =

Australian airport

Bankstown Airport Sydney–Bankstown

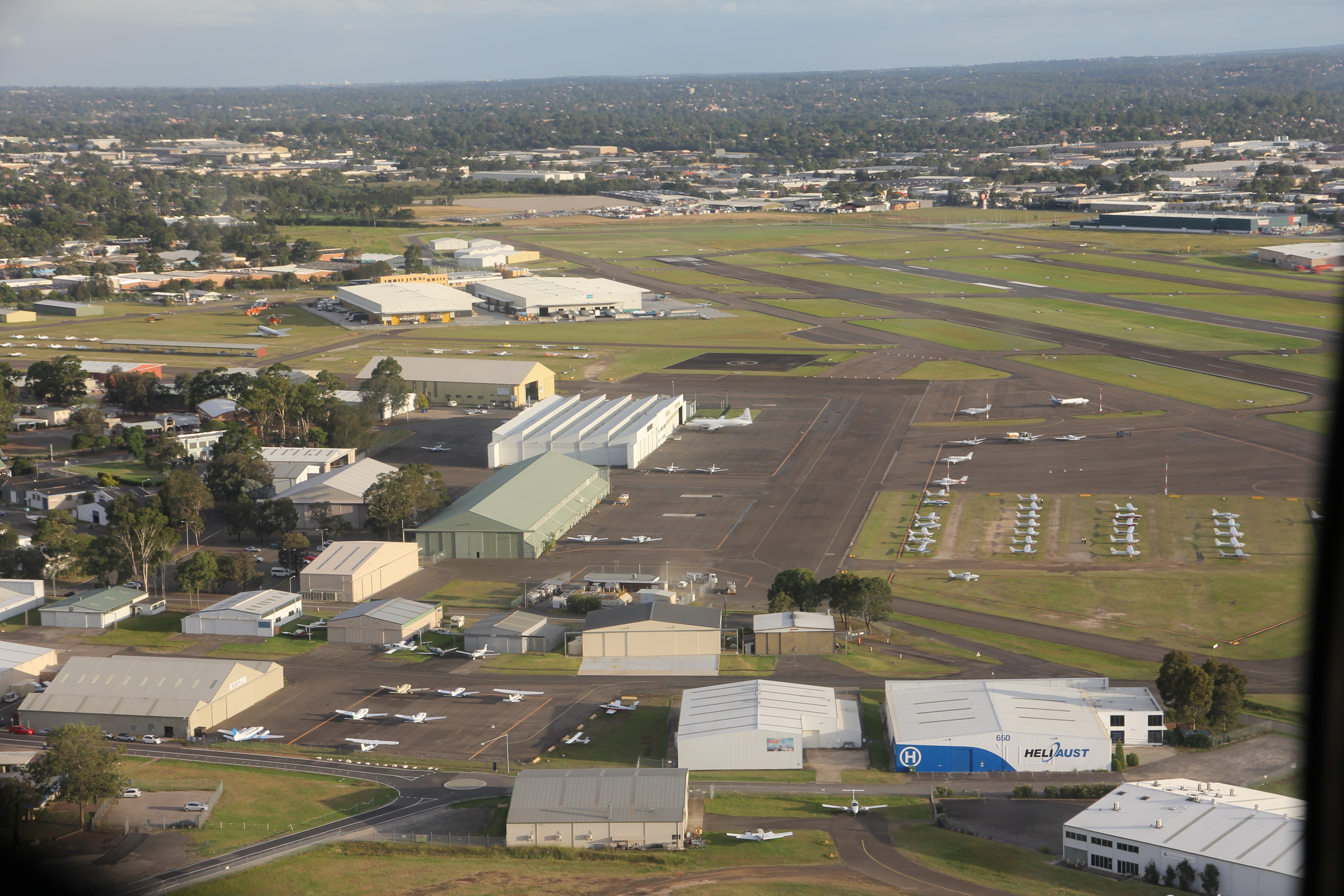
- IATA: BWU; ICAO: YSBK

Summary
- Airport type: Public
- Operator: Aeria Management Group
- Serves: Greater Western Sydney
- Location: Bankstown, New South Wales
- Built: 7 June 1940; 86 years ago
- Elevation AMSL: 34 ft (10 m)
- Coordinates: 33°55′30″S 150°59′18″E
- Website: aeria.co/bankstown

Map
- Location in Sydney

Runways
Direction	Length		Surface
Direction	m	ft	Surface
11C/29C	1,416	4,646	Asphalt
11R/29L	1,038	3,406	Asphalt
11L/29R	1,100	3,609	Asphalt

Statistics (2011)
- Aircraft movements: 243,126
- Sources: AIP and Movements at Australian Airports from Airservices Australia

Bankstown Airport (IATA: BWU, ICAO: YSBK) is an airport and business park located in the City of Canterbury-Bankstown, approximately 26 km (16 mi) from the Sydney central business district (CBD), Australia, and 17 km (11 mi) west of Sydney Airport. It is situated on 313 ha (770 acres) of land and has three parallel runways, several apron areas, a small passenger terminal and a business park, home to more than 160 businesses. The airport is home to numerous fixed-wing and helicopter flying schools and also caters to charter and private business flights, freight, aeromedical services, recreational flights, aircraft maintenance businesses, private aircraft and emergency services. Bankstown Airport operates 24 hours a day, with limitations placed on night circuit training.

The airport's air traffic control tower is listed on the Commonwealth Heritage List.

== History ==
=== World War II ===
Bankstown Airport was originally planned in 1929. The plan to build an airport at Bankstown was put on hold until it was established in 1940, after the commencement of World War II when the Department of Civil Aviation attained 630 acres (2.5 km^{2}) of land for development as a Royal Australian Air Force (RAAF) facility. The formal proclamation of the Bankstown airfield project occurred under the National Security Act on 7 June 1940. The urgency was such that work began immediately; the Act permitted construction to begin even before the land had been officially resumed by the government. On 2 December 1940, RAAF Headquarters was established at Bankstown, and on 19 December No 2 Aircraft Park moved to Bankstown where it remained until 28 March 1945. Its facilities were then taken over by the Royal Navy Fleet Air Arm.

During World War II, Bankstown Airport was used by the United States Army Air Forces, and was established as a key strategic air base to support the war effort in 1942. It became home to members of the 35th Pursuit Group and the 49th Pursuit Group from 1942 to 1944. In 1945 operations became the responsibility of the British Fleet Air Arm, known as Royal Naval Air Station Bankstown, HMS Nabberley, before being handed back to the RAAF on 31 July 1946.

Aircraft manufacturer de Havilland Australia (later Hawker de Havilland) built a new factory at Bankstown Airport during the war and commenced manufacturing de Havilland Mosquito combat aircraft there in 1942.

==== Units based at Bankstown during World War II ====
- No. 2 Aircraft Park RAAF
- No. 451 Squadron RAAF
- 4th Fighter Squadron of 35th Pursuit Group
- 39th Fighter Squadron of 35th Pursuit Group
- 41st Fighter Squadron of 35th Pursuit Group
- 7th Fighter Squadron of 49th Pursuit
- Royal Naval Air Station Bankstown, HMS Nabberley

=== Post War ===
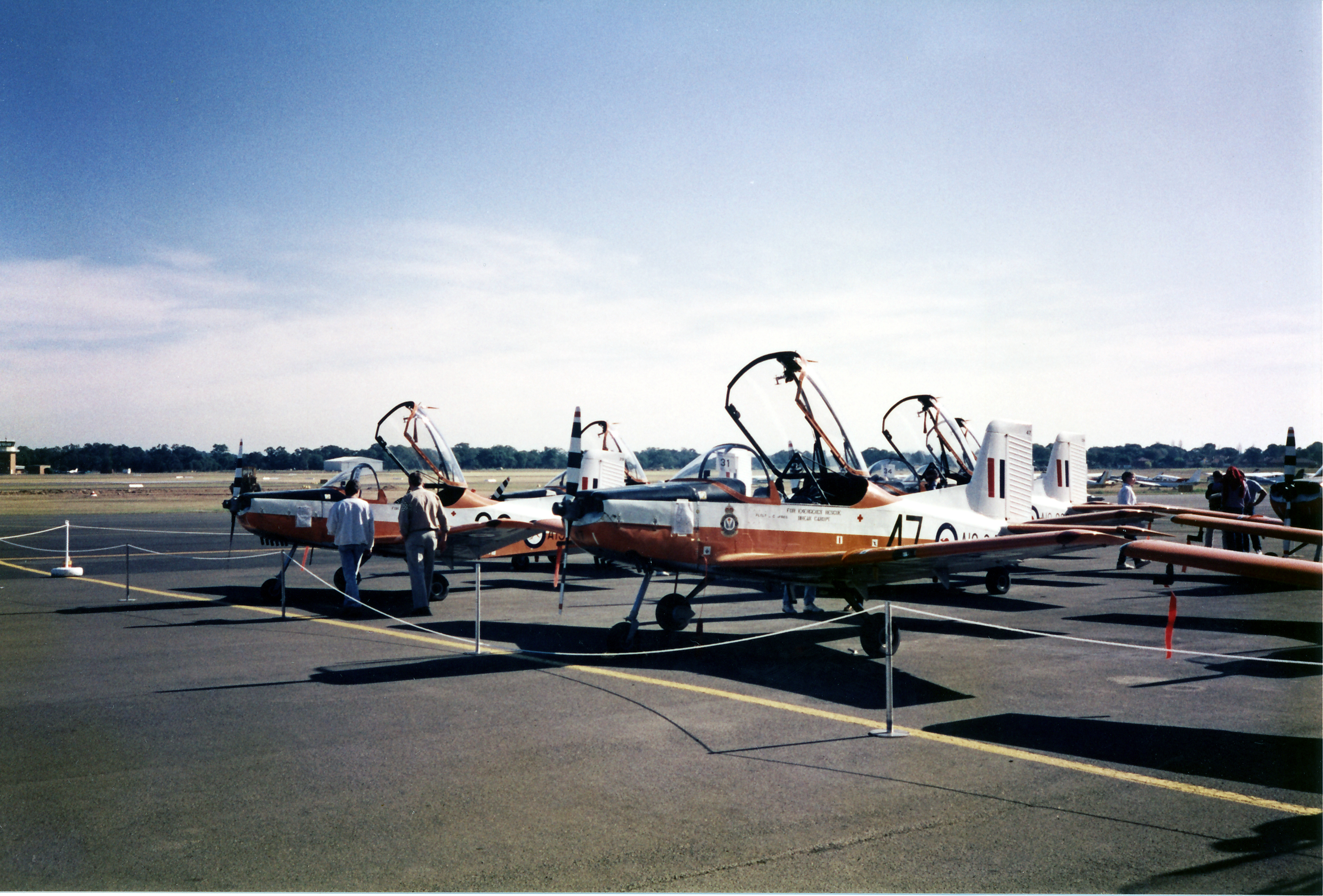
RAAF CT4 trainers lined up on the tarmac at Bankstown awaiting the Pickles auction start. 36 of these aircraft went under the hammer in Sydney in 1993 following the closure of the No 1 Flying Training School at Point Cook in Victoria.

In 1970, the government put forth a proposal to expand the airport's operations, but this was vigorously opposed by the local community.

In September 1982, a Socata TB10 Tobago light aircraft was stolen by 26-year-old student pilot Philip Henryk Wozniak, who committed suicide by intentionally crashing on the airport, also destroying a parked Douglas DC-3 and Piaggio P.166 in the process. In October the following year, Philip Wozniak's twin brother, Richard Wozniak, also attempted to commit suicide by stealing a plane from Bankstown Airport, but crashed while attempting to takeoff. He survived and was charged with several offences, pleading not guilty.

Today, Bankstown Airport is Sydney's primary general aviation airport, and also serves charter and cargo flights for various companies and carriers.

The airport's master plan was approved in March 2005 by the Minister for Transport and Regional Services. The plan governs the airport's operations until 2024–25. The current approved Airport Environment Strategy was published in 2014 and is valid until 2019.

== Facilities ==
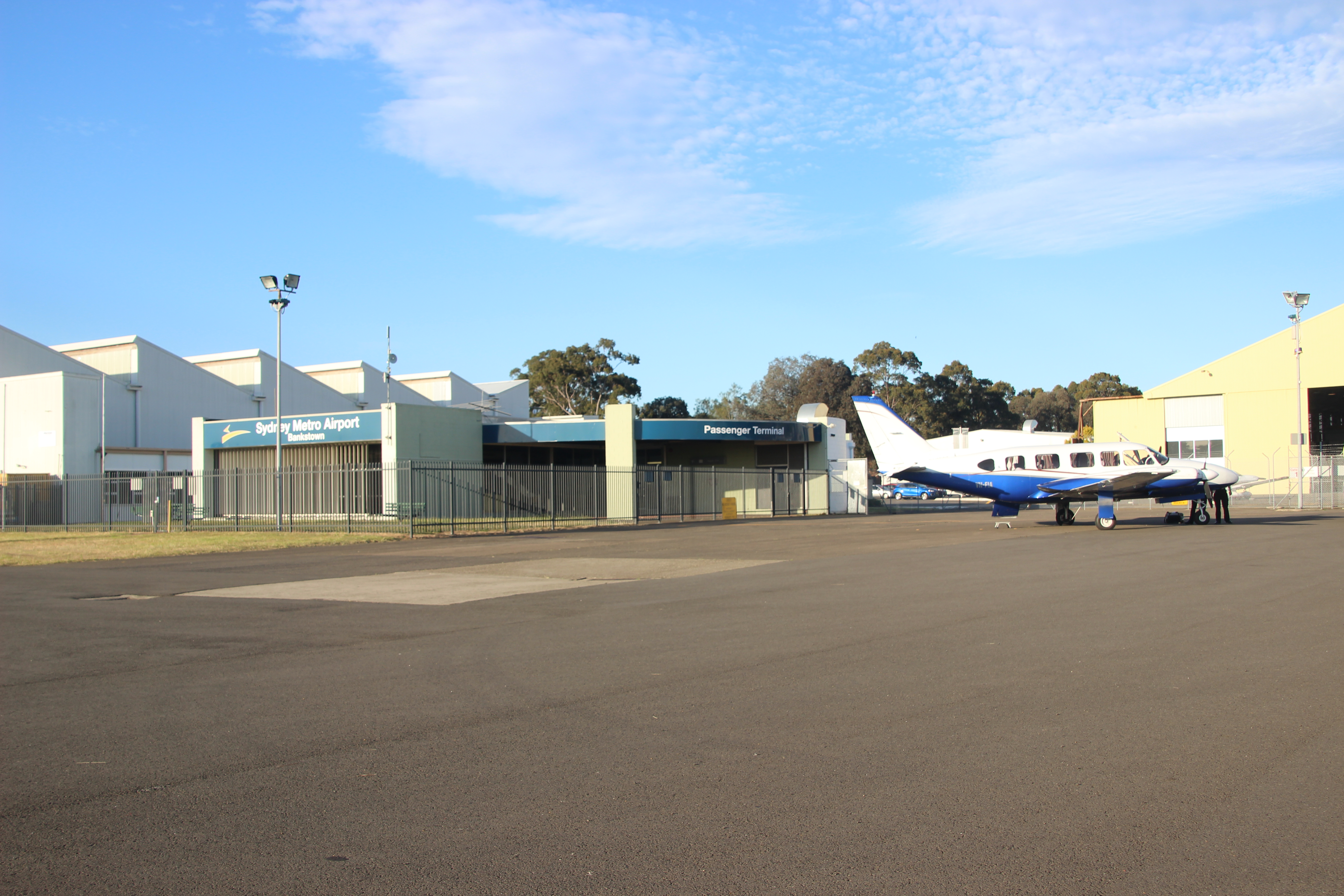
Bankstown Airport's passenger terminal with a Piper Chieftain on the right, October 2016

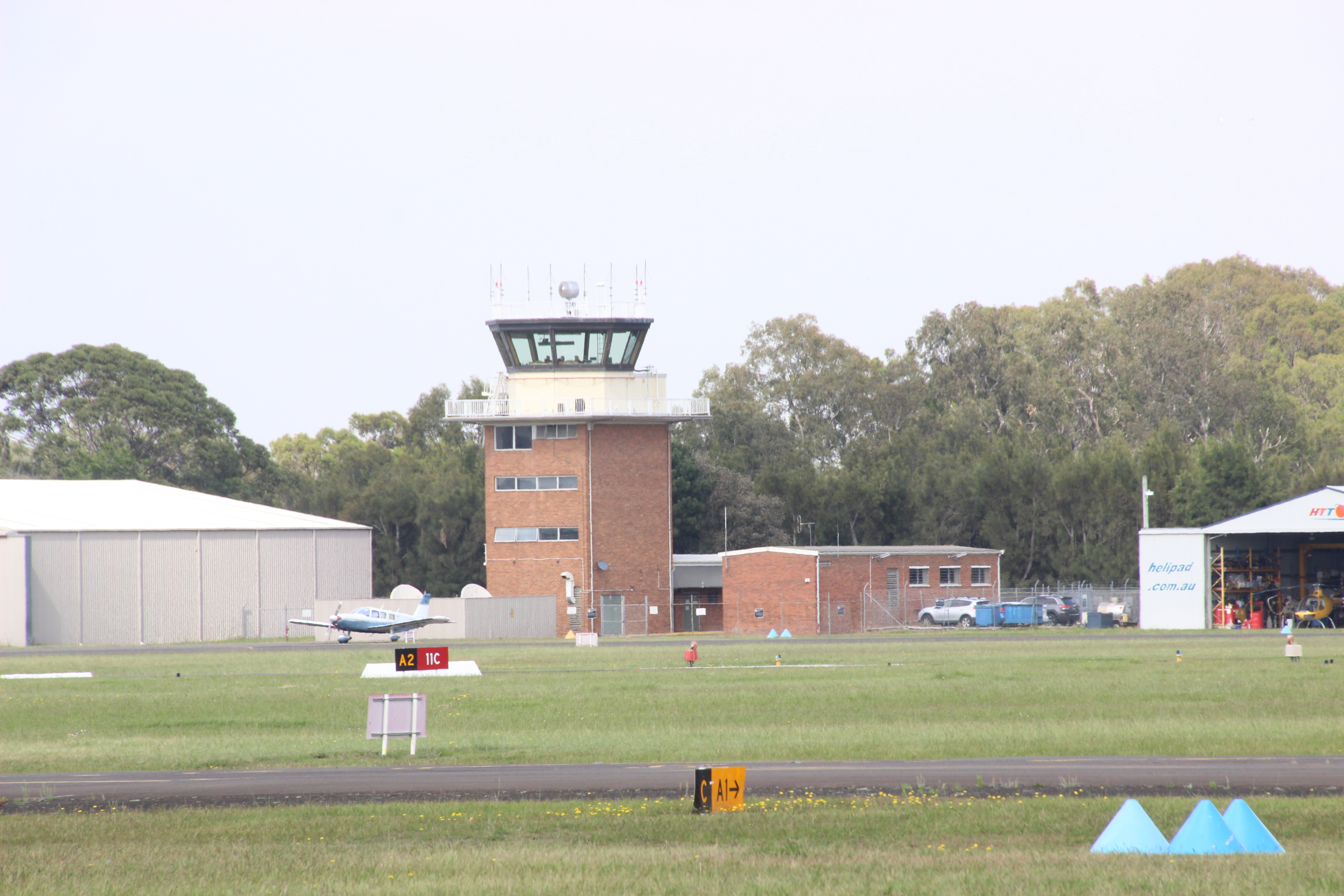
The airport's control tower

The airport has three parallel runways. The primary runway (11C/29C) is 1,416 m × 30 m (4,646 ft × 98 ft). Bankstown has its own dedicated air traffic control tower, operated by Airservices Australia, and uses Class D airspace procedures.

=== Passenger facilities ===
The existing small passenger terminal at the airport is capable of handling up to 200 passengers per hour. Vehicle parking is available at no charge. Arriving passengers can arrange for taxi pick up at the terminal. The main airport entrance is also serviced by a local bus service to Bankstown railway station.

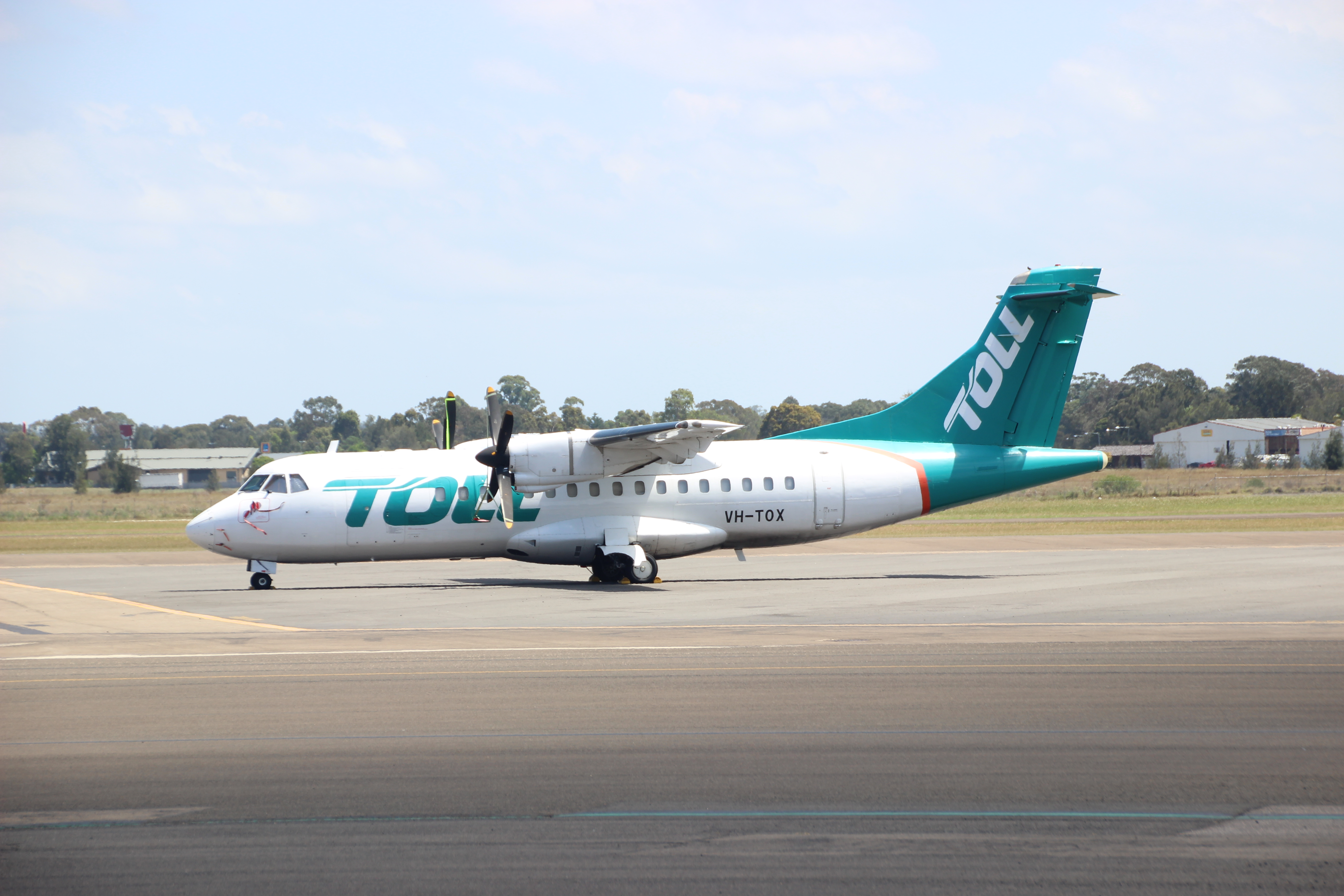
Toll Aviation ATR 42 cargo aircraft at Bankstown Airport, November 2016

== Other operators ==
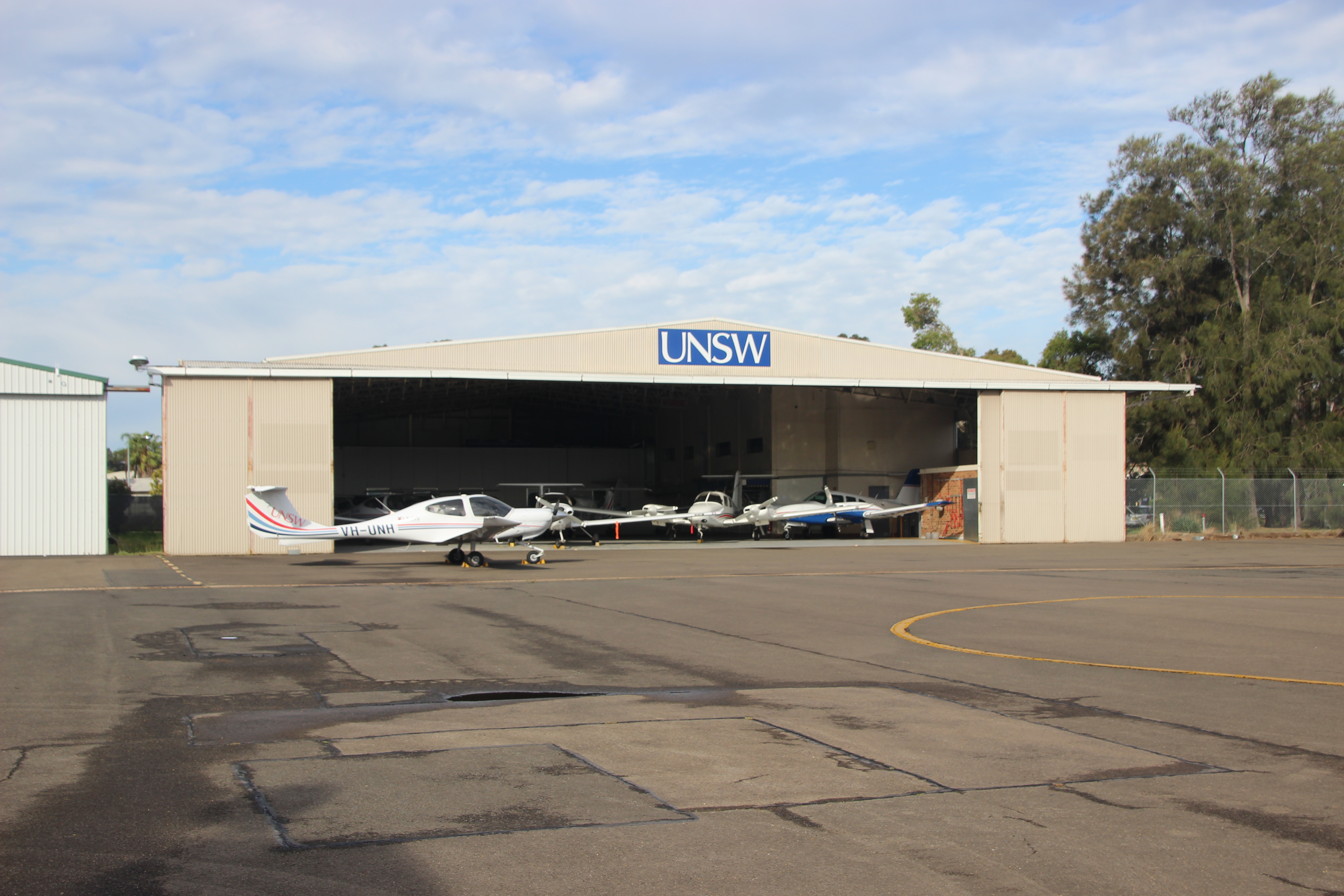
Hangar of the UNSW Faculty of Science School of Aviation with some of the school's training aircraft, October 2016

The following organisations have operating bases at Bankstown Airport:

- ASL Airlines Australia (formerly Pionair)
- New South Wales Ambulance
- New South Wales Police Aviation Support Branch
- Royal Flying Doctor Service

The Australian Aviation Museum was located at Bankstown Airport when the museum opened in February 1994. It closed at Bankstown in 2016 and was intended to be reopened at the less busy Camden airport in 2017, but this public relocation did not take place. The collection remains in storage in Camden under the control of the family of the now deceased original private collector, with access restricted to aviation restoration experts.

== In popular culture ==
One of the hangars at Bankstown was used for the filming of Top Gear Australia; however, none of the track sections were filmed at Bankstown as it is too busy. They were predominantly filmed at Camden Airport which is far quieter. The apron area was used as a location for the short film Come Fly with Me in 2009.

== See also ==
- List of airports in Greater Sydney
- List of airports in New South Wales
- Transport in Australia
- United States Army Air Forces in Australia (World War II)
