= 804 Naval Air Squadron =

Inactive flying squadron of the Royal Navy's Fleet Air Arm

- Squadron badge
- Active: 1939–1944; 1944–1945; 1946–1955; 1956–1959; 1960–1961
- Disbanded: 15 September 1961
- Country: United Kingdom
- Branch: Royal Navy
- Type: Single-seat fighter squadron
- Role: Carrier-based fighter squadron
- Part of: Fleet Air Arm
- Motto: Swift to Kill
- Aircraft: See Aircraft flown section for full list.
- Engagements: World War II; Korean War; Suez Crisis
- Battle honours: Norway 1940; Atlantic 1941; North Africa 1942; Normandy 1944; East Indies 1945; Burma 1945; Korea 1951-52

Commanders
- Notable commanders: Lieutenant Commander(A) Stanley Orr, DSC & Bar, RNVR; Lieutenant Commander Eric Brown, OBE, DSC, AFC, RN

Insignia
- Squadron Badge Description: Blue, a tiger's head inclined to profile proper holding in the jaws a sword fesswise silver pommel and hilt gold (1944)
- Identification Markings: S7A+ (Martlet); single letters (Fulmar); S7A+ (Sea Hurricane); single letters (Hellcat August 1943-February 1944); 1A+ and 2A+ (Hellcat from September 1944); to 6A+ (Hellcat February 1945); then K6A+, O8A + (Hellcat by September 1945); 130-142 (Seafire); 100-121 (Sea Fury); to 150-159 (Sea Fury July 1952); 186-199 (Sea Hawk December 1954); 160-171 (Sea Hawk February 1956); 161-166 (Scimitar)
- Fin Carrier Codes: O:T (Seafire); R (Sea Fury); to T (Sea Fury July 1952); J (Sea Hawk December 1954); O:B:R:A (Sea Hawk February 1956); H (Scimitar)

804 Naval Air Squadron (804 NAS), also referred to as 804 Squadron, is an inactive Fleet Air Arm (FAA) naval air squadron of the United Kingdom's Royal Navy (RN). It most recently operated the Supermarine Scimitar F.1 jet fighter aircraft between March 1960 and September 1961, embarked in HMS Hermes and with a shore base at RNAS Lossiemouth, Moray.

It formed in November 1939 from part of 769 Naval Air Squadrons Gloster Sea Gladiators which had been detached to RNAS Hatston. It served throughout the Second World War with a further variety of fighter aircraft including Brewster Buffalo, Grumman Martlet, Hawker Sea Hurricane, Fairey Fulmar and Grumman Hellcat. The squadron was merged into 800 Naval Air Squadron in June 1944 and subsequently reformed in September, when it flew Supermarine Seafire. During the Korean War, it flew Hawker Sea Fury and these were followed by the Hawker Sea Hawk during the Suez Crises.

== History ==
=== Second World War (1939-1945) ===
During World War II, the squadron was equipped with various aircraft types in differing roles. When formed, on 30 November 1939, at HMS Sparrowhawk, the Royal Naval Air Station near Kirkwall, on Mainland, Orkney, 804 used four Gloster Sea Gladiators in defence of the naval base at Scapa Flow, the aircraft were previously part of 769 Naval Air Squadron.

It transferred, in April 1940, to HMS Glorious to provide air cover for the ferrying of the Royal Air Force's 263 Squadron's Gloster Gladiators to Norway, after the German invasion. This was a brief assignment and in early May the squadron was transferred to HMS Furious via the Royal Naval Air Station at Campbeltown, thus missing HMS Glorious's sinking. Between May and September 1940, 804 Squadron returned to RNAS Hatston, and was subsequently recognised as one of the two FAA squadrons that operated with RAF Fighter Command in the Battle of Britain.

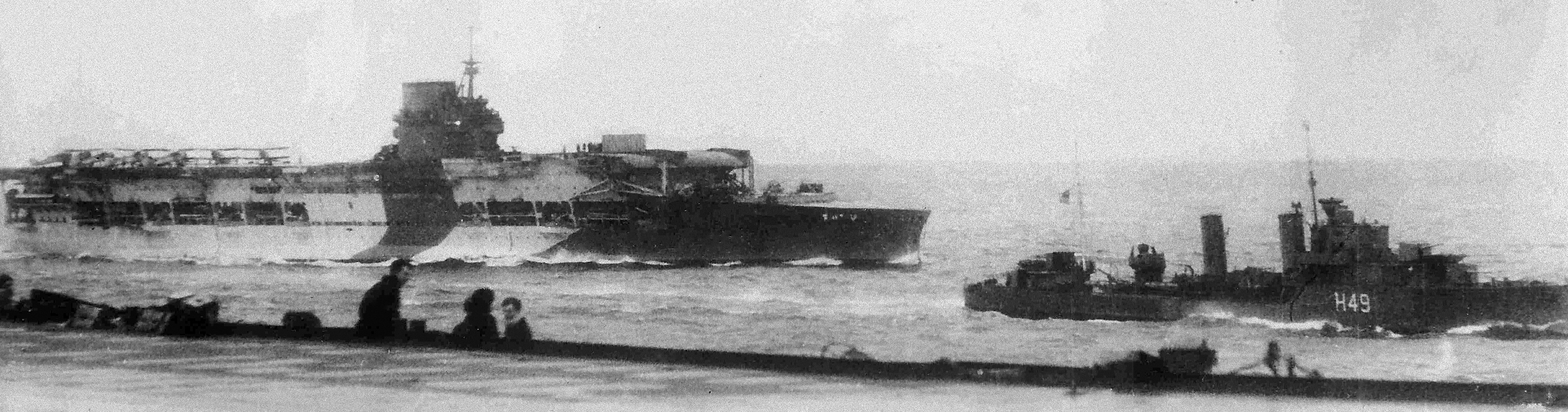
The last picture of Glorious before her final battle, escorted by Diana

In October 1940, 804 Squadron re-equipped with Grumman Martlet Mk I, an American carrier-borne fighter aircraft, and first operated the new fighters out of RNAS Skaebrae in the Orkney Islands in October 1940. On 25 December 1940, two of the squadron's Grumman Martlets shot down a Junkers Ju 88 off Scapa Flow, thus scoring the first aerial victory in Europe by any variant of the Grumman F4F Wildcat. Further re-equipping occurred in February 1941 at RNAS Yeovilton (HMS Heron), Somerset, with Fairey Fulmar Mk II, a British carrier-borne fighter and reconnaissance aircraft and Hawker Sea Hurricane, a navalised version of the Hawker Hurricane fighter aircraft.

In April 1941 the squadron was assigned to operate from catapult-armed ships (CAM ships and fighter catapult ships) until this role was taken over by the RAF's Merchant Ship Fighter Unit in May 1942. During this assignment, the squadron had aircraft on HMS Ariguani, HMS Springbank (until sunk on 27 September 1940), HMS Maplin, and SS Michael (until sunk on 2 June 1941). In August 1941, an 804 Squadron Hawker Sea Hurricane from HMS Maplin, piloted by Robert Everett, shot down an Focke-Wulf Fw 200 Condor, the first such victory for a catapult launched aircraft.

In July 1942, the squadron escorted Gibraltar convoys on board the light aircraft carrier HMS Argus and later, in October, now equipped with Hawker Sea Hurricane Mk.IIc, joined the Avenger-class escort carrier HMS Dasher for the Operation Torch, the North African landings. The squadron was re-equipped yet again in August 1943 with Grumman Hellcat F. Mk. I, an American fighter aircraft and in October formed part of the 7th Naval Fighter Wing. Two months later they embarked on the Ruler-class escort carrier HMS Emperor and accompanied a US-bound convoy.

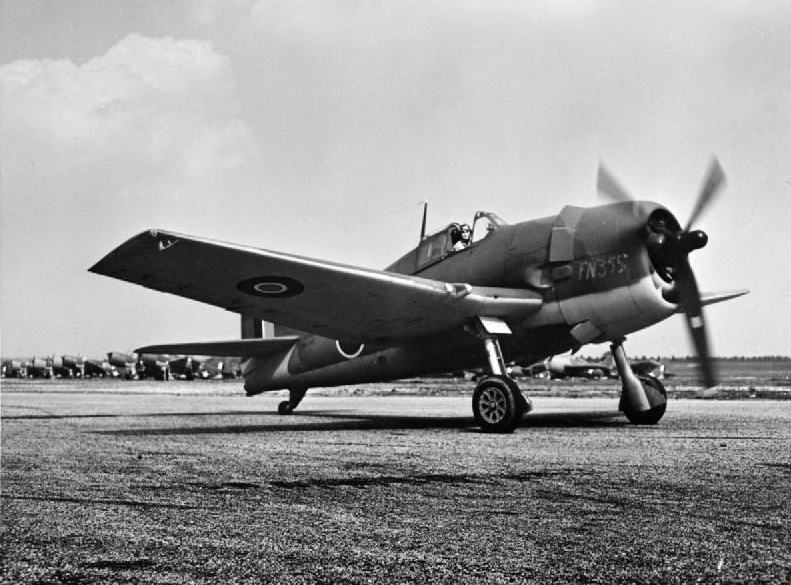
A Fleet Air Arm Hellcat F. Mk. I

The squadron took part in the successful assault on 3 April 1944, against the German battleship Tirpitz as part of Operation Tungsten in Altafjord, located in northern Norway. The Fleet Air Arm's Fairey Barracuda dive-bombers launched from HMS Furious and HMS Victorious received support from the 7th Naval Fighter Wing, which included 804. However, in June 1944, 804 was absorbed into 800 Squadron.

804 Squadron reformed in September 1944 at RNAS Wingfield (HMS Malagas), Cape Town, South Africa with twenty-four Grumman Hellcat F. Mk. II and in December, they embarked on HMS Ameer to provide cover during the landings on Ramree Island, and subsequently missions over Sumatra and Malaya. In April 1945 the squadron embarked on HMS Empress and also HMS Shah for attacks on the Andaman Islands and the coast of Burma, returning to HMS Ameer in June for attacks on Sumatran airfields and Phuket Island, only returning to the United Kingdom after V-J Day in November 1945.

=== Seafire (1946-1949) ===
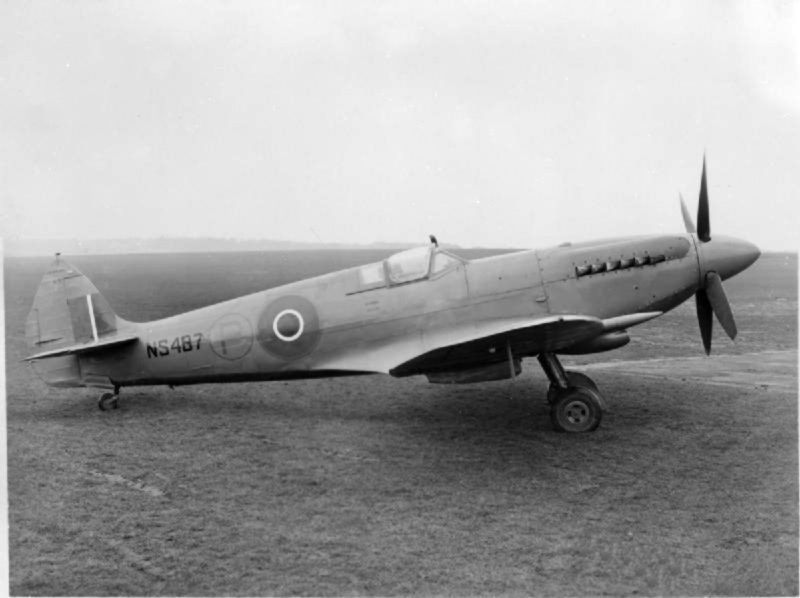
Prototype Seafire F Mk.XV

On 1 October 1946, 804 Squadron was re-established with twelve Supermarine Seafire F Mk.XV fighter aircraft at RNAS Eglinton (HMS Gannet), located in County Londonderry, as a component of the 14th Carrier Air Group. Following their preparation, the squadron boarded the Colossus class light fleet carrier HMS Theseus in February 1947 for a cruise in the Far East, which included stops in both New Zealand and Australia.

The Seafire F Mk.XV represented the inaugural variant powered by the Rolls-Royce Griffon engine. In addition to utilising the Griffon Mk VI, it also distinguished itself from previous Seafire models by featuring an enhanced fuel capacity and a single-type arrestor hook. The ultimate iteration of the Seafire to be deployed was the Mk.47, which served as the naval variant of the Spitfire F Mk 24. This model was completely adapted for naval operations, featuring folding wings that folded upwards just outside the wheel wells. All Seafire Mk.47s were equipped with a six-bladed contra-rotating propeller, a bubble canopy, and a tail assembly reminiscent of the Spiteful and entered first-line service in the FAA with 804 Squadron at RNAS Ford (HMS Peregrine), West Sussex.

In January 1948, the squadron was re-equipped with thirteen Supermarine Seafire FR Mk.47s, which subsequently embarked on the Colossus-class light fleet carrier HMS Ocean in August for deployment in the Mediterranean.

=== Sea Fury (1949-1954) ===
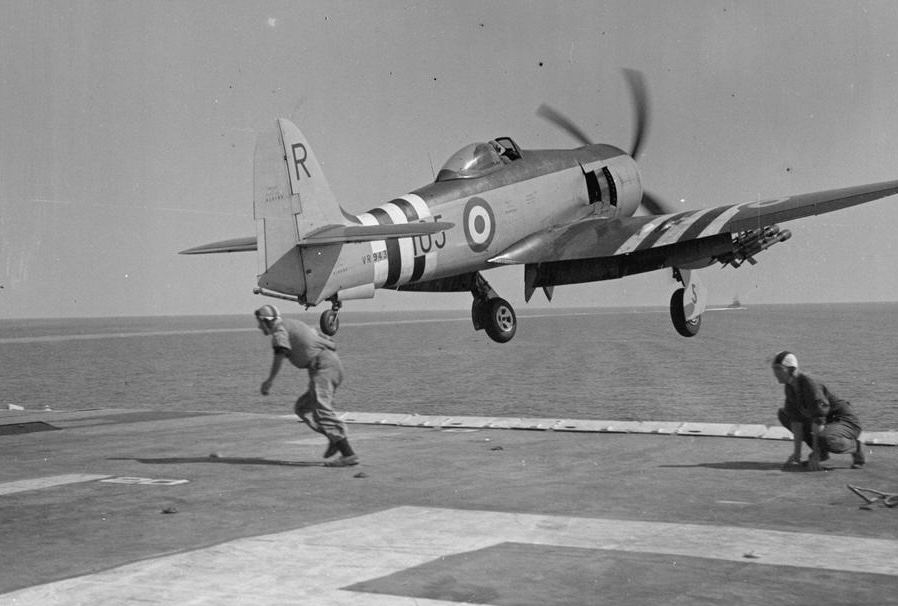
A Sea Fury FB.11 of 804 Squadron catapulted from Glory, during the Korean war

The Hawker Sea Fury represented the final piston-engine fighter utilised by the Fleet Air Arm in front-line squadrons, operating from 1947 to 1955. It was notable for being the first British naval aircraft to feature power-folding wings in regular service. The Sea Fury commenced its operational service in the late summer of 1947.

In July 1949, 804 Squadron was re-equipped with thirteen Hawker Sea Fury FB.11s, which subsequently joined the Colossus-class light fleet carrier HMS Glory in December. They remained in the Mediterranean until they were deployed to operate in Korean waters from April to October 1951, with an expanded complement of twenty-one aircraft. Following a withdrawal to Singapore for the acquisition of new aircraft, a duration was spent in Australia, after which the ship proceeded north for additional operations in Korea from February to April 1952. Upon returning to the Mediterranean, the squadron was transferred to a sister ship HMS Theseus in Malta, subsequently disembarking at RNAS Lee-on-Solent HMS (Daedalus), Hampshire. Periods were later spent aboard both HMS Theseus and the Illustrious class fleet carrier HMS Indomitable.

=== Sea Hawk (1953-1959) ===
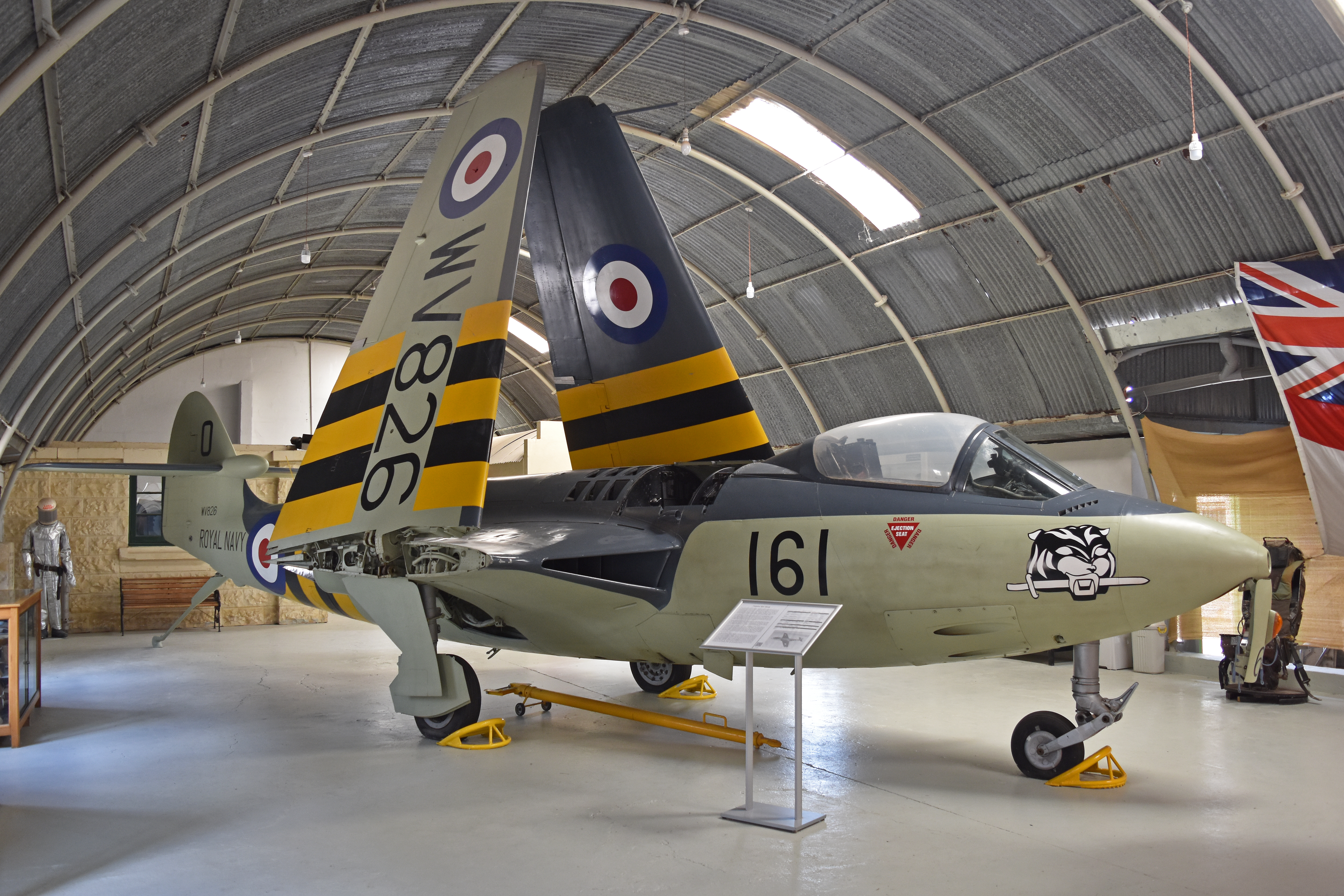
Sea Hawk FGA.6 ‘WV826 - O-161’, 804 Squadron

In November 1953, 804 Naval Air Squadron transitioned to twelve Sea Hawk F.1 jet fighters at RNAS Lossiemouth (HMS Fulmar), located in Moray. The Hawker Sea Hawk was first introduced to the FAA squadron in 1953, replacing the Supermarine Attacker jet and the Hawker Sea Fury piston-engine fighters. These were substituted in December 1954 with the FGA.4, which was the first variant designed for fighter and ground attack purposes. In May 1955, the squadron embarked on a Mediterranean cruise aboard the Audacious-class aircraft carrier HMS Eagle, which was succeeded by a Norwegian exercise in October. Subsequently, on 17 November, the squadron was disbanded upon its arrival at HMNB Devonport.

In February 1956, 804 Squadron was reformed with eleven Sea Hawk FGA.6 aircraft, which it embarked upon in HMS Bulwark in June. Following a brief period in Home Waters, the vessel proceeded to the Mediterranean, where its squadrons engaged in the Suez operations in November, conducting attacks on Egyptian airfields and providing support for ground forces. Subsequently, the aircraft were returned to the UK, where they embarked in the Audacious-class aircraft carrier HMS Ark Royal in February 1957. After transferring to HMS Albion in July 1958, the ship set sail for the Far East three months later, including visits to Australia in February 1959. In May, the ship returned home, and 804 Squadron was disbanded at RNAS Brawdy (HMS Goldcrest), Pembrokeshire, on 30 September.

=== Scimitar (1960-1961) ===
Upon the squadron's subsequent reformation at RNAS Lossiemouth, in March 1960, it was equipped with six Scimitar F.1s, under the command Lieutenant Commander T. Binney, RN. The Supermarine Scimitar was the first swept-wing, single-seat fighter introduced by the FAA, signifying a major milestone as the initial aircraft in the FAA to reach supersonic speeds. Furthermore, it was the first aircraft utilised by the FAA that had the ability to transport an atomic bomb.

The squadron embarked in the Centaur class light fleet carrier HMS Hermes, in July, subsequent to a rigorous phase of preparation. In July and August, the carrier was in the Mediterranean before making its return journey and reaching Rosyth in early September. The carrier set sail again in the middle of the month to engage in a NATO exercise off the Norwegian coast. Upon returning home, 804 squadron remained a shore until 28 November, when they flew to RAF North Front in Gibraltar to reunite with HMS Hermes. Following an exercise, the carrier navigated through Suez to Aden and 804 spent Christmas Day in Ceylon. The next day, HMS Hermes resumed its voyage, arriving in Singapore on New Year’s Eve.

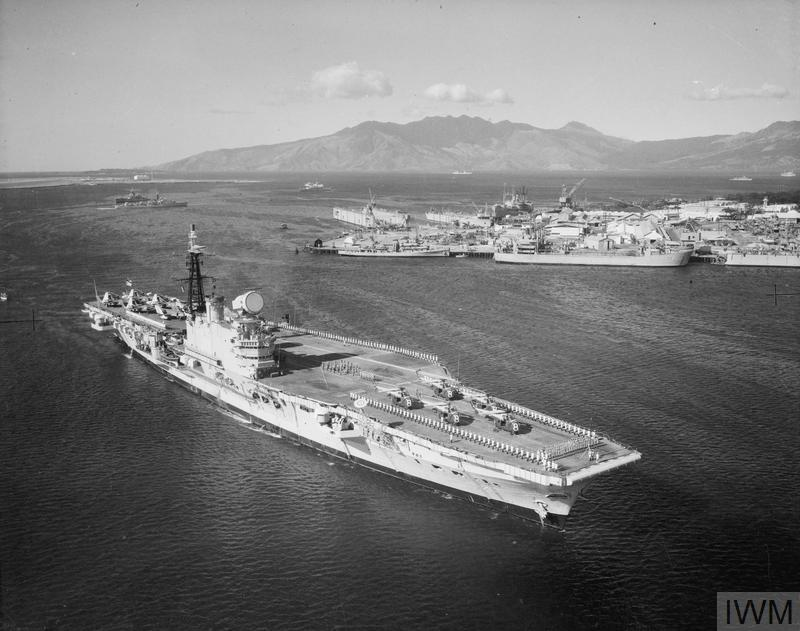
Hermes at Subic Bay, Philippines, 18 January 1961.

The winter of 1960-61 was dedicated to operations in the Far East. During January the carrier visited Subic Bay in the Philippines, then Hong Kong and arrived back at Singapore for maintenance in early February. Heading back to the UK, on the way, the it participated in an exercise before arriving at Aden and then Malta and back to the UK mid April April, where the squadron flew off and headed back to RNAS Lossiemouth.

804 re-joined HMS Hermes once more at the end of May for training exercises in the English Channel, where the squadron accomplished its 1,000th carrier landing. After departing again for exercises mid June, the carrier returned to Portsmouth by 22 and was en route to NAS Norfolk, Virginia, USA on 30 when developments in the Middle East necessitated her orders to Gibraltar. Upon reaching the Rock on, it was determined that the situation in Kuwait did not require the presence of HMS Hermes.

The squadron disembarked from the carrier on 10 September for a non-stop flight to RNAS Lossiemouth, where the squadron disbanded on 15 September 1961.

== Aircraft flown ==
The squadron has flown a number of different aircraft types, including:

- Gloster Sea Gladiator biplane fighter aircraft (November 1939 - January 1941)
- Brewster Buffalo fighter aircraft (July - September 1940, July 1941 - March 1942)
- Grumman Martlet Mk I fighter aircraft (September 1940 - March 1941)
- Miles Whitney Straight general aviation aircraft (December 1940 - March 1941)
- Hawker Sea Hurricane Mk lA fighter aircraft (February - September 1941)
- Hawker Sea Hurricane Mk IB fighter aircraft (February - September 1941)
- Fairey Fulmar Mk.I reconnaissance/fighter aircraft (February 1941 - May 1942)
- Fairey Fulmar Mk.II reconnaissance/fighter aircraft (February 1941 - May 1942)
- Hawker Hurricane Mk I fighter aircraft (September 1941 - July 1942)
- Hawker Sea Hurricane Mk IIB fighter aircraft (September 1941 - October 1942)
- Hawker Sea Hurricane Mk IlC fighter aircraft (October 1942 - June 1943)
- Grumman Hellcat F. Mk. I fighter aircraft (August 1943 - June 1944)
- Grumman Hellcat F. Mk. II fighter aircraft (September 1944 - October 1945)
- Supermarine Seafire F Mk.XV fighter aircraft (October 1946 - March 1948)
- Supermarine Seafire FR Mk.47 fighter aircraft (January 1948 - July 1949)
- Hawker Sea Fury FB.11 fighter bomber (July 1949 - January 1954)
- Hawker Sea Hawk F1 jet fighter aircraft (November 1953 - January 1955)
- Hawker Sea Hawk FGA 4 fighter/ground attack aircraft (December 1954 - November 1955)
- Hawker Sea Hawk FGA 6 fighter/ground attack aircraft (February 1956 - September 1959)
- Supermarine Scimitar F.1 jet fighter aircraft (March 1960 - September 1961)

== Battle honours ==
The battle honours awarded to 804 Naval Air Squadron are:

- Norway 1940-44
- Atlantic 1941
- North Africa 1942
- Normandy 1944
- East Indies 1945
- Burma 1945
- Korea 1951-52

== Assignments ==
804 Naval Air Squadron was assigned as needed to form part of a number of larger units:

- 7th Naval Fighter Wing (October 1943 - June 1944)
- 14th Carrier Air Group (October 1946 - December 1947)

== Commanding officers ==
List of commanding officers of 804 Naval Air Squadron:

1939 - 1944

- Captain R.T. Partridge, RM, from 30 November 1939
- Lieutenant Commander J.C. Cockburn, RN, from 11 December 1939
- Lieutenant Commander B.H.M. Kendall, RN, from 18 November 1940
- Lieutenant Commander P.H. Havers, RN, from 5 March 1941
- Captain A.E. Marsh, RM, from 9 February 1942
- Lieutenant Commander(A) A.J. Sewell, DSC, RNVR, from 18 October 1942
- Lieutenant O.R. Oakes, RM (temp), from 13 July 1943
- Lieutenant Commander(A) J.W. Hedges, RNVR, from 29 July 1943
- Lieutenant Commander S.G. Orr, DSC & Bar, RNVR, from 10 August 1943
- disbanded - 15 June 1944

1944 - 1945

- Lieutenant Commander(A) G.B.C. Sangster, RNVR, from 1 September 1944
- Lieutenant Commander(A) D.B. Law, DSC, RNVR, from 20 May 1945
- disbanded - 18 November 1945

1946 - 1955

- Lieutenant Commander R.F. Bryant, RN, from 1 October 1946
- Lieutenant Commander S.F.F. Shotton, DSC, RN, from 11 June 1947
- Lieutenant Commander C.F. Hargreaves, RN, from 6 February 1949
- Lieutenant Commander J.S. Bailey, OBE, RN, from 1 December 1950
- Lieutenant Commander M.A. Birrell, RN, from 3 July 1952
- Lieutenant Commander J.R. Routley, RN, from 23 July 1952
- Lieutenant Commander E.M. Brown, OBE, DSC, AFC, RN, from 28 November 1953 (Commander 31 December 1953)
- Lieutenant Commander J.O. Rowbottom, RN, from 14 July 1954
- Lieutenant Commander D.R.O. Price, DFC, RN, from 13 September 1954
- disbanded - 17 November 1955

1956 - 1959

- Lieutenant Commander Rvon T.B. Kettle, RN, from 6 February 1956
- Lieutenant Commander G.B. Newby, AFC, RN, from 5 April 1957
- Lieutenant Commander A.G.H. Perkins, RN, from 5 May 1958
- disbanded - 30 September 1959

1960 - 1961

- Lieutenant Commander T.V.G. Binney, RN, from 1 March 1960
- disbanded - 15 September 1961

Note: Abbreviation (A) signifies Air Branch of the RN or RNVR.

== See also ==
- Brian Young (Royal Navy officer) - Royal Navy Suez and Falklands veteran and former 804 Squadron pilot
- List of Battle of Britain squadrons
- Exercise Strikeback
