= 14th Carrier Air Group =

Royal Navy Fleet Air Arm Carrier Air Group

- White Ensign
- Active: 30 June 1945 - 23 July 1946; 1 October 1946 - 21 December 1947; 15 January 1948 - 2 May 1952
- Country: United Kingdom
- Branch: Royal Navy
- Type: Carrier Air Group
- Size: 1 x fighter squadron; 1 x TBR squadron
- Part of: Fleet Air Arm
- Formed for: Colossus-class aircraft carrier
- Engagements: World War II: Pacific War; Air raids on Japan; Korean War

The 14th Carrier Air Group (14th CAG) was a Fleet Air Arm (FAA) carrier air group of the Royal Navy (RN). It was last active between January 1948, operating in the Mediterranean and then seeing action in Korea, before disbanding a third time in May 1952.

It was initially formed in June 1945, for service in the British Pacific Fleet, until disbanding in July 1946. The group was for the name ship of her class HMS Colossus. The 14th CAG reformed in October 1946, at RNAS Eglinton (HMS Gannet), in Northern Ireland, for embarkation in HMS Theseus, until disbanding in December 1947.

== Naval Air Squadrons ==
14th Carrier Air Group consisted of a number of squadrons of the Fleet Air Arm.

Squadron	Aircraft	From	To
827 Naval Air Squadron	Fairey Barracuda Mk.II	June 1945	July 1946
1846 Naval Air Squadron	Vought Corsair Mk IV	June 1945	July 1946
804 Naval Air Squadron	Supermarine Seafire F MK.XV	October 1946	December 1947
812 Naval Air Squadron	Fairey Firefly FR.I	October 1946	December 1947
804 Naval Air Squadron	Supermarine Seafire FR Mk.47 to July 1949, then Hawker Sea Fury FB.11	January 1948	May 1952
812 Naval Air Squadron	Fairey Firefly FR.I, NF.Mk I, FR.Mk 4, FR.Mk 5, AS.Mk 6	January 1948	May 1952

== History ==
The squadrons of the Fleet Air Arm, stationed aboard the Royal Navy's Fleet and Light Fleet aircraft carriers for the British Pacific Fleet, were restructured into Air Groups in accordance with the policies of the United States Navy after the end of World War II in Europe. This reorganisation was intended to enhance operational effectiveness in the Pacific Theater against Japanese forces in 1945. The initial four Colossus-class aircraft carriers were designed to host Carrier Air Groups numbered from thirteen to eighteen. Each of these groups was to comprise a squadron of twenty-one Vought Corsair aircraft alongside a squadron of twelve Fairey Barracuda planes.

=== 1945-1946 ===
The 14th Carrier Air Group was established on 30 June 1945, and was stationed aboard the light aircraft carrier, HMS Colossus, the lead ship of her class, for deployment within the British Pacific Fleet. Initially, the group comprised 827 Naval Air Squadron, which operated Fairey Barracuda, a British torpedo and dive bomber designed for carrier operations, and 1846 Naval Air Squadron, which flew Vought Corsair, an American fighter aircraft.

On 21 July, 1846 Squadron disembarked to HMS Nabbington in New South Wales, while HMS Nabswick received 827 Squadron before the carrier entered Sydney Harbour. The squadrons remained on land until 13 August, when they re-embarked in HMS Colossus, which was preparing to depart for Manus in the Admiralty Islands. By 10 August, it became evident that Japan was inclined to accept the terms of surrender, prompting the reallocation of all ships in Australian waters to form Task Group 111, which was poised to reoccupy the former Crown Colonies in Hong Kong.

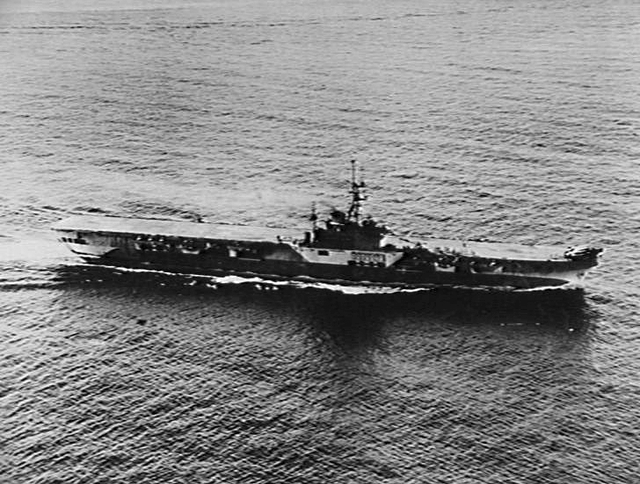
HMS Colossus, circa September 1945. Two Fairey Barracuda torpedo bombers from 827 Naval Air Squadron are parked at the forward end of the flight deck.

Upon their arrival in Hong Kong on 12 October, both 1846 and 827 Squadrons deployed detachments of aircraft to operate from HMS Nabcatcher, also referred to as RNAS Kai Tak. These aircraft were re-embarked on 18 October when the carrier set sail to return to Ceylon.

On 26 October, HMS Colossus transferred her entire Air Group to RNAS Katukurunda (HMS Ukussa), located in Ceylon. The carrier was designated for a trooping mission, necessitating the clearance of the hangar deck and air group accommodations to maximise space. Following its trooping duties, HMS Colossus was then scheduled for a refit at HM Dockyard in Simon's Town, set to commence in the New Year. The 14th Carrier Air Group re-embarked on 30 December 1945, and the vessel departed for South Africa.

On 17 January, both squadrons disembarked at RNAS Wingfield (HMS Malagas), Cape Town, prior to the ship's entry into the Dockyard. It was determined that HMS Colossus would return to the UK after the refit and be placed in reserve, with the air group disbanding upon arrival. The 14th CAG re-embarked on April 8 as the ship prepared to sail for Ceylon, reaching its destination on the 27, where the air group disembarked at RNAS Katukurunda (HMS Ukussa). The final re-embarkation occurred on 17 May for the return journey to the UK. Upon arriving in The Solent in late July 1946, the squadrons disembarked, with 827 Squadron transferring to RNAS Lee-on-Solent (HMS Daedalus), Hampshire, on the 22 and 1846 Squadron to RNAS Gosport (HMS Siskin), Hampshire, on the 23, where they were subsequently disbanded.

=== 1946-1947 ===
The 14th Carrier Air Group reformed, on 1 October 1946 at RNAS Eglinton (HMS Gannet), located 1.3 miles (2.1 km) north east of Eglinton, County Londonderry, Northern Ireland, this time for the Colossus-class aircraft carrier, HMS Theseus, deployed as the Flagship, for the 1st Aircraft Carrier Squadron in the British Pacific Fleet, with 804 and 812 Naval Air Squadrons. 804 Naval Air Squadron operated the Supermarine Seafire, a naval version of the Supermarine Spitfire fighter aircraft, adapted for operation from an aircraft carrier. 812 Naval Air Squadron was equipped with Fairey Firefly, a carrier-borne fighter and anti-submarine aircraft. The group disbanded, when Theseus arrived back in the United Kingdom, on 21 December 1947.

=== 1948-1952 ===
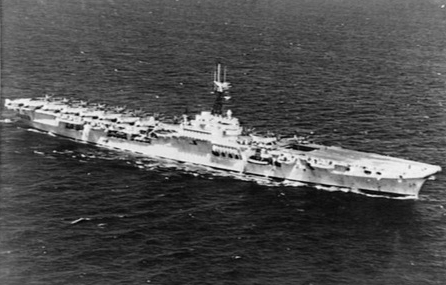
HMS Glory (R62) off Korea 1951, with 14th CAG onboard

The 14th Carrier Air Group reformed, on 15 January 1948, at RNAS Ford (HMS Peregrine), located at Ford, in West Sussex, England. The group was for the Colossus-class light fleet aircraft carrier, HMS Ocean (R68). It was made up of 802 and 814 Naval Air Squadrons again, the difference however, was that while both squadrons operated with the same aircraft, they now used later variants. The 14th CAG moved to RNAS Donibristle (HMS Merlin), located 2.7 miles (4.3 km) east of Rosyth, Fife, and RNAS Eglinton (HMS Gannet), located 1.3 miles (2.1 km) north east of Eglinton, County Londonderry, Northern Ireland, before emabarking on Ocean, on the 24 August 1948, then arriving at RNAS Hal Far (HMS Falcon), on Malta, on the 1 September 1948.

In July 1949, 804 NAS swapped its Supermarine Seafire aircraft for Hawker Sea Fury, a British Naval fighter-bomber aircraft, and 812 NAS received the FR.Mk 5 variant of the Fairey Firefly. Four Fairey Firefly NF.Mk I "night fighter" variant aircraft were also received, enabling the squadron to form Black Flight, which became known as the 14th CAG Night Fighter unit. In November 1949, the CAG transferred over to another Colossus-class aircraft carrier, HMS Glory (R62).

Aboard Glory, the CAG deployed to the Far East as the Korean War was now taking place. From April 1951 Glory and the 14th CAG, undertook a tour of nine, nine day patrols, off the West coast of North Korea. The aircraft carrier departed to Australia for a refit, but was back by February 1952, to undertake five more patrols, before returning home.

The 14th Carrier Air Group spent 316 days on patrols, during its time operating in the Korean War, amassing ~9,500 operational sorties. It disbanded, upon returning home to the United Kingdom, on the 2 May 1952.

=== Aircraft used ===
Aircraft used by the naval air squadrons that formed the 14th Carrier Air Group between 1945 and 1946, between 1945 and 1947, and from 1948 to 1952:

- Fairey Barracuda, a British torpedo and dive bomber
- Vought Corsair, an American fighter aircraft
- Supermarine Seafire, a navalised version of the Supermarine Spitfire for service on British aircraft carriers
- Fairey Firefly, a British carrier-borne fighter aircraft and anti-submarine aircraft
- Hawker Sea Fury, a British carrier-borne fighter-bomber

== Air Group Commanders ==
List of commanding officers of the 14th Carrier Air Group, with date of appointment:

1945 - 1946

- Not identified, from 30 June 1945
- disbanded - 23 July 1946

1946 - 1947

- Not identified, from 1 October 1946
- Lieutenant Commander G.R. Callingham, RN, from 1 January 1947
- disbanded - 21 December 1947

1948 - 1952

- Lieutenant Commander J.W. Sleigh, DSO, DSC, RN, from 27 January 1948
- Lieutenant Commander S.J. Hall, DSC, RN, from 24 October 1950
- Lieutenant Commander F.A. Swanton, DSC, RN, from 24 December 1951
- disbanded - 2 May 1952

== See also ==
- List of Fleet Air Arm groups
- List of aircraft carriers of the Royal Navy
- List of aircraft of the Fleet Air Arm
- List of Fleet Air Arm aircraft in World War II
