= 1846 Naval Air Squadron =

Inactive flying squadron of the Royal Navy's Fleet Air Arm

- Squadron badge
- Active: 1944–1946
- Disbanded: 23 July 1946
- Country: United Kingdom
- Branch: Royal Navy
- Type: Single-seat fighter squadron
- Role: Fighter squadron
- Size: Twenty four aircraft
- Part of: Fleet Air Arm
- Home station: See Naval air stations section for full list.
- Motto: To the swift the race

Insignia
- Squadron Badge Description: Blue, in base barry wavy of four white and blue a scimitar in pale winged white hilted gold (1946)
- Identification Markings: 1+V4; U5+, U6+ & U7+ (February 1945); 111-131 (July 1945)
- Fin Carrier Codes: D:C (July 1945)

Aircraft flown
- Fighter: Vought Corsair

1846 Naval Air Squadron (1846 NAS) was a Fleet Air Arm (FAA) naval air squadron of the United Kingdom's Royal Navy (RN). It formed at RN Air Section Brunswick in July 1944 as a fighter squadron, with eighteen Vought Corsair Mk III fighter aircraft. It embarked in HMS Ranee in October, disembarking to HMS Gannet, RNAS Eglinton at the beginning of November, where it expanded to twenty-four aircraft by absorbing part of the disbanded 1848 Naval Air Squadron. In February 1945, it re-equipped with Vought Corsair Mk IV, having joined HMS Colossus at the start of the year. The aircraft carrier departed for the Far East in February, and its aircraft formed part of the 14th Carrier Air Group when this formed in June at HMS Valluru, Royal Naval Aircraft Maintenance Yard Tambaram. The squadron was too late for World War II, and eventually disbanded at HMS Siskin, RNAS Gosport, in July 1946.

== History ==
=== Single-seat fighter squadron (1944 - 1946) ===
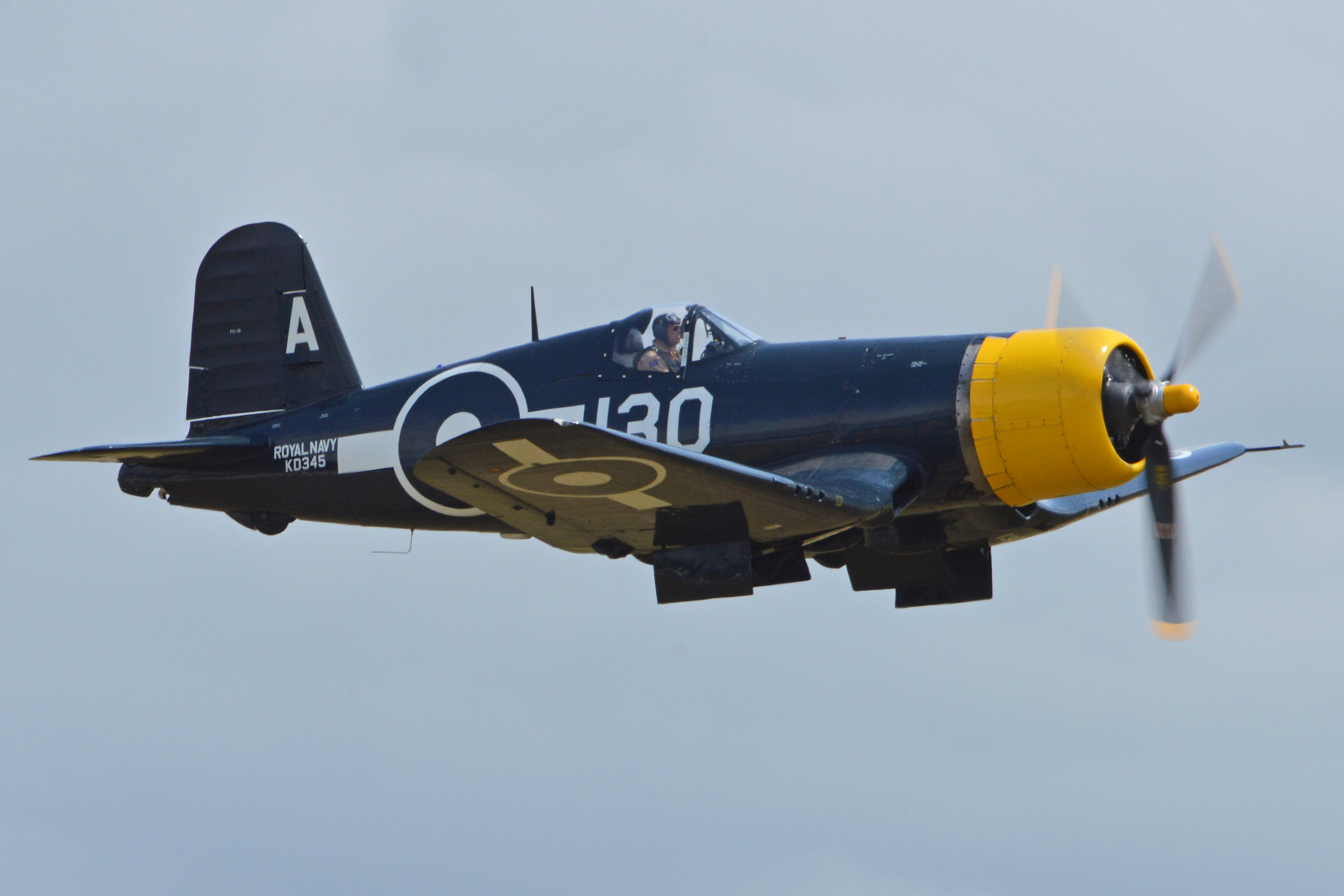
A Fleet Air Arm Goodyear FG-1D Corsair

1846 Naval Air Squadron formed on 1 July 1944 in the United States at RN Air Section Brunswick, which was located at United States Naval Air Station (USNAS) Brunswick, Maine, as a Single Seat Fighter Squadron, under the command of Lieutenant Commander(A) D.G. Brooker, RNVR.

It was equipped with eighteen Vought Corsair aircraft, an American carrier-borne fighter-bomber. These were the Brewster built F3A-1 and F3A-1D variant, designated Corsair Mk III by the Fleet Air Arm. Training consisted air combat, low altitude and formation flying and navigation. On 9 August the squadron began Aerodrome Dummy Deck Landings (ADDLs) utilising the nearby US Naval Auxiliary Airfield at Bar Harbor, Maine. The squadron briefly flew to RN Air Section Norfolk, located at USNAS Norfolk, Virginia, on 23 August to carry out actual Deck Landing Training (DLT) on the United States Navy's escort carrier the USS Charger, which was operating in Chesapeake Bay.

On completion of working up the squadron returned to RN Air Section Norfolk, on 15 October, and then on 18 it embarked in the Ruler-class escort carrier, HMS Ranee, for passage to the United Kingdom. The carrier sailed for New York City on 22 October and then joined with the Liverpool bound Convoy CU.44 for the Atlantic crossing, but broke off for Belfast, Northern Ireland, with the squadron disembarking to Royal Naval Air Maintenance Yard Belfast (HMS Gadwall).

1846 Naval Air Squadron flew to RNAS Eglinton (HMS Gannet), Derry, on 2 November where it increased its strength to twenty-four aircraft from the disbandment 1848 Naval Air Squadron. Training and work up continued and the squadron flew to Scotland on 11 December, to RNAS Ayr (HMS Wagtail), Ayr, for a week of training, returning to RNAS Eglinton on 18. It moved again in the New Year although remaining in Northern Ireland, flying to RNAS Ballyhalbert (HMS Corncrake), County Down on 13 January. A detachment of twelve aircraft carried out DLT in the name ship of her class of aircraft carrier, HMS Colossus, between 22 and 27 January. The following month the squadron swapped its Vought Corsair Mk III aircraft for Mk IV, this later mark being the Goodyear built FG-1D variant.

The squadron flew out to fully embark in HMS Colossus later in February and the aircraft carrier sailed for the Far East, calling at Alexandria, Egypt, where on 22 of the month the squadron disembarked to RNAS Dekheila (HMS Grebe). The squadron re-embarked in HMS Colossus on 4 May and on reaching Southern India it disembarked to Royal Naval Aircraft Maintenance Yard Tambaram (HMS Valluru), Madras, on 10 June, where along with 827 Naval Air Squadron it formed the 14th Carrier Air Group (14th CAG) on 30 May, for service in HMS Colossus.

1846 Naval air Squadron re-embarked on 5 July when the aircraft carrier sailed for Australia arriving around three weeks later. It disembarked from HMS Colossus on 21 July to RNAS Nowra (HMS Nabbington), New South Wales. It remained ashore until 13 August, re-embarking in HMS Colossus when she prepared to sail. HMS Colossus arrived at Hong Kong on 12 October and 1846 disembarked a detachment of aircraft to operate from RNAS Kai Tak (HMS Nabcatcher), re-embarking them on the 18, when the aircraft carrier sailed to Ceylon.

HMS Colossus arrived at Ceylon on 26 October and disembarked the 14th Carrier Air Group to RNAS Katukurunda (HMS Ukussa). 1846 Naval Air Squadron remained in Ceylon for a couple of months until 30 December, before it re-embarked and the carrier sailed for South Africa. On arrival her squadrons were disembarked to RNAS Wingfield (HMS Malagas), Cape Town, on 17 January 1946.

The squadrons re-embarked on 8 April and the carrier prepared to return to Ceylon. It departed on 13 April and arrived or Ceylon on the 27. The 14th CAG disembarked to RNAS Katukurunda (HMS Ukussa) and remained for around one month before re-embarked in HMS Colossus on 17 May for passage home. On arrival to the UK her squadrons flew ashore, 1846 Naval Air Squadron to RNAS Gosport (HMS Siskin), Hampshire, on 23 July, where it disbanded.

== Aircraft flown ==
1846 Naval Air Squadron flew two variants of only one aircraft type:

- Vought Corsair Mk III fighter bomber (July - February 1945)
- Vought Corsair Mk IV fighter bomber (February 1945 - July 1946)

== Assignments ==
1846 Naval Air Squadron was assigned as needed to form part of a number of larger units:

- 14th Carrier Air Group (30 June 1945 - 23 July 1946)

== Naval air stations ==
1846 Naval Air Squadron operated from a number of naval air stations of the Royal Navy, in the United Kingdom, and overseas, a Royal Navy escort carrier and a fleet carrier:

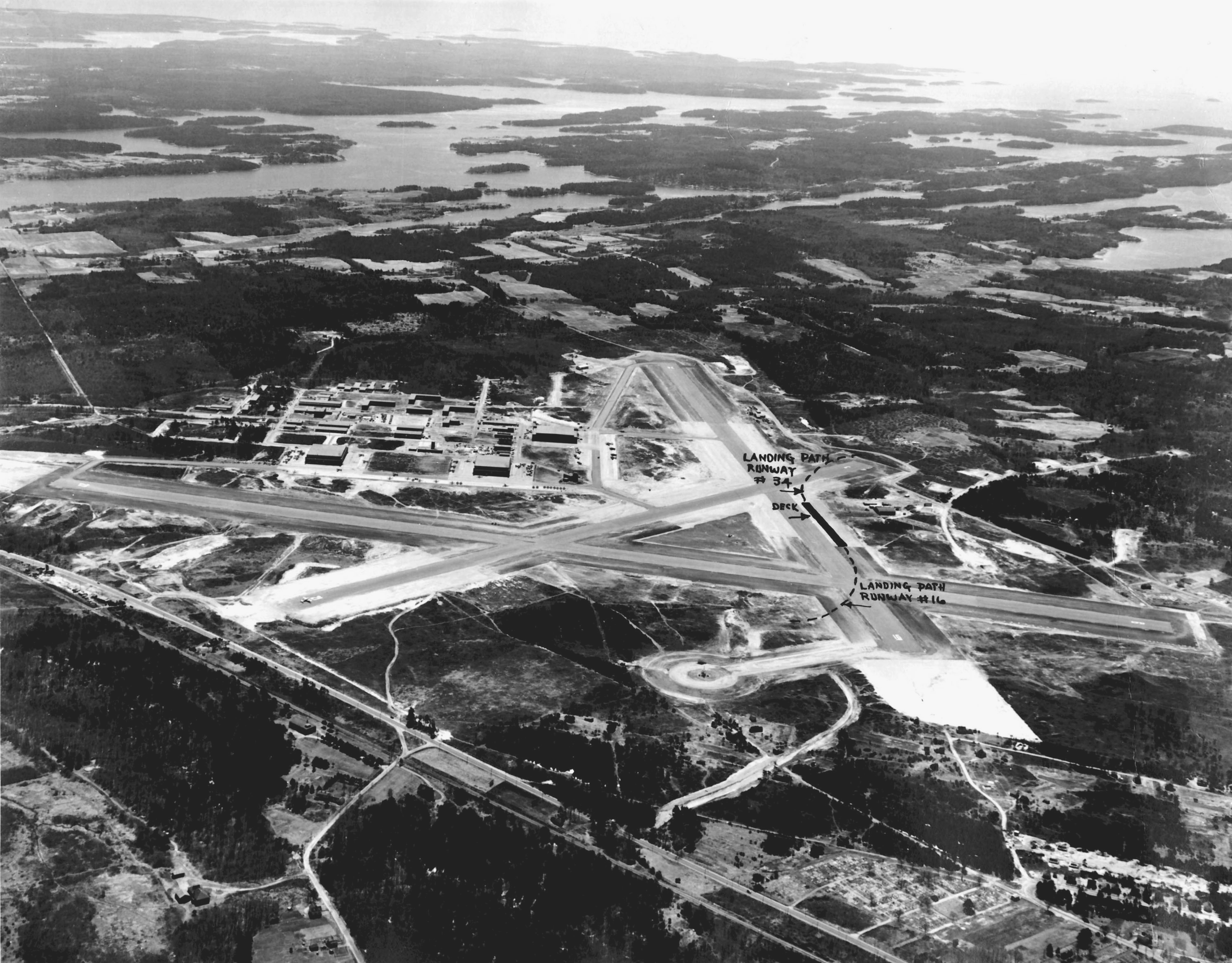
Aerial view of Naval Air Station Brunswick in 1944

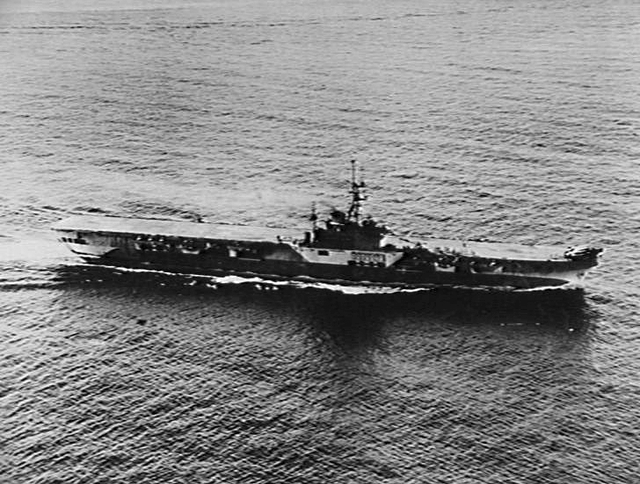
HMS Colossus in 1945

- RN Air Section Brunswick, Maine, (1 July - 15 October 1944)
  - RN Air Section Norfolk, Virginia, (Detachment Deck Landing Training (DLT) USS Charger 23 - 25 August 1944)
- RN Air Section Norfolk, Virginia, (15 - 18 October 1944)
- HMS Ranee (18 October - 2 November 1944)
- Royal Naval Air Station Eglinton (HMS Gannet), County Londonderry, (2 November - 11 December 1944)
- Royal Naval Air Station Ауr (HMS Wagtail), South Ayrshire, (11 - 18 December 1944)
- Royal Naval Air Station Eglinton (HMS Gannet), County Londonderry, (18 December 1944 - 13 January 1945)
- Royal Naval Air Station Ballyhalbert (HMS Corncrake), County Down, (13 January - 20 February 1945)
  - HMS Colossus (Detachment twelve aircraft 22 - 27 January 1945)
- HMS Colossus (20 February - 22 March 1945)
- Royal Naval Air Station Dekhaila (HMS Grebe), Alexandria, Egypt, (22 March - 4 May 1945)
- HMS Colossus (4 May - 10 June 1945)
- Royal Naval Air Station Tambaram (HMS Valluru), India, (10 June - 5 July 1945)
- HMS Colossus (5 - 21 July 1945
- Royal Naval Air Station Nowra (HMS Nabbington), New South Wales, (21 July - 13 August 1945)
- HMS Colossus (13 August - 26 October 1945)
  - Royal Naval Air Station Kai Tak (HMS Nabcatcher), Hong Kong, (Detachment 12 - 18 October 1945)
- Royal Naval Air Station Katukurunda (HMS Ukussa), Ceylon, (26 October - 30 December 1945)
- HMS Colossus (30 December 1945 - 17 January 1946)
- Royal Naval Air Station Wingfield (HMS Malagas), Cape Town, South Africa, (17 January - 8 April 1946)
- HMS Colossus (8 - 27 April 1946
- Royal Naval Air Station Katukurunda (HMS Ukussa), Ceylon, (27 April - 17 May 1946)
- HMS Colossus (17 May - 23 July 1946)
- Royal Naval Air Station Gosport (HMS Siskin), Hampshire, disbanded - (23 July 1946)

== Commanding officers ==
List of commanding officers of 1846 Naval Air Squadron with date of appointment:

- Lieutenant Commander(A) D.G. Brooker, RNVR, from 1 July 1944 (KIFA 20 March 1945)
- Lieutenant Commander(A) S.L. Devonald, DFC, RN, from 4 April 1945
- Lieutenant Commander(A) D.A. Dick, DSC, RNVR, from 26 February 1946
- disbanded - 23 July 1946

Note: Abbreviation (A) signifies Air Branch of the RN or RNVR.
