= SS Michael =

SS Michael may refer to:

- USS Uranus (AF-14), of the Uranus-class stores ships, which served in the U.S. Navy during World War II
- SS King Gruffydd (1898), a steamer bought in 1906 by the Bank of Athens and renamed Michael
