= HMS Theseus (R64) =

1946 Colossus-class aircraft carrier of the Royal Navy

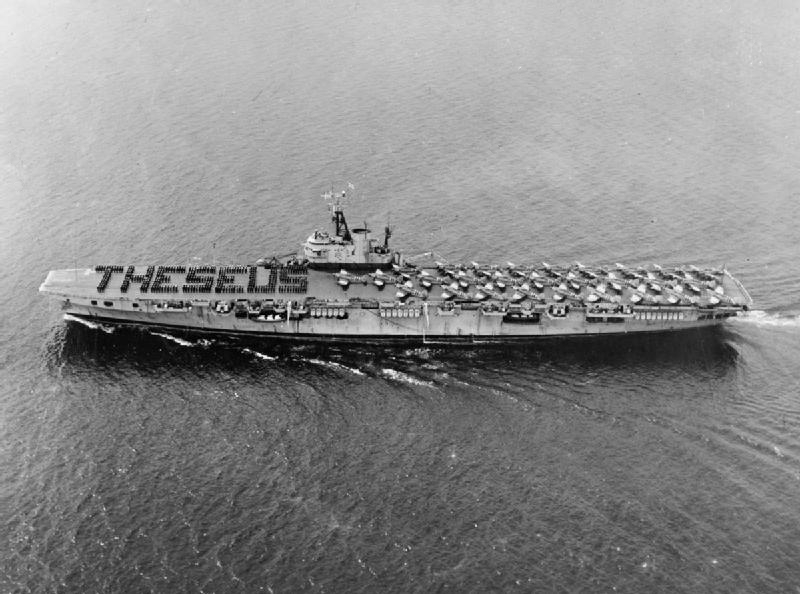
- HMS Theseus (R64) off Japan 1951

History

United Kingdom
- Name: Theseus
- Builder: Fairfield
- Laid down: 6 January 1943
- Launched: 6 July 1944
- Commissioned: 9 January 1946
- Stricken: 1960
- Fate: Scrapping commenced on 29 May 1962 at Inverkeithing, Scotland

General characteristics
- Class & type: Colossus-class aircraft carrier
- Displacement: 13,400 tons
- Length: 695 ft (212 m)
- Beam: 80 ft (24 m)
- Draught: 23.5 ft (7.2 m)
- Propulsion: 4 × steam turbines; Admiralty 3-drum boilers, Parsons geared turbines
- Speed: 25 knots (46 km/h)
- Range: 12,000 nautical miles (22,000 km) at 14 knots (26 km/h)
- Complement: 1,300
- Armament: 30 × Bofors 40 mm guns
- Aircraft carried: 48

HMS Theseus /ˈtʰeː.seu̯s/, [ˈt̪ʰeːs̠ɛu̯s̠] (R64) was a Colossus-class light fleet aircraft carrier of the Royal Navy. Theseus was laid down on 6 January 1943 by Fairfield at Govan and was launched on 6 July 1944. She was involved in the Korean War and the Suez Crisis. The scrapping of the Theseus was commenced on 29 May 1962 at Inverkeithing, Scotland.

The ship's name, Theseus, is derived from a hero in Greek mythology, specifically the legendary king and founder of Athens, who bears the same name.

== Service history ==
=== Work-up and initial service ===
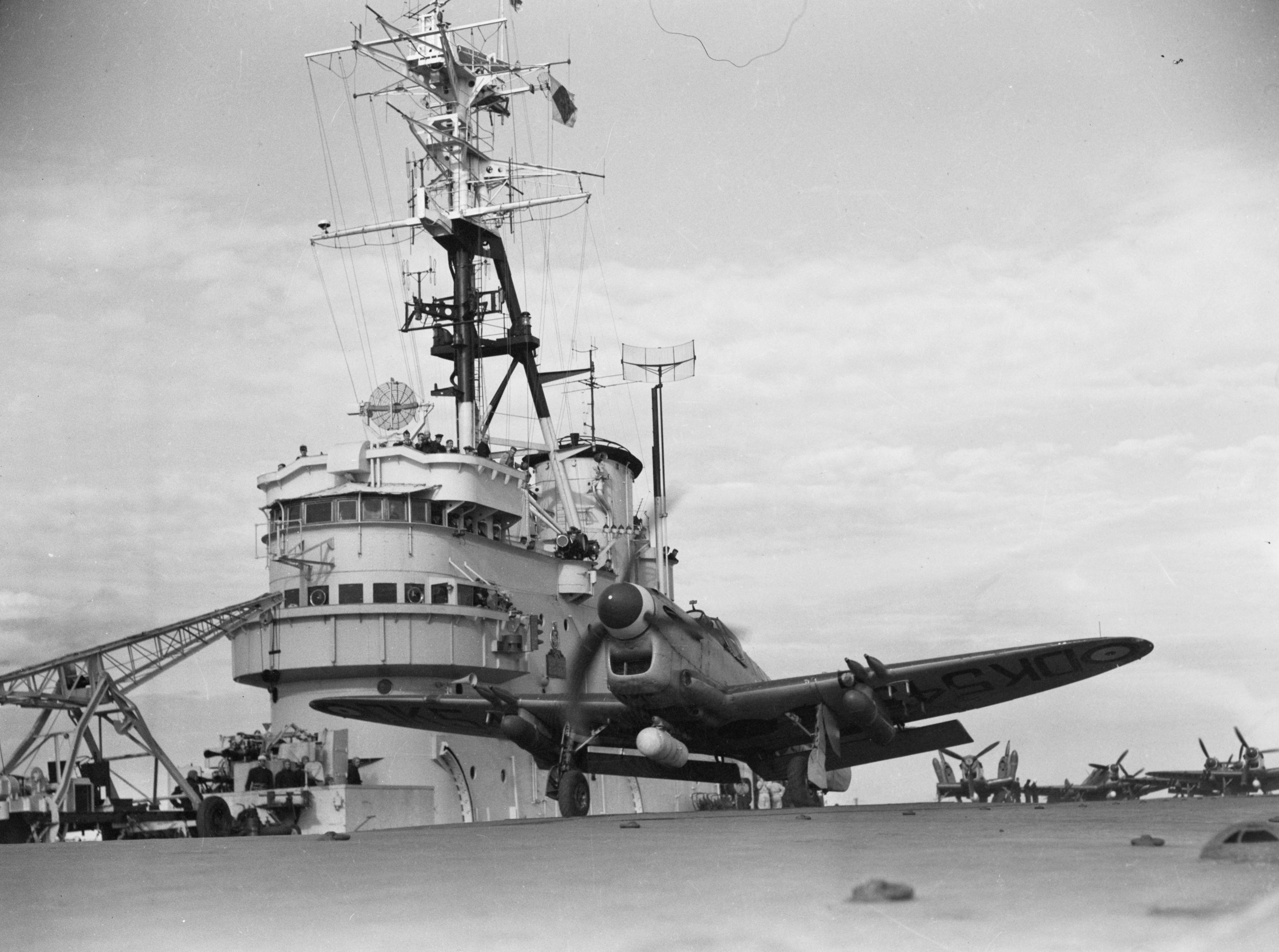
Aircraft carrier HMS Theseus in Australian waters, 1947

Theseus was laid down to serve in the Second World War, but was not completed until 9 February 1946, after peace was declared in 1945. Theseus was then utilized as a training vessel until the outbreak of the Korean War.

In 1946, Theseus embarked on work-up and embarked aircraft, conducted trials, and a further work-up for operational service. After preparation for duty in the Far East, she sailed to join the British Pacific Fleet at Singapore as Flagship for the Flag Officer Air, Far East. In 1947, she deployed as the Flagship of the 1st Aircraft Carrier Squadron of the British Pacific Fleet. Upon her return to the United Kingdom she was refitted for service in the Home Fleet. She then joined the 3rd Aircraft Carrier Squadron, Home Fleet.

=== Korean War ===
In 1950, with the beginning of the Korean War, Theseus was deployed to Korea to commence standard carrier operations. Her first operation involved suppressing enemy defences and communications at Chinnampo, among other locations. Her second operational patrol involved only Combat Air Patrols (CAP) because her take-off weight capacity was limited by a dysfunctional catapult, and thus aircraft were unable to be armed with rockets and bombs. Her third operational duty was as part of the Commonwealth Task Force. Theseus sailed with accompanying ships from Sasebo in Japan. The carrier's aircraft launched successful air strikes on bridges, North Korean troops, and other opportune targets. Her operations in the Korean War primarily concentrated on the Chinnampo area, resulting in widespread damage to the area.

During her fourth operational patrol, which began in December of 1950, aircraft from Theseus sighted and fired on numerous land vehicles in the north of the separated country. Many of the targeted vehicles were destroyed. Soon afterwards, Chinese troops became the target of attacks from the carrier's aircraft, which had completed over 1,630 hours in the air and had fired over 1,400 rockets by the completion of their fourth tour.

On 5 January 1951, Theseus began her fifth operational patrol supporting the American 25th Division, who were fighting south of Osan in South Korea. On 15 January Theseus achieved the milestone of 1,000 accident-free landings. The Carrier Air Group (CAG) were awarded the Boyd Trophy for a remarkable operational tour of duty that included many firsts for pilots and aircrew.

Theseus' sixth operational patrol in late January of 1951, included several major and minor accidents. On 26 January, an aircraft appeared to shudder before spinning out of control and into the sea. The C-class destroyer Cossack went to the location of the crash but to no avail. A second aircraft was hit a number of times by anti-aircraft gunfire, forcing the pilot to ditch the aircraft in a valley in an area near Tongduchon-ni. The pilot waited for rescue for about ninety minutes. An American helicopter flew in and picked up the pilot, while other aircraft from Theseus flew a close-air patrol over the area. On 2 February, a Sea Fury burst a tyre while landing, straining the fuselage and bringing the number of accident-free landings to an end at 1,463.

The seventh operational patrol started off poorly when a squadron of Fairey Fireflies returning from a reconnaissance mission experienced weapon misfires, causing one fatality. Further similar missions were flown, as well as close air support for the U.S. IX Corps in the Wonju area.

The eighth operational patrol, beginning on 4 March 1951, saw much of the same, with patrols over the now-familiar area of Chinnampo to Kuhsa-Sung to create the illusion of an imminent amphibious assault. Two more crashes occurred, the first incurring no casualties, but the second proving fatal when an aircraft crashed while returning to Theseus.

The ninth operational patrol opened with the shooting down of another aircraft at Suwon on 24 March. Further reconnaissance and CAS missions were flown, including an attack on six enemy vessels.

The tenth operational patrol began on 8 April 1951, operating in the Sea of Japan accompanied by the American carrier USS Bataan, together with an allied destroyer screen, comprising HMS Consort, HMAS Bataan, HMCS Huron, USS English and USS Sperry. On 10 April two Sea Furies were attacked by American Corsairs in a friendly-fire incident. One Sea Fury was seriously damaged, though the other escaped unscathed after much maneuvering. Two other Sea Furies performing reconnaissance duties nearby heard the call for assistance. However, while on the way there, one was shot down and the pilot was taken prisoner. Another aircraft searching for the first was shot down by flak, but the pilot escaped capture.

Two separate aircraft were shot down shortly afterward. The first landed only forty miles from Theseus, damaged by flak, and was soon rescued by helicopter. The second, also hit by flak, crashed into a paddy field and skidded into a dry river bed where it came under small arms fire from North Korean troops. The remaining aircraft from the flight acted as a RESCAP (Rescue Close Air Patrol) while a further two Sea Furies escorted a helicopter en route to the downed pilot's location. After thirty-eight minutes, the severely injured pilot was rescued.

Further successful strikes were launched on numerous North Korean targets. During these strikes, another aircraft from the carrier's flight complement was shot down. The downed pilot was rescued by an American helicopter pilot who was later awarded the Distinguished Service Cross for successfully carrying out a courageous rescue despite heavy small-arms fire from North Korean troops. He was awarded the honor at the British Consulate in Seattle.

On 15 January 1952 allied task force operations ended with the departure of the American carrier Bataan. Theseus continued operations in Korea, this time on the west coast. An aircraft from Theseus was ditched due to engine failure, the pilot spending 55 minutes in a rough sea before being rescued. Operations from Theseus ended two days later. Theseus was replaced by her sister ship Glory and departed Korea for Sasebo.

Naval-history.net records state that in late 1951, Theseus joined the Home Fleet as Flagship, 2nd Aircraft Carrier Squadron. In 1952, she became Home Fleet Flagship, and was then detached to the Mediterranean to relieve Glory for service with the United Nations' effort off Korea. She took part in joint exercises in the Mediterranean with other Home Fleet ships. From February to March of 1952, Theseus, with the 14th Carrier Air Group embarked, took part in the NATO Exercise Grand Slam in the Mediterranean.

In 1953 she took part in the Fleet Review, celebrating the Coronation of Queen Elizabeth II.

=== Suez Crisis and fate ===
In 1956, Theseus was used as an emergency commando carrier, along with Ocean, during the Suez Crisis. From November to December, helicopters from Theseus transported troops ashore and evacuated wounded soldiers. Compared to her actions during the Korean War, her role at Suez was relatively minor. The following year she was placed in reserve. In 1962, she was broken up in Inverkeithing, Scotland.

== Publications ==
- Colledge, J. J.; Warlow, Ben (2006) [1969]. Ships of the Royal Navy: The Complete Record of All Fighting Ships of the Royal Navy from the 15th Century to the Present (3rd Rev ed.). London: Chatham Publishing. ISBN 978-1-86176-281-8. OCLC 67375475.
