= French aircraft carrier Arromanches =

1944 Colossus-class aircraft carrier of the Royal and French navies

Arromanches
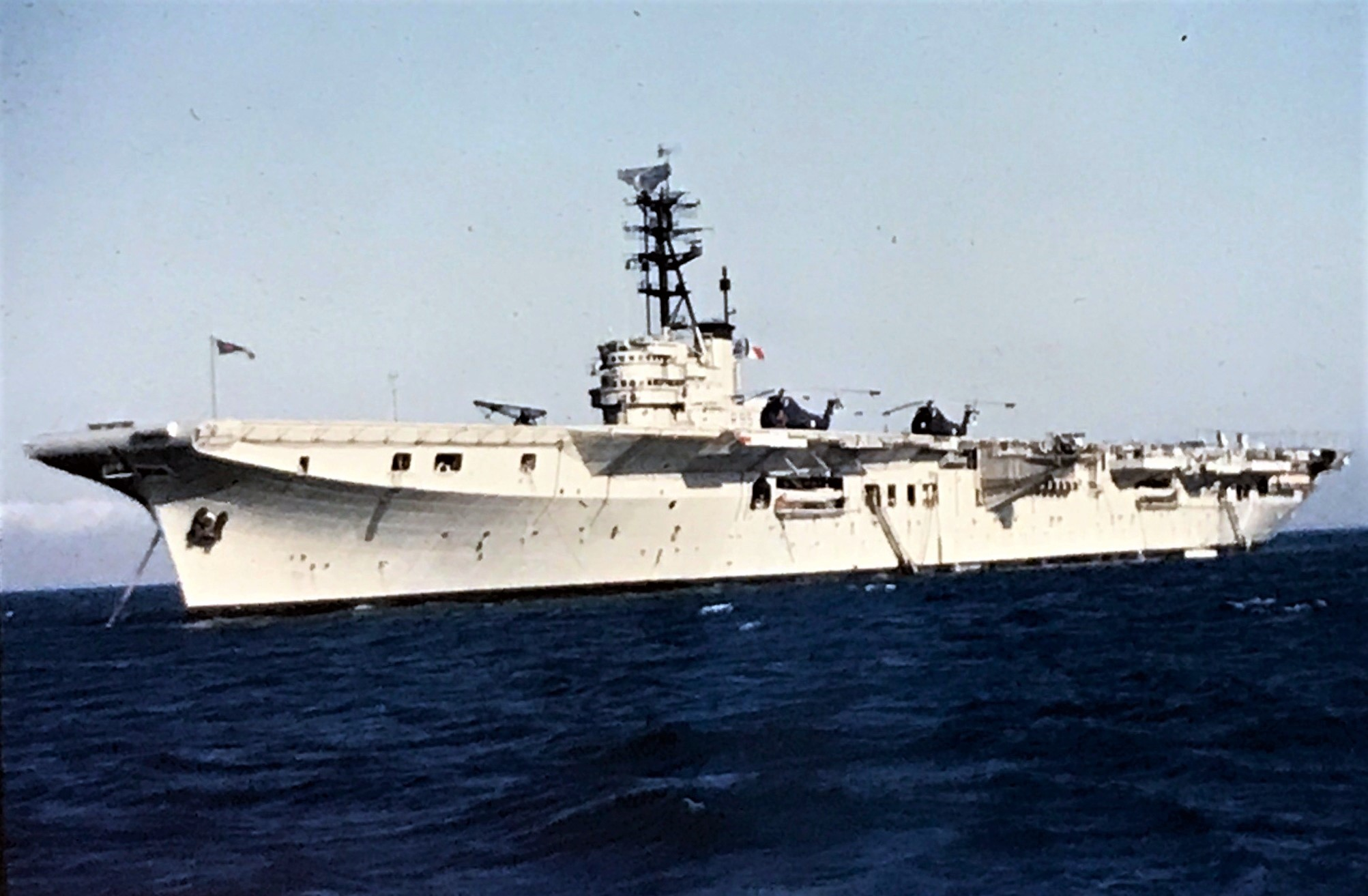
- Arromanches in the Mediterranean, 1961

History

United Kingdom
- Name: Colossus
- Namesake: Colossus
- Builder: Vickers-Armstrongs, High Walker
- Launched: 30 September 1943
- Commissioned: 16 December 1944
- Motto: On The Ball
- Fate: Loaned to French Navy in 1946

France
- Name: Arromanches
- Namesake: Arromanches-les-Bains
- Acquired: 1946
- Decommissioned: 1974
- Identification: Pennant number: R95; International signal: FBED; Air control callsign: "Sapho"
- Fate: Scrapped in Toulon, France 1978

General characteristics
- Class & type: Colossus-class aircraft carrier
- Displacement: 13,600 tonnes
- Length: 212 m (695 ft 6 in)
- Beam: 24.4 m (80 ft 1 in)
- Draught: 7.2 m (23 ft 7 in)
- Propulsion: Steam Turbines (4 Admiralty 3-drum boilers, Parsons geared turbines)
- Speed: 25 kn (46 km/h)
- Range: 12,000 nmi (22,000 km)
- Complement: 1,300
- Aircraft carried: 48
- Notes: Only under flag of the French Navy, her Air control callsign was "Sapho"

Arromanches (French pronunciation: [aʁɔmɑ̃ʃ]; R95) was an aircraft carrier of the French Navy, which served from 1946 to 1974. She was previously HMS Colossus (15) of the Royal Navy. She was the name-ship of the Colossus class of light carriers. She was commissioned in 1944, but did not see any action in World War II. She served with the British Pacific Fleet in 1945–46, as an aircraft transport and repatriation ship.

In 1946, she was loaned to the French Navy, and renamed Arromanches; she was bought by the French in 1951.

Arromanches participated in the First Indochina War in four campaigns from 1948 to 1954, and the Suez Crisis of 1956. In 1968 she was converted to an anti-submarine warfare (ASW) carrier. She was decommissioned in 1974, and broken up in 1978.

== Design and construction ==
The Colossus class was designed to meet the Royal Navy's wartime need for more carriers as cheaply as possible. They were built to mercantile standards, with no armour, no heavy AA guns, and only 25 kn (46 km/h) speed. Colossus was ordered on 14 March 1942 under Admiralty Job Number J 4576, one of three Colossus-class carriers ordered that day. The ship was laid down at Vickers-Armstrongs' High Walker shipyard on 1 June 1942 with the Yard number 55 and was launched on 30 September 1943. Colossus was formally commissioned on 1 December 1944, being completed and handed over to the Royal Navy on 16 December 1944.

== Weapons and systems ==
=== Radars ===
In 1947 she had for air scanning only, one 79B, for air and surface scanning, one 277 and one 281B. With those she also had a target indicator, a 293. Then in 1954 she still had in her possession a 281B for air and surface scanning a 291B and a 277. Arromanches also still had a 293 as her target indicator. Still for air scanning only she had the 79B, but she also gained later that year a YE and for navigation a DRBN-30. In 1959 she was down-graded and only had a YE in her possession left. That year she gained new scanning equipment. She had a DRBV-22 for air scanning and for surface scanning and navigation a new DRBV-31. And finally in 1972 she was fully downgraded and had her YE removed, but kept her DRBV-22 and DRBV-31 for air, surface, and navigation.

=== Armament ===
==== Weaponry ====
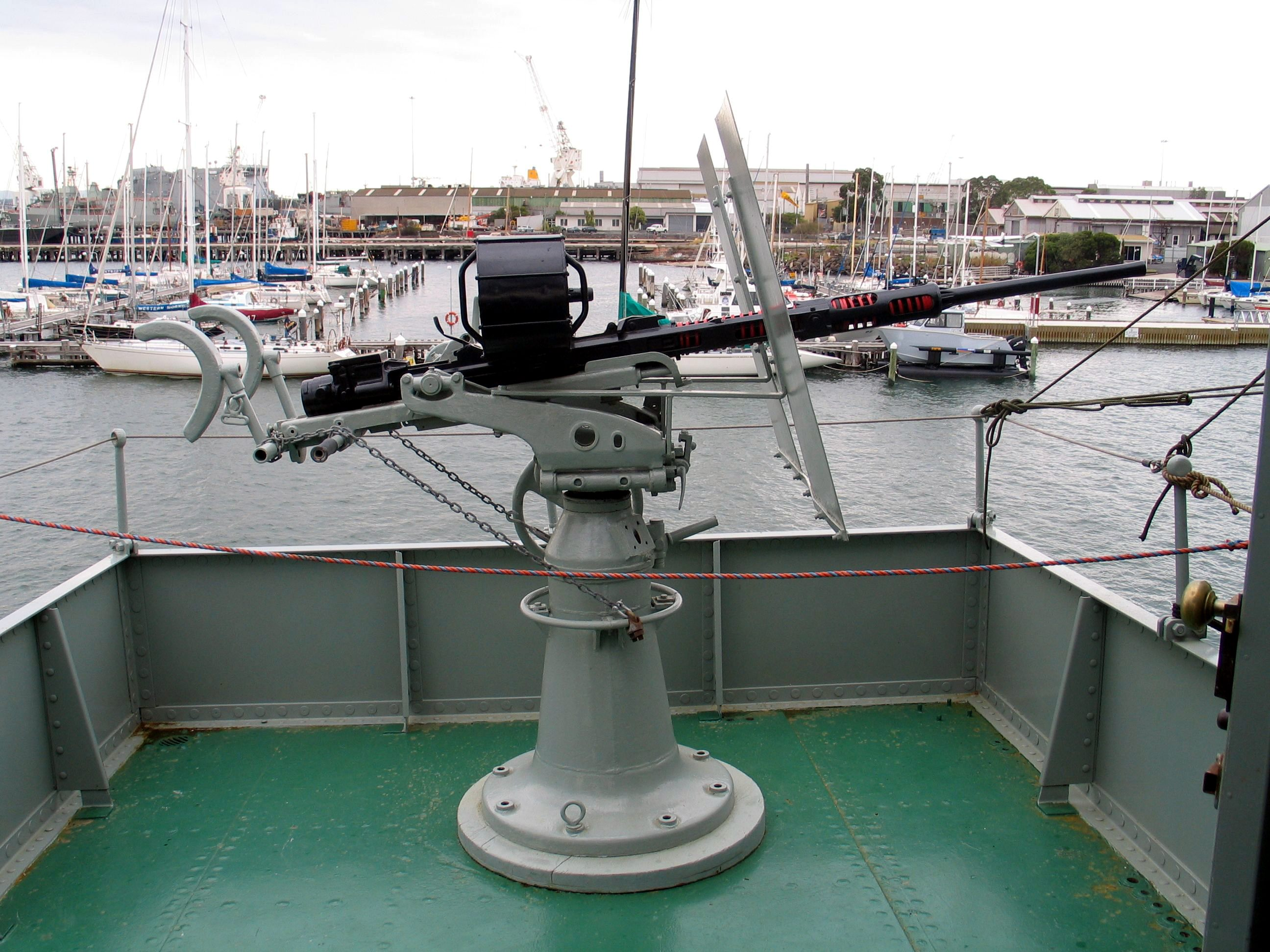
An Oerlikon 20 mm cannon

During her time in military service she had twenty-four Vickers-Armstrongs 2-pounder guns, thirty-two Oerlikon 20 mm cannon, later replaced in 1945 by twenty-one Bofors 40 mm guns and four Ordnance QF 3-pounder Vickers guns.

==== Aircraft ====
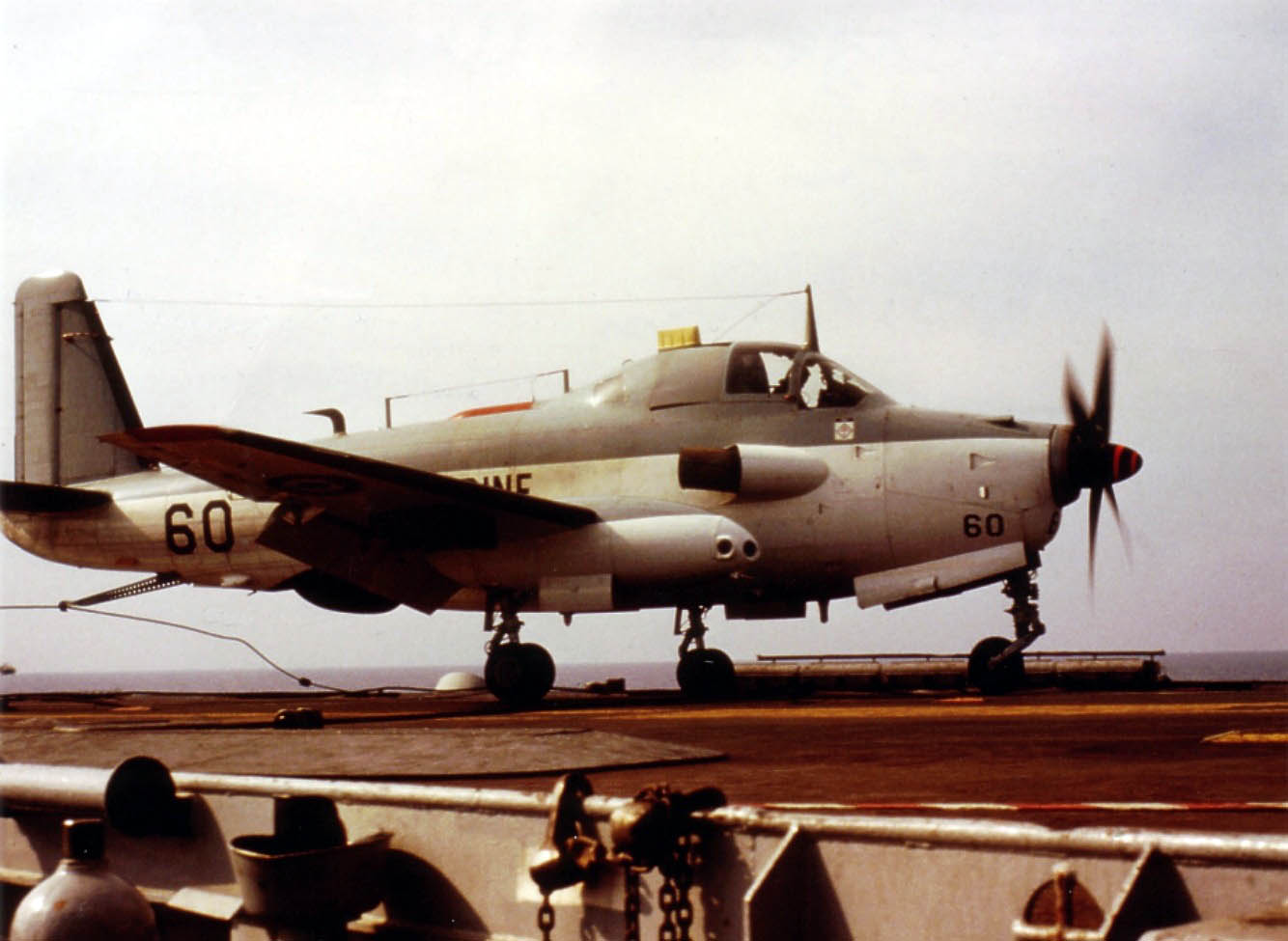
The Breguet Alizé

During her service with France before 1968 she carried the Breguet Br-1050 Alizé, the Vought F4U-7 Corsair, the Grumman F6F-5 Hellcat, the Fouga CM-175 Zéphyr, the Curtiss SB2C-5 Helldiver, the Douglas SBD-5 Dauntless, the SNCASE Aquilon, the Supermarine Seafire Mk III and XV, and the Grumman TBM Avenger. After 1968, she was converted to a helicopter carrier and carried the Alouette II and Alouette III, the Sikorsky S-51, Sikorsky S-55, and Sikorsky S-58, the Piasecki H-21 and Piasecki H-25, and the Morane-Saulnier MS-500 Criquet.

=== Aeronautical installations ===
The carrier had a regular flight deck 211 m × 24.5 m (692 ft 3 in × 80 ft 5 in), catapult at the bow of the ship, two lifts (13.72 m x 10.36 m wide), and a hangar (104.24 × 15.85 m wide) fitted (in 1964) to accommodate 13 TBMs, 2 HUP-2s or 15 F4Us and 2 HUP-2.

=== Manning ===
As Colossus, she carried 854 crew, plus 222 Fleet Air Arm personnel in the air group.

In French service, she carried 42 officers, 145 petty officers, and 516 sailors in peacetime. Her war complement was 60 officers, 171 petty officers, and 613 sailors.

== Operational history ==
=== Royal Navy ===
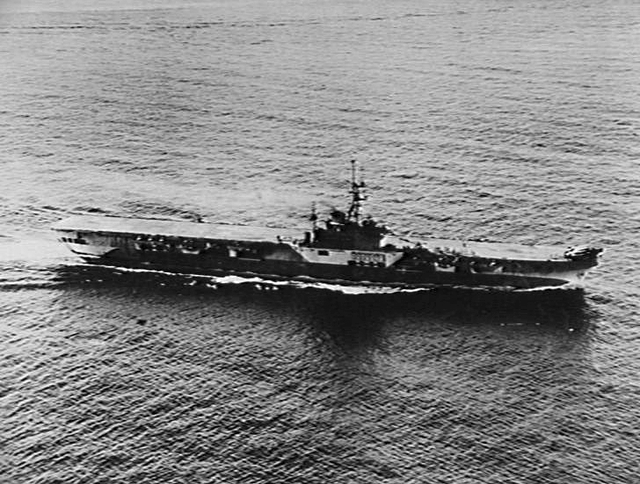
HMS Colossus off Shanghai, 1945.

After working up Colossus left Glasgow on 12 March 1945 for the Far East. She carried 24 Vought Corsair IV fighters from 1846 Naval Air Squadron, and 18 Fairey Barracuda II torpedo bombers from 827 NAS. She arrived at Colombo, Ceylon, on 13 June 1945, sailing on to Sydney, Australia, where she arrived the following month. Here, her 20 mm Oerlikon guns were replaced by 40 mm Bofors guns. In August she became the flagship of Rear Admiral Cecil Harcourt, commanding the 11th Aircraft Carrier Squadron (Colossus, Venerable, Vengeance, and Glory). This force was sent to re-occupy Hong Kong. Colossus also headed a task force to occupy Shanghai, together with the cruisers Bermuda and Argonaut and five destroyers. In December 1945, Colossus transported released Dutch prisoners of war to Colombo. From 17 January to 26 March 1946, Colossus was refitted and repaired at Cape Town in the Selborne drydock at Simonstown.

=== French Navy ===
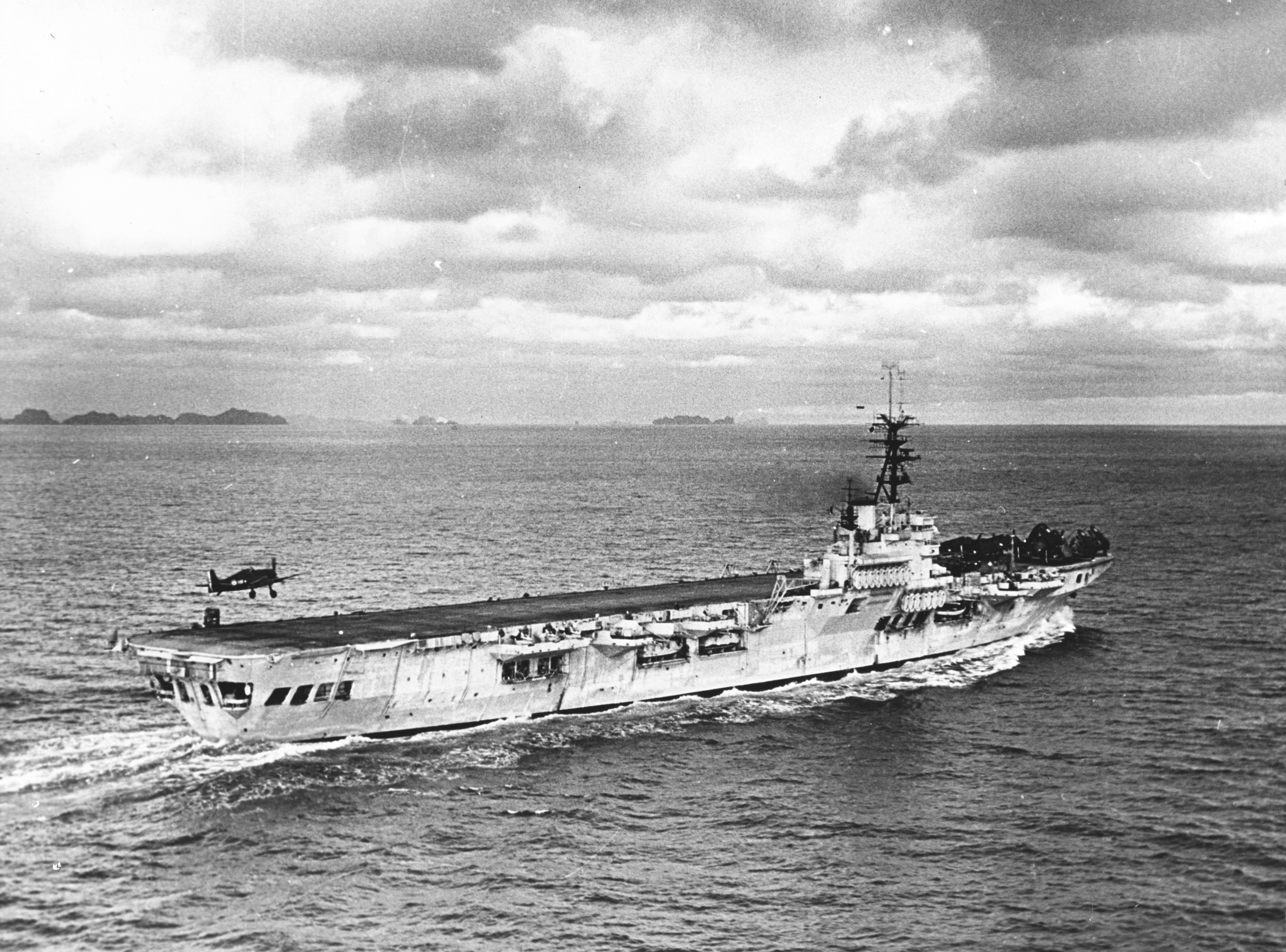
An F6F-5 landing on Arromanches in the Tonkin Gulf, 1953.

In August 1946 Colossus was loaned to France and renamed Arromanches, after the French commune of the same name, which was the site of the British D-Day landings. In 1948, Arromanches participated in the First Indochina War for three months. She returned to France in 1949. In 1951, France purchased the ship. She was again deployed to Indochina in 1951–52, in 1952-53 and 1953–54.

In 1956, Arromanches was deployed to the eastern Mediterranean Sea during the Suez Crisis. On 3 November, 18 F4U Corsairs from Arromanches and La Fayette bombed Egyptian airfields around Cairo.

In 1957–58 Arromanches was reconstructed with a four-degree angled flight deck, a mirror landing sight and with other modifications for anti-submarine warfare, including operation of Breguet Alizé ASW aircraft. She was also equipped for training operations. In 1959 she returned once again to the Indian Ocean.

In May 1967, she rescued the sole survivor from the Liberian tanker Circe, which had exploded in the Mediterranean Sea off the south coast of France with the loss of 38 lives. In 1968 Arromanches was converted to a helicopter carrier for the French Marines, with up to 24 helicopters on board. This ended her role as a training carrier.

Arromanches was decommissioned on 22 January 1974, and in 1978 broken up at Toulon, a place of importance for both the first Colossus in 1793, and the last in 1978.

== See also ==
- List of aircraft carriers

== Bibliography ==
- Hobbs, David (2014). British Aircraft Carriers: Design, Development and Service Histories. Barnsley, UK: Seaforth Publishing. ISBN 978-1-84832-138-0.
- Moulin, Jean (1998). Les porte-avions Dixmude et Arromanches. Nantes: Marines édition. ISBN 2-909-675-39-4.
- Wright, Christopher (September 2018). "Answer 20/55". Warship International. LV (3): 199. ISSN 0043-0374.
