= HMS Ocean (R68) =

1945 Colossus-class aircraft carrier of the Royal Navy

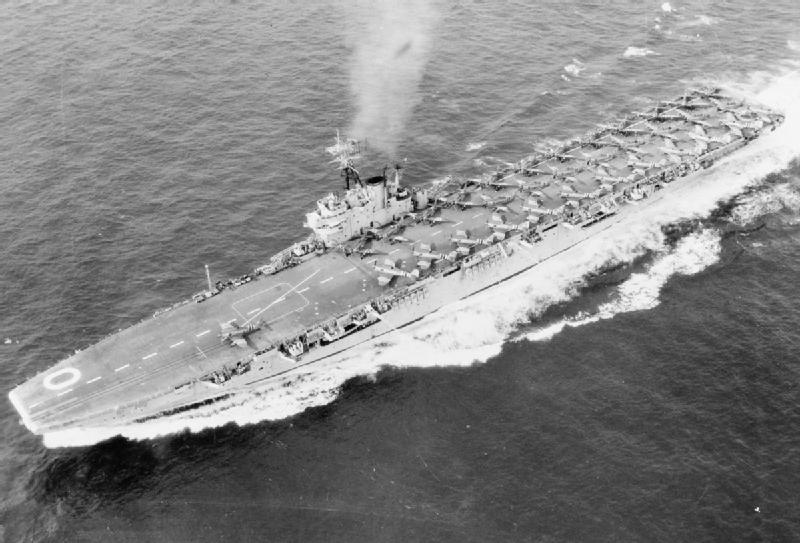
- HMS Ocean off Korea in July 1952

History

United Kingdom
- Name: Ocean
- Builder: Alexander Stephen & Sons
- Laid down: 8 November 1942
- Launched: 8 July 1944
- Commissioned: 8 August 1945
- Decommissioned: 1960
- Out of service: In reserve, 1957
- Fate: Scrapped Faslane, Scotland 1962

General characteristics
- Class & type: Colossus-class aircraft carrier
- Displacement: 13,190 tons
- Length: 630 ft (190 m)
- Beam: 80 ft (24 m)
- Draught: 18 ft 6 in (5.64 m)
- Propulsion: Parson geared turbines, 4 × Admiralty 3-drum boilers; 2 shafts; 40,000 shp (30,000 kW)
- Speed: 25 knots (46 km/h; 29 mph)
- Range: 12,000 nmi (22,000 km; 14,000 mi)] at 14 knots (22,200 km at 26 km/h)
- Complement: 1,300 officers and men
- Armament: 31 (6x4)+(7x1) 2-pounder; 12 × 1 Bofors 40 mm
- Aircraft carried: 48

HMS Ocean was a Royal Navy Colossus-class light fleet aircraft carrier of 13,190 tons built in Glasgow by Alexander Stephen & Sons. Her keel was laid in November 1942, and she was commissioned on 8 August 1945.

== Construction and design ==
The Colossus class was a class of relatively small aircraft carriers which were designed to be built quickly to meet the Royal Navy's requirements for more carriers to allow it to fight a global war. In order to allow speedy build, they were designed to mercantile rather than navy hull standards, while armour protection and long-range anti aircraft guns were not fitted. Sixteen ships were ordered by the end of 1942, but the last six were completed to a modified design as the Majestic-class.

The ships were between 693 feet 2 inches (211.28 m) and 695 feet 0 inches (211.84 m) long overall, 650 feet (198.12 m) at the waterline and 630 feet (192.02 m) between perpendiculars. Beam was 80 feet (24.38 m) and draught was 23 feet 6 inches (7.16 m) at deep load. Displacement was 13,190 long tons (13,400 t) standard and 18,040 long tons (18,330 t) deep load. Four Admiralty 3-drum boilers supplied steam to two sets of Parsons geared steam turbines which in turn drove two propeller shafts. The machinery was rated at 40,000 shaft horsepower (30,000 kW), giving a speed of 25 knots (29 mph; 46 km/h). The ships had a range of 12,000 nautical miles (14,000 mi; 22,000 km) at a speed of 14 knots (16 mph; 26 km/h).

The flight deck was 690 feet (210.3 m) long and 80 feet (24.4 m) wide, while the hangar was 445 feet (135.6 m) long and 52 feet (15.8 m) wide with a clear overhead height of 17 feet 6 inches (5.33 m). While designed to carry 24 aircraft in 1942, by the time that they became operational, the ships were accommodating 37 aircraft. Ocean was fitted with a close-in anti-aircraft armament of six quadruple and seven single 2-pounder (40 mm) pom-pom autocannon and twelve single Bofors 40 mm guns. The ship had a crew of 1300 officers and ratings.

Ocean was laid down at Alexander Stephen & Sons Glasgow shipyard on 8 November 1942 and was launched on 8 July 1944. In March 1944, a request was made by the Australian government to obtain a light fleet carrier and 6inch cruisers. The Royal Navy put forward Ocean as being available for purchase however in mid 1945 the RAN decided not to pursue the purchase due to manpower shortages during the war. The ship was commissioned into the Royal Navy on 8 August 1945. In total, the ship required 20772 man-months to build.

== Service ==
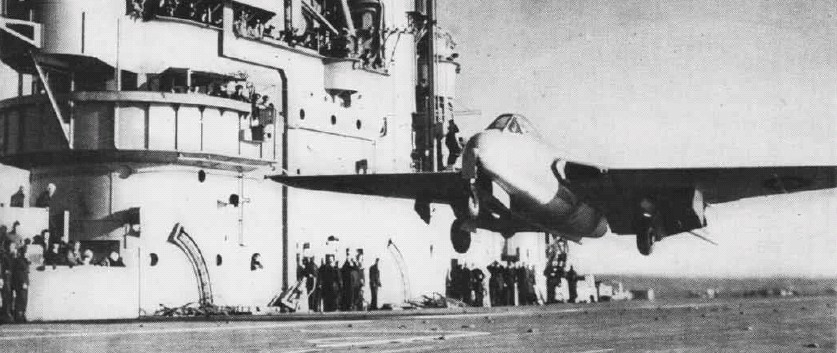
The first carrier landing and take-off of a jet aircraft in 1945

Following commissioning, Ocean was sent to Cammell Laird at Birkenhead for modification to operate night fighters - changes included revised radar (with American SM-1 radar replacing the British Type 277 height-finding radar) and improved direction-finding equipment. On completion of these changes in November 1945, Ocean was based at Rosyth for flying trials, with the first trials of the de Havilland Sea Hornet twin-engine fighter and the last carrier operations of the Fairey Swordfish biplane torpedo bomber. On 3 December 1945, a Sea Vampire flown by Eric "Winkle" Brown made the first ever carrier landing of a purely jet-powered aircraft onto Ocean (although earlier that year a composite jet and piston engined Ryan FR-1 Fireball had made a carrier landing under jet power after its radial engine failed.)

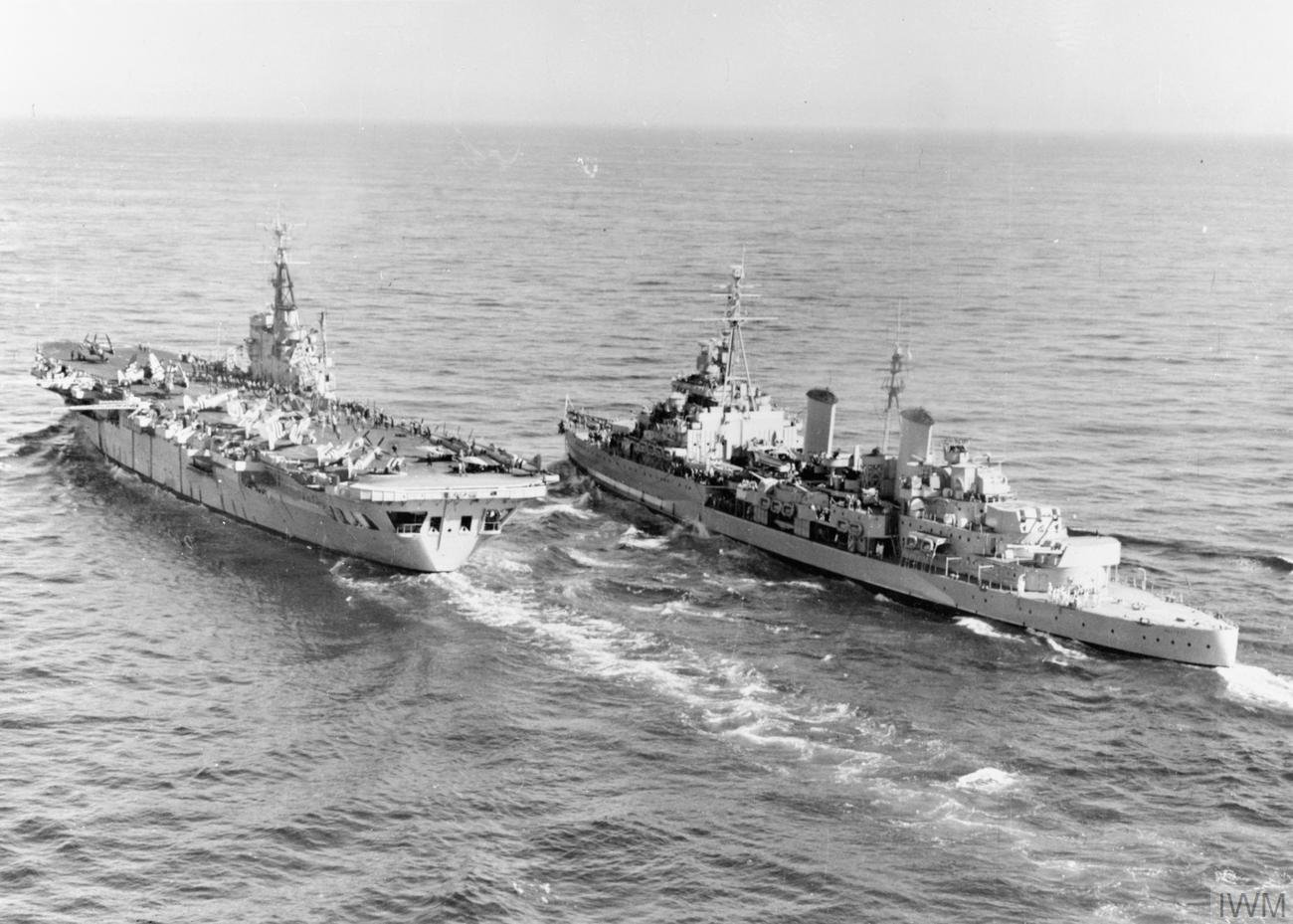
Ocean cruising off the coast of Korea alongside Belfast in 1952

In December 1945, Ocean transferred to the Mediterranean Fleet, with an air group consisting of the Supermarine Seafire-equipped 805 Naval Air Squadron and 816 Naval Air Squadron, equipped with Fairey Firefly night fighters. She disembarked her air group at Malta in June 1946 to allow her to be used as a troopship to carry troops to Singapore. In October 1946 she provided fire-fighting and medical support to the two destroyers Saumarez and Volage when they struck mines in the Corfu Channel incident. In May 1948, she formed part of the task force supporting the withdrawal of British forces from Palestine, providing air cover after RAF bases in Palestine had been evacuated.

Ocean twice deployed to Korea, firstly from May to October 1952 and then from May to November 1953. In August 1952 a formation of Hawker Sea Fury aircraft from the carrier engaged North Korean MiG-15 jets in air combat, shooting one down.

In August 1954 she joined the Home Fleet's training squadron but saw an active role in the Suez Crisis. In the first ever large-scale helicopter borne assault, Westland Whirlwind and Bristol Sycamore helicopters from Ocean and HMS Theseus landed 425 men of 45 Commando and 23 tons of stores into Port Said in 90 minutes. After Suez, the ship did not see much more active service. In October 1957, Ocean transported the Band of the Royal Marines, a party of Green Howards plus Admiral Lord Fraser of the North Cape as the Queen's representative to the funeral of King Haakon VII in Oslo. In September 1957, the Soviet Union protested when HMS Maidstone accompanied Ocean on a visit to Helsinki. She went into extended reserve in 1958 and was scrapped in 1962 at Faslane.

In his book on the Hungarian Revolution, Peter Fryer briefly refers to the "arrest of twelve British seamen in the aircraft carrier Ocean, following unlawful meetings" in October 1956.

== Sources ==
- Brown, David (1977). World War 2 Fact Files: Aircraft Carriers. London: Macdonald and Jane's. ISBN 0-354-01008-5.
- Brown, David K. (2012). Nelson to Vanguard: Warship Design and Development 1923–1945. Barnsley, UK: Seaforth Publishing. ISBN 978-1-84832-149-6.
- Chesneau, Roger (1998). Aircraft Carriers of the World, 1914 to the Present: An Illustrated Encyclopedia. London: Brockhampton. ISBN 1-86019-875-9.
- Fryer, Peter (December 1996) [1956]. Hungarian Tragedy. London: New Park. ISBN 0861510720.
- Hobbs, David (1996). Aircraft Carriers of the Royal and Commonwealth Navies. London: Greenhill Books. ISBN 1-85367-252-1.
- McCart, Neil (2002). The Colossus-Class Aircraft Carriers 1944–1972. Cheltenham: Fan Publications. ISBN 1901225062.
- Wright, Anthony (June 1998) [1978]. Australian Carrier Decisions: the acquisition of HMA Ships Albatross, Sydney and Melbourne. Papers in Australian Maritime Affairs (No. 4). Canberra: Sea Power Centre. pp. 55–109. ISBN 0-642-29503-4. ISSN 1327-5658.
